= List of Seinfeld characters =

This is a list of characters who appeared on Seinfeld. This list features only characters who appeared in main roles or multiple episodes; those that appeared in only one are not included here.

== Overview ==
Overview
= Main cast (credited)
= Recurring cast (3+ episodes)
= Guest cast (1-2 episodes)

Cast and characters in Seinfeld
Character	Portrayed by	Seasons								
Character	Portrayed by	1	2	3	4	5	6	7	8	9
Jerry Seinfeld	Himself	Main	Main	Main	Main	Main	Main	Main	Main	Main
George Louis Costanza	Jason Alexander	Main	Main	Main	Main	Main	Main	Main	Main	Main
Elaine Marie Benes	Julia Louis-Dreyfus	Main	Main	Main	Main	Main	Main	Main	Main	Main
Kessler / Cosmo Kramer	Michael Richards	Main	Main	Main	Main	Main	Main	Main	Main	Main

Cast and characters in Seinfeld
Character	Portrayed by	Seasons								
Character	Portrayed by	1	2	3	4	5	6	7	8	9
Helen Seinfeld	Liz Sheridan	Guest	Guest	Guest	Recurring	Guest	Guest	Guest	Recurring	Recurring
Morty Seinfeld	Phil Bruns	Guest								
Morty Seinfeld	Barney Martin		Guest	Guest	Recurring	Guest	Guest	Guest	Recurring	Recurring
Uncle Leo	Len Lesser		Guest	Guest	Recurring	Guest	Recurring	Guest	Guest	Guest
Newman	Wayne Knight		Voice (Note: Voiced by Larry David in the original broadcast of "The Revenge".)	Recurring	Recurring	Recurring	Recurring	Recurring	Recurring	Recurring
Susan Ross	Heidi Swedberg				Recurring			Recurring		Guest
Russell Dalrymple	Bob Balaban				Recurring					
"Crazy" Joe Davola	Peter Crombie				Recurring					
Estelle Costanza	Estelle Harris				Recurring	Recurring	Recurring	Recurring	Recurring	Recurring
Frank Costanza	Jerry Stiller				Guest (Note: Portrayed by John Randolph in the original broadcast of "The Handicap Spot".)	Recurring	Recurring	Recurring	Recurring	Recurring
George Steinbrenner	Larry David					Voice	Recurring (Note: Voiced by Larry David, portrayed by Mitch Mitchell in "The Nap" and "The Millennium", Lee Bear elsewhere.)	Recurring	Recurring	Guest
J. Peterman	John O'Hurley						Guest	Recurring	Recurring	Recurring
David Puddy	Patrick Warburton						Guest			Recurring

== Secondary characters ==
=== Characters appearing in five or more episodes ===
Character	# of episodes	Actor/Actress	Character description
Ruthie Cohen	101 (3 speaking)	Ruth Cohen	A cashier at Monk's Café whom George once accused of stealing a $20 bill with lipstick drawn on the president. From Season 4 onward, she is visible in the background as the cashier at Monk's in almost every episode that features the interior of the cafe.
Newman	48	Wayne Knight	Fellow tenant in Jerry and Kramer's apartment building. A heavyset male U.S. postal worker and Jerry's nemesis. A catchphrase of Jerry's is that he greets him with a contemptuous disdainful "Hello, Newman" each time they meet. In "The Raincoats", Helen Seinfeld addresses Newman with the same tone. In "The Revenge", only Newman's voice is heard, which was originally voiced by Larry David and rerecorded for syndication. Newman often speaks in an exaggeratedly dramatic, Shakespearean way, and generally has a more advanced vocabulary than other characters. Newman is also noted for his poetry. His first name appears to be unknown by any of the characters, even his employer; in "The Package" his business card gives his name merely as "NEWMAN". A minor character calls him "Norman" in "The Bottle Deposit", but this was a mistake on the part of the actress/character, rather than any revelation of Newman's first name. Newman is petty, vindictive, prone to hysteria, and often depicted as a stereotypical evil genius, who is usually undermined in some way. Jerry's exasperation or epiphany involving Newman will cause him to clench his fist and mutter "Newman!" under his breath. Newman and Kramer are usually depicted as casual friends, and the two sometimes participate in various unsuccessful moneymaking schemes together. Newman has been shown to harbor unrequited romantic feelings for Elaine.
Frank Costanza	29	John Randolph (first appearance), Jerry Stiller (starts in season 5)	George's father. He was born in Tuscany. Very quick to anger. He was a traveling businessman who detests removing his shoes in other people's homes and wears his sneakers in the swimming pool. He is also a former cook in the Army and learned to speak Korean while serving in the Korean War. He invents the holiday Festivus as a reaction to the cultural commercialism of Christmas.
Estelle Costanza	29	Estelle Harris	George's highly obnoxious and melodramatic mother. She constantly squabbles with Frank and George about their actions, and is the closest thing to a voice of reason in the Costanza household. Enjoys playing Mahjong. George claims she has never laughed, ever. In the episode The Puffy Shirt, Jerry attempts to tell her a joke but she quickly dismisses it.
Susan Ross	29	Heidi Swedberg	Susan was George's on-off girlfriend and later fiancée. The daughter of wealthy parents, she worked for NBC before getting fired as a result of her relationship with George. She later partnered with a woman named Mona, but then returned to her relationship with George and got engaged to him. She dies from licking cheap, toxic wedding invitation envelopes George bought. George initially shows little remorse at her demise despite her devotion to him.
Morty Seinfeld	24	Phil Bruns (first appearance), Barney Martin (later appearances)	Jerry's father. He has strong, if sometimes outdated, convictions about business and the way of the world. He spent some time as a politician in his Florida retirement community. During his working years, he sold raincoats with Harry Fleming and was the inventor of the "belt-less trench-coat". He hates Velcro because of "that tearing sound". He is extremely mindful of money, once calculating the interest and lost value of $50 that was owed several decades ago. He engages in frequent disputes with Jerry over money, refusing to let his son pay for anything in his presence, particularly restaurant checks.
Helen Seinfeld	24	Liz Sheridan	Jerry's mother. Often needed to provide reason to Jerry's and Morty's eccentric lifestyle, though overprotective of Jerry and often refuses point-blank to do anything that would inconvenience him. Sheridan is the only secondary actor to appear in all nine seasons.
Jacopo "J." Peterman	22	John O'Hurley	Elaine's boss in the last three seasons and the fictitious founder of the real-life J. Peterman Company. Eccentric adventurer and world-traveler, he lived in Costa Rica as a child. Once fired Elaine on suspicion of opium addiction when she failed a drug test after consuming a poppy seed muffin, and again for her extreme dislike of the film The English Patient. O'Hurley has said that Peterman's distinctive manner of speaking was inspired by "'40s radio drama, combined with a bit of a bad Charles Kuralt."
George Steinbrenner	13	Larry David (voice), Mitch Mitchell (in "The Nap" and "The Millennium"), Lee Bear (other appearances)	George's boss. Depicted as a rambling, unpredictable, and hard-nosed owner of the New York Yankees whose face is never seen.
Uncle Leo	15	Len Lesser	Jerry's uncle. Brother of Helen Seinfeld. Somewhat cranky. Has a son, Jeffrey, who works in the NYC Parks Department, whom he mentions at every opportunity. He is very keen on Jerry, stopping to say "hello". Often when something doesn't go the way he wants it to, he attributes it to anti-Semitism. He was once convicted of an unspecified "crime of passion".
Matt Wilhelm	12	Richard Herd	George's supervisor at the New York Yankees. Briefly abducted by a carpet-cleaning cult (by the name of S-men), Wilhelm later leaves the Yankees to become a head scout for the New York Mets. He appears to suffer from symptoms of Alzheimer's disease.
David Puddy	10	Patrick Warburton	Elaine's on-again-off-again boyfriend, often referred to and addressed as Puddy. Unflappable and calm, yet can be a surprisingly passionate individual at times (usually as a result of something Elaine has said). Appears to be an airhead and frequently stares into space. Puddy loves eating at Arby's. He perpetually squints. Used to be an auto mechanic (considered by Jerry as the only honest mechanic in New York), but later became a car salesman. A recovering mysophobe, born again Christian, and a face-painting New Jersey Devils fan. His trademark line, delivered in a monotone, is "Yeah, that's right."
Mr. Lippman	11	Richard Fancy, Harris Shore (in "The Library")	Elaine's boss at Pendant Publishing and a temporary boss of George in "The Red Dot". Later, he opens a bakery named "Top of the muffin to you!" that sells only the tops of muffins, stealing the idea from Elaine. Enjoys cigars and botches a big merger with a Japanese company due to a nasty cold and no handkerchief to sneeze into. He declines to shake hands with the Japanese representative because of this and ruins the merger, causing Pendant Publishing to go bankrupt.
Justin Pitt	7	Ian Abercrombie	Elaine's second boss. Extremely wealthy business owner. He is a very picky individual and nearly impossible to please. Eats his Snickers bars with a knife and fork and requires that his white knee socks fit him perfectly and never fall down. Fired Elaine after he became convinced she had tried to murder him using a deadly drug interaction, using Jerry as an accomplice.
Mickey Abbott	7	Danny Woodburn	A quick-tempered little person actor. Typically appears with Kramer, with whom he is friends. He becomes angry if referred to as a "midget". Often appears in roles as children or elves (with Kramer at a department store). In "The Race", Mickey states that he has two children in college. In "The Yada Yada", Kramer states that Mickey has been married three times, and he marries for a fourth time at the end of the episode.
Russell Dalrymple	6	Bob Balaban	The president of NBC who works with Jerry and George on a television pilot. Became angry when he caught George (at Jerry's behest) ogling his large-breasted teenage daughter (played by Denise Richards) after a meeting and called off the deal, though it was later resurrected. He becomes obsessed with Elaine and quits NBC to join Greenpeace to impress her. He falls out of a small dinghy while chasing a whaling ship and he disappears and perishes at sea.
Kenny Bania	7	Steve Hytner	Stand-up comedian considered a 'hack' by Jerry and other comedians. Jerry especially dislikes him because he uses Jerry's act to warm up his audience. Though his profession plays no role in his first appearance, "The Soup", Jerry Seinfeld felt it was important to the character, since Bania's indomitable self-confidence is characteristic of a certain type of club comedian. Ovaltine is a main topic of his acts (Jerry: "He thinks anything that dissolves in milk is funny"). He has curious views on food and is obsessed with eating dinner at Mendy's Restaurant. Rolling Stone placed him at #17 in their list of the "100 Best Seinfeld Characters," close behind the stars and such fan favorites as Newman, David Puddy, Frank Costanza, J. Peterman, and Dr. Tim Whatley. Rolling Stone notes that Bania wants Jerry Seinfeld's approval so badly he'll do anything to gain it, and "also had a knack for putting a positive spin on almost everything. ("The best, Jerry! The best!") But all these traits, including the comedian's litany of jokes about things that dissolve in milk, made Seinfeld loathe him."
Crazy Joe Davola	5	Peter Crombie	Writer who suffers from mental problems. Attacked Kramer, blames Jerry for misfortunes, dated and stalked Elaine, going as far as taking photographs of her around town and even in her apartment with a telephoto lens. Depressed that Elaine rejected him, he dressed up as the clown from the opera Pagliacci and beat up several street toughs who antagonized him. He likes to leave his door open to "encourage intruders". Attacked Jerry at the filming of the Jerry pilot and was never heard from again.
Dugan	6	Joe Urla	Co-worker of Elaine at J. Peterman. Thinks that no one should make fun of pigs.
Jackie Chiles	7	Phil Morris	Kramer's eccentric but highly effective lawyer. Although very successful, he has had bad luck when representing Kramer. Favorite sayings are "Outrageous! Egregious! Preposterous!" Parody of Johnnie Cochran. After the group is convicted in the finale, Jackie confirms that Sidra, Jerry's ex-girlfriend, has breasts that are not only real, but "spectacular".
Larry	6	Lawrence Mandley	The manager or owner of Monk's Cafe, sometimes antagonized by the foursome's antics. Occasionally brandishes a gold earring.
Jack Klompus	6	Sandy Baron	Short-tempered resident of Phase Two of the Pines of Mar Gables who seems to consistently bear a grudge against Morty Seinfeld. Owns a fancy astronaut pen that he gives to Jerry under duress in "The Pen". Transitions from vice president to president of the condo association after making false allegations of Morty stealing from the treasury to buy a Cadillac in "The Cadillac". (Jerry bought the Cadillac for Morty, but the condo board members viewed this expense as implausible due to their dislike of Jerry's act.) After being initially unable to convince a majority of the board to impeach Morty, he calls the swing vote an "old bag", prompting her to remember Jerry stole her marble rye and change her vote. Morty is then impeached near-unanimously. Later gets a "sweetheart deal" from Jerry for Morty's Cadillac, then subsequently drives it into a swamp and loses the aforementioned pen.
Tim Whatley	5	Bryan Cranston	A dentist who was once dubbed "Dentist to the Stars" by George. In "The Yada Yada", he converts to Judaism, according to Jerry "just for the jokes". Jerry's anger at Whatley causes Kramer to call him an "anti-dentite". His giving Jerry a label maker he received from Elaine in the episode "The Label Maker" leads to the term "regifting". In "The Jimmy", Whatley irks Jerry by having Penthouse magazines in his waiting room and by possibly "violating" him while he was unconscious during a tooth filling. Also appears in the episodes "The Mom & Pop Store" and "The Strike".
Henry and Mrs. Ross	5	Warren Frost and Grace Zabriskie	Parents of Susan, George's fiancée. After Kramer burned down the family's cabin, it was revealed that Mr. Ross had had a homosexual affair with author John Cheever in "The Cheever Letters". Mrs. Ross is an alcoholic who disdains yet tolerates her husband. In the episode "The Wizard", the couple confirms George's longstanding suspicion that they never liked him, and blame him for Susan's death. In the finale, they become angry when Dr. Wexler mentions the look on George's face upon hearing the news of Susan's death. Mr. Ross is seen buying a gun after learning George was happy after Susan's death.
Jay Crespi and Stu Chernak	6	Peter Blood and Kevin Page	Two NBC employees who argue about raisins and George is able to spell their names. They appear in The Pitch, The Ticket, The Virgin, The Pilot, The Butter Shave (played by different actors), and the Finale

=== Other characters ===
- Ada (played by Vicki Lewis) – George's secretary at the New York Yankees. In the episode "The Secretary", George does not want to hire an attractive secretary so he could focus on his work, and in the interview process turned down a few women because they were so attractive. George ultimately hired Ada, whose efficiency impressed him. One day at work together, George becomes attracted to Ada, and the two make love. While having sex George blurts out that he's giving Ada a raise. Ada receives the raise, but it turns out that her new salary is higher than George's, much to his annoyance. In "The Race", Ada overhears George on the phone with a woman he met through The Daily Worker, and believes George is a communist. She tells Steinbrenner about this but instead of reprimanding him, Steinbrenner sends George to Cuba to recruit Cuban baseball players.
- Allison (played by Kari Coleman) – George's ex-girlfriend who he claims is obsessed with him, proven by the fact that she threatened to kill herself if George broke up with her. In the end of the episode "The Smelly Car", Allison compliments the vest of George's other ex-girlfriend, Susan, with whom she is seen watching the pilot program in a later episode, "The Pilot".

- Babu Bhatt (played by Brian George) – An immigrant from Pakistan who owns the nearby "Dream Café". Jerry seems to mess up his life at every turn, by giving bad business advice on his restaurant and by not passing on his immigration notice that is accidentally delivered to Jerry's mailbox. Babu thinks that Jerry is a "very, very bad man" (wagging his finger).

- Barbara "Babs" Kramer (played by Sheree North) – Cosmo Kramer's mother. She used to be a matron in the women's restroom at a restaurant, but was persuaded by Kramer to resign from that job and pursue an undefined venture with him. Although mentioned in "The Nose Job", her first on-screen appearance is in "The Switch" where she unintentionally reveals Kramer's first name to be Cosmo and has a sexual encounter with Newman. Babs was once addicted to alcohol and drugs, claiming to have been "clean" for two years.
- Beth Luchner (played by Debra Messing) – A physician who appears in "The Wait Out". Married first to David Luchner. Later appears in "The Yada Yada" with her new husband, Arnie.

- Bob and Ray/Cedric (played by Yul Vazquez and John Paragon) – A hostile gay couple who accost Cosmo Kramer in "The Soup Nazi", "The Sponge" and "The Puerto Rican Day". They are widely known as "street toughs". They steal Elaine's armoire that Kramer is guarding in "The Soup Nazi", verbally and physically attack him for not wearing an AIDS walk ribbon in "The Sponge", and attack him when he accidentally sets fire to a Puerto Rican flag. John Paragon's character is credited as "Ray" in "The Soup Nazi", but is addressed and credited as "Cedric" in "The Sponge".

- Bob Cobb (played by Mark Metcalf) – A conductor who prefers to be called "Maestro" and has a villa in Tuscany. Cobb introduced Kramer and Frank Costanza to the trick of taking their pants off before sitting so the pants will "keep the crease"
- Carol (played by Lisa Mende) – Mutual friend of the main characters. Carol and her husband, Michael, lived in the Hamptons, and she kept insisting that the group come out to see their baby. She had two babies, an unnamed daughter who was dropped by Kramer in "The Boyfriend", and a son named Adam (although unseen) who was introduced in "The Hamptons". Kramer once likened the cute baby to Lyndon Johnson while Elaine compared the ugly one to a Pekingese. Carol is notable for her nasal voice and her memorable quote: "You gotta see the baby!" or "You gotta have a baby!" in "The Soul Mate". Her final appearance was in "The English Patient", when she and her friends shunned Elaine after she showed her dislike for the film of the same name.
- Conrad: (played by Stephen Lee) – Also known as Connie or Con. Appears in "The Nap" as an indecisive contractor hired by Jerry to update the kitchen in his apartment. He also helped George sleep under his desk at Yankee Stadium.
- Counter Woman: (played by Kathryn Kates) – In the episodes "The Dinner Party" from season 5 and "The Rye" from season 7, the Counter Woman works at Schnitzer's Bakery. In season 5, the Counter Woman ignores the fact that Jerry and Elaine came in ahead of David and Barbara Benedict, a couple on their way to the same dinner party who purchase the last chocolate babka. The Counter Woman makes another appearance and is seemingly happy to give her last marble rye bread to Mabel Choate (a woman who was ahead of Jerry).
- Dana Foley: (played by Gina Hecht) – A friend of Elaine's who works as a therapist, and gives George several therapy sessions. She appears in "The Pick", "The Shoes" and "The Pilot". George walks out on her after she modestly criticizes the script of "Jerry".
- Deena: (played by Mary Jo Keenen) – A childhood friend of George who thinks that he is mentally unstable after she repeatedly catches him in bizarre situations. First, in "The Gum", she notices striking similarities between George's behavior and that of her mentally unstable father (affectionately known by all as 'Pop'), that being "nervousness, irritability, and paranoia". Her suspicions are heightened when she sees him walking down the street in a King Henry VIII costume telling people he just left the "institution". Then in "The Doll" she catches him in the coffee shop, alone and screaming at a doll that looks like his mother. Finally in "The Bottle Deposit", she is visiting her father at the mental asylum when she runs into a hysterical George (who was mistakenly sent there by Mr. Steinbrenner). She ignores his pleas to help him escape believing that he is finally getting the help he needs.
- Dolores (played by Susan Walters) – One of Jerry's many girlfriends; he can't remember her name, only that it rhymes with a female body part ("clitoris" doesn't occur to him and his best guess is "Mulva"). ("The Junior Mint"). Jerry reunites with her in "The Foundation".
- Donald Sanger, aka The Bubble Boy (voiced by Jon Hayman) – Jerry agrees to visit a bubble boy, who lives in a hermetically sealed bubble due to a compromised immune system. Jerry gets lost on the way and George and Susan end up meeting the bubble boy but find he is a bratty spoiled kid. George and Donald fight over a typographical error on a Trivial Pursuit card, which says the Moops (rather than the Moors) invaded Spain. The fight results in the boy's bubble being popped.
- Dr. Reston (played by Stephen McHattie) – Elaine and Crazy Joe Davola's therapist. Elaine dated him and went on a trip to Europe with him ("The Pitch" and "The Ticket").
- Earl Haffler (portrayed by O'Neal Compton) – Appeared in "The Diplomat's Club". He made bets with Kramer on which planes coming to the airport would arrive later than scheduled. Earl appears again in "The English Patient", where his deal with Kramer to buy "Cubans" falls through and he orders Cosmo out of his office.
- Father Curtis: (played by Henry Woronicz) – A priest who consults with Elaine and Puddy on their relationship in "The Burning", and with Jerry on his encounter with Tim Whatley in "The Yada Yada".
- Franklin Delano Romanowski (played by Mike McShane) – Also known as "FDR", Franklin is another of Kramer's eccentric friends. In "The Betrayal", he uses his birthday wish against Kramer as the result of a grudge held after Kramer struck him in the back of the head with a snowball. The same actor also appears briefly in "The Wizard" as the hot dog vendor talking with George. Although his character's name is not revealed, he is presumably the same character because he was seen selling hot dogs in "The Betrayal" also. He is mentioned by Kramer in several episodes, usually in some outrageous anecdote.
- Fred Yerkes: (played by Fred Stoller) – Elaine had met him at a party some time before, but his lack of recall for the meeting mesmerizes her. He appears in "The Secret Code" in Season 7.
- Gary Fogel (played by Jon Lovitz) made his only appearance in "The Scofflaw", although he is mentioned again in "The Face Painter".

- Izzy Mandelbaum (played by Lloyd Bridges) – Fellow resident of Jerry's parents in Del Boca Vista in Florida; head of family-owned Magic Pan crepe restaurants. His favorite saying is "It's go time!" He is obsessed with his physical fitness. In "The English Patient", he throws his back out twice after being "challenged" by Jerry. Izzy also appears in "The Blood".
- Jake Jarmel (played by Marty Rackham) – An author that Elaine dated for a period. Dislikes using exclamation marks in "The Sniffing Accountant". Broke up with Elaine after she bought Jujyfruits immediately after hearing he was in a car accident ("The Opposite"). Bought his glasses in Malaysia so no one else would have a pair like them ("The Scofflaw"). He started a fight with Mr. Lippman when he noticed that Lippman had the same "unique" frames as himself. The actor who plays Jake Jarmel also appears as an LAPD officer in the episode "The Trip".
- Jenna (played by Kristin Davis) – Jerry's girlfriend on Season's 8 "The Pothole". She later dates Kenny Bania, as shown in Season 9's "The Butter Shave".
- Jiffy Park Guy/Jiffy Dump Guy (played by Chaim Girafi) – An attendant at Jiffy Park who may or may not be utilizing George's car, along with other cars parked on the lot, as a den of iniquity for prostitutes to conduct their business in the episode "The Wig Master". His second appearance was in "The Muffin Tops" where he portrayed the late-night operator of sister-company Jiffy Dump who steadfastly refuses to accept trash bags of discarded muffin stumps.
- Joe Temple (played by Robert Hooks) – A family man with whom George watches Breakfast at Tiffany's in the episode "The Couch". Joe dislikes George after he spills grape juice on his couch. Joe also appears in "The Diplomat's Club", in which George tries to watch another film with him.
- Joel Rifkin (played by Anthony Cistaro) – Elaine's ex-boyfriend who coincidentally has the same name as serial killer Joel Rifkin. His first and only appearance was in "The Masseuse". Joel and Elaine break up because they cannot decide on whether his new name should be Remy, Alex, or Todd.
- Joey Zanfino (played by Todd Bosley) – A 9-year-old boy who lives in the same apartment building as Jerry, Kramer and Newman. Joey's mother asks Kramer to babysit him but due to his staggering walk (caused by his ultra-tight jeans), Joey mistakes him for Frankenstein's monster and runs away. By his second appearance, they are friends and go to the same karate class, despite Kramer being many years older. Joey and his friends later beat up Kramer because he beat them up in karate. He appears in both Season 7's "The Wait Out" and Season 8's "The Foundation". Joey is also mentioned in Season 9's "The Serenity Now", as he and his friends fight with Kramer.
- Karen (played by Lisa Edelstein) – George's girlfriend in "The Mango" and "The Masseuse".
- Karl (played by Ellis Williams) – A professional exterminator that Jerry hires to rid his apartment of fleas in "The Doodle". In "The Diplomat's Club", George befriends Karl in an attempt to prove to co-worker Mr. Morgan that he is not a racist.
- Katie (played by Debra Jo Rupp) – Jerry's annoying agent. First in "The Diplomat's Club", she invites the pilot of the plane to Jerry's comedy routine and tells Jerry not to be nervous, which makes Jerry extremely nervous and causes him to "bomb". Next in "The Abstinence", Katie gets Jerry an entire assembly at his former junior high school after Jerry is "bumped" at Career Day by a zoo worker. Jerry is unprepared for the assembly, and after he tells his first joke, he is met with boos. Consequently, David Letterman cancels Jerry's appearance on his talk show after hearing about his poor performance at the assembly.
- Keith Hernandez (played by Keith Hernandez) – fictionalized version of the baseball player, who befriends Jerry and later dates Elaine in "The Boyfriend".
- Kevin (played by Tim DeKay) – Elaine's one-time boyfriend, most notable for being "The Bizarro Jerry". He dates Elaine in two Season 8 episodes, "The Soul Mate" and "The Bizarro Jerry".
- Lannet (played by Amanda Peet) – Waitress Jerry dates in "The Summer of George" episode. She lives with a man which confounds Jerry as to her relationship with him.
- Leslie (played by Wendel Meldrum) – Kramer's "low-talking" girlfriend, a clothing designer who designed the new puffy shirt featured in "The Puffy Shirt" episode. She also appeared in "The Finale" as a witness in the trial, but her testimony is not accepted because no one in the courtroom can hear her. Jackie Chiles tells Judge Arthur Vandelay to either get Leslie a microphone or they should move on with the trial.
- Lindsay Enright (played by Jessica Hecht) – An ex-girlfriend of George's who was in a book club in "The Couch". They were supposed to read Breakfast at Tiffany's, but George watched the film instead and made incorrect statements about the book. She then appears in "The Gymnast".

- Lloyd Braun (played first by Peter Keleghan, then by Matt McCoy) – A childhood friend of George. Estelle Costanza used to badger George with questions such as, "Why can't you be more like Lloyd Braun?" In "The Non-Fat Yogurt", Lloyd works for New York City mayor David Dinkins. After Lloyd passes along Elaine's suggestion that everyone in the city wear name tags, he is ridiculed, fired, and has a nervous breakdown. (Note: Two versions of the episode, which aired two days after the 1993 New York City mayoral election, were shot. If Dinkins had won the election, Lloyd would have been depicted working for the mayoral candidate Rudy Giuliani.) After spending time in a mental institution, Lloyd helps Kramer gain historical status for a movie theater in "The Gum". In "The Serenity Now", Lloyd works for a short time for Frank Costanza as a computer salesman. In an attempt to outsell Lloyd, George purchases a large number of computers with the intent to return them once Lloyd has been fired for poor performance. It is later revealed that all of Lloyd's sales were fabricated and that Frank complied with the ruse in order to give George someone to compete against. Larry David named the Lloyd Braun character after the real-life Lloyd Braun, who was David's lawyer and manager.
- Lt. Joe Bookman (played by Philip Baker Hall) – A library cop who pursues Jerry because of an overdue copy of Tropic of Cancer, which Jerry had borrowed in 1971. Bookman's dedication to his job and coincidental surname are cause for Jerry's dismissive attitude toward him. Bookman's character is defined by his deadpan delivery (a parody of Sgt. Joe Friday in Dragnet), and his tendency to flip his trench coat dramatically during interrogations. Appears in "The Library" and "The Finale, Part 2".
- Mabel Choate (played by Frances Bay) – The old woman at Schnitzer's bakery who bought the infamous last marble rye, which Jerry went on to steal from her on the street in order to give to George to carry out one of his numerous idiotic schemes. She reappeared in a later episode at Phase Two of the Pines of Mar Gables to cast the deciding vote in Morty's impeachment, when she recognized Jerry as the thief of her rye. She also appears in the final episode of the series as a witness testifying against Jerry, again bringing up the marble rye.
- Marcelino (played by Miguel Sandoval) – The owner of the bodega on Jerry's block. In Season 8 "The Little Jerry", he runs an illegal cockfighting ring in the back of his store. In "The Millennium", Kramer mentions that Marcelino is 1/64 Mayan. Marcelino also appears in "The Finale" where he testifies about the cockfighting ring where he only quoted "cockfighting".
- Marla Penny aka "The Virgin" (played by Jane Leeves) – A professional closet organizer whom Jerry dates. She eventually loses her virginity to John F. Kennedy Jr. She appears in "The Virgin", "The Contest", Part Two of "The Pilot" and "The Finale".
- Matthew (played by John Christian Graas) – Son of the purveyor of the "fat-free" yogurt, Matthew is a 10-year-old boy who idolizes Jerry. In "The Non-Fat Yogurt" he overhears Jerry swearing, and, following his idol's lead, refers to Jerry as a "funny fucker". He ruins an audiocassette of Jerry's comedy. When the yogurt is revealed to have fat, Matthew cusses out Jerry. Matthew first appears in "The Parking Space" in season 3 and puts in his two cents over whether George has a parking space.
- Mel Sanger (played by Brian Doyle-Murray) – A Yoo-Hoo truck driver who is the father of Donald Sanger. Mel appears to be very loving, but is frustrated about several things, including when people believe the bubble is like an igloo and the fact that his son Donald has the TV remote constantly. He appeared in "The Bubble Boy", "The Pilot" Pt. 2, and "The Finale" Pt. 2.
- Mike Moffit (played by Lee Arenberg) – Calls Jerry a "phony" behind his back and gets into an argument with George over a parking space in front of Jerry's apartment ("The Parking Space"). He also appears as Kramer's bookie in "The Susie", in which Jerry accidentally breaks his thumbs and traps him in the trunk of Jerry's car.

- Mr. Kruger (played by Daniel von Bargen) – President of Kruger Industrial Smoothing, for which George Costanza works during most of the ninth and final season. Kruger is noted for his total apathy towards his job and the success of his company. George's description of the company is "Kruger Industrial Smoothing: 'We don't care, and it shows'" ("The Strike"). George is often forced to push Kruger to do his work, to which Kruger usually responds, "I'm not too worried about it." He also attends the Festivus dinner. Kruger's company "botched the Statue of Liberty" job as they "couldn't get the green stuff off" and is infamous for losing money (when viewing the company financial reports Kruger nonchalantly exclaimed, "wow, we really took it on the chin last year"). Kruger appears in four episodes: "The Slicer", "The Strike", "The Burning" and "The Maid".
- Mr. Morgan (played by Tom Wright) – A co-worker of George's at Yankee Stadium. He appears in four episodes, "The Pledge Drive", where George convinces Mr. Morgan that the Yankees should send a player to a PBS fundraiser after he sees George eating a candy bar with a knife and fork; "The Diplomat's Club", where he hints that George had a racial bias after George said that he looked like Sugar Ray Leonard; "The Mom and Pop Store", where George calls a meeting to convince the Yankees to have a "Jon Voight Day", and Mr. Morgan proposes they have no more meetings called by George; and "The Wink", where George causes a dispute with Mr. Morgan, his wife, and Mr. Steinbrenner by winking involuntarily, ultimately leading to Mr. Morgan's termination, and George being promoted to his position. Despite their adverse relationship in earlier episodes, in "The Wink" he tells George that he is his only friend at the Yankees office.
- Mr. Tomasulo (played by Gordon Jump) – George's boss at "Play Now" in episodes 1 and 2 of Season 9, "The Butter Shave" and "The Voice".
- Mrs. Landis (played by Gail Strickland) – A boss at Doubleday. She appeared twice in Season Six, in the episodes "The Chaperone" and "The Switch". She interviews Elaine for a job but thinks that she does not have enough grace.
- Mrs. Zanfino (played by Diana Castle) – A woman who lives with her son Joey in the same apartment building as Jerry, Kramer and Newman. She asks Kramer to babysit Joey in Season 7's "The Wait Out", and appears again in Season 8's "The Foundation", when she drives Kramer, Joey and a few other kids from the Karate class. Mrs. Zanfino is also mentioned in Season 8's "The Fatigues", when Kramer is cooking food for a Jewish singles night, and uses her kitchen to make Kugel.
- Nana (played by Billye Ree Wallace) – Nana is Jerry's grandmother and the mother of Helen Seinfeld and Uncle Leo. When her mind starts to mix up the present and the past, she reveals that Uncle Leo owes his sister, Jerry's mom, $50 from a racetrack bet their father won when they were kids.
- Noreen (played by Kelly Coffield) – A former US Army soldier and friend of Elaine's who dated Dan, the high talker. Elaine continually destroyed Noreen's life until Kramer intervened and urged her to return to the military. She attempted to commit suicide, but Frank Costanza's cape-wearing lawyer (played by Larry David) stopped her.
- Peggy (played by Megan Cole) – She appeared in season 8 "The Susie" as Elaine's coworker at J. Peterman Catalog who mistakes Elaine for someone named Susie. She also appears in a season 9 episode "The Apology" and revealed to be a germophobe.
- Ping (played by Ping Wu) – A Chinese food delivery boy, who sues Elaine after hitting a car while trying to avoid colliding with her as she is jaywalking as mentioned in "The Visa". In "The Tape", when George calls a Chinese company to order hair growth cream, Ping acts as the interpreter.
- Poppie (played by Reni Santoni) – The owner of an Italian restaurant who disapproves of abortion, tells traumatizing stories of his mother's life under Communist rule, is very strict on his idea of what pizza is, and developed stress-activated incontinence because of Elaine, which further causes him to stain Jerry's couch ("The Couch"). The "Poppie couch" turns up in "The Doorman". First appeared in "The Pie", in which Jerry, visiting Poppie's restaurant while dating his daughter Audrey, is disgusted by Poppie's neglecting to wash his hands in the bathroom. Also appears in "The Finale".
- Rabbi Glickman (played by Bruce Mahler) – A rabbi who befriends Elaine, makes a clumsy play for her at one point, and is a terrible secret keeper. He appears in "The Postponement" (in which he is instead called Rabbi Kirschbaum), "The Serenity Now", "The Finale" and a deleted scene in "The Hot Tub".
- Rachel Goldstein (played by Melanie Smith) – Jerry's most dated girlfriend in the series, having appeared in four episodes (counting a two-part episode as two episodes). In "The Raincoats", she and Jerry make out while watching Schindler's List and are seen by Newman, who informs Jerry's and Rachel's parents of the incident. Her father tells Jerry she won't be seeing him again, but forgives him after Jerry gives him kishka. In "The Hamptons", Rachel accidentally walks in on George naked while he is a victim of "shrinkage", having just gotten out of the pool. She tells George's girlfriend, who immediately returns home. In "The Opposite", she breaks up with Jerry.
- Ramon (played by Carlos Jacott) – A creepy pool guy at Jerry's health club who tries to become friends with Jerry. He later becomes friends with Newman. He is fired from the health club for using too much chlorine but gets his job back. He is nearly killed when Jerry pulls him into the pool and Newman dives in. Jerry and Newman don't give him CPR and have their gym memberships terminated for their behavior ("The Pool Guy"). He also appears in the courtroom in "The Finale". A deleted scene has him mentioning how Jerry and Newman argued over who would perform CPR on him.
- Rebecca DeMornay (played by Sonya Eddy) – A thrift store clerk and former book store clerk who is in a constant state of agitation and is prone to violence. In another episode she works with the homeless. She once threatened to jump over the counter and punch George "in the brain" after he brought in a used book that had been in the toilet. In one episode she confronted Elaine in an enraged manner over Muffin bottoms that had been left behind the homeless shelter she worked at. Appears in "The Bookstore" and "The Muffin Tops".
- Remy Temple (played by Diana Theodore) – Joe Temple's daughter. She is a great fan of Audrey Hepburn and watched Breakfast at Tiffany's with her father and George in "The Couch". She appears again in "The Diplomat's Club" when George brings another Audrey Hepburn film, but her father tells her to get up to the apartment instantly before George came up.
- Ricky (played by Sam Lloyd) – The man who takes Frank Constanza's TV Guide from Elaine in the subway and later turns it into a bouquet to declare his affection for her during "The Cigar Store Indian". He briefly appears in a later episode "The Pie", where it is revealed he designed a mannequin which looks like Elaine.
- Robin (played by Melanie Chartoff) – A waitress at the comedy club. She is George's girlfriend in "The Fire", but breaks up with him for his cowardice over a small kitchen fire at her son's birthday party. She appears in "The Finale" Pt. 2, where she recaps the incident at her son's birthday party.
- Rusty (played by Jon Gries) – A homeless man who falsely identifies Kramer in a police lineup and is hired by Kramer and Newman as labor for their short-lived rickshaw venture. During his trial run, Rusty stole the rickshaw. He appears in "The Beard" and "The Bookstore".
- Sal Bass (played by Tony Amendola): Kramer meets him at the health club and thinks he is Salman Rushdie. In "The Pilot", Sal Bass is shown watching Jerry's pilot program with Sidra. Out of the blue, Bass remarks, "You know, that Kim Novak had some really large breasts."

- Sally Weaver (played by Kathy Griffin) – Susan Ross's roommate in college who lived in Memphis, Tennessee, she appears in "The Cartoon" and "The Doll" as an aspiring actress and comedian now living in Manhattan. In "The Doll", she was directly responsible for ruining Jerry's bit for The Charles Grodin Show, not once but twice. In "The Cartoon" she becomes famous and even gets a cable special for her one-woman show, titled "Jerry Seinfeld is the Devil". In "The Doll", it is revealed that Sally was an executive at Federal Express.
- Scott Drake (played by Rick Overton): A mutual friend of the main characters, often referred to as "the Drake". Jerry, George, Elaine and Kramer give him and his fiancée a big screen TV as a wedding gift. They break up and his ex-fiancée, the "Drakette", gives it away to charity. In "The Pilot, Part 2", the Drake and Drakette have gotten back together and watch Jerry's pilot program on a small, handheld black and white television. In "The Label Maker", he is engaged to marry the Drakette again, but they break up after he learns that the wedding is on the same day as the Super Bowl and tries to postpone it.
- Shlomo: (played by Reuven Bar-Yotam): Appears in Season 8's "The Muffin Tops" as a foreign guy on Kramer's "Peterman Reality Tour" bus, who questions the pizza-pound cake. In Season 9's "The Frogger", he appears again as Shlomo the truck driver, who George hires to help him move the Frogger machine.
- Sid (played by Jay Brooks): Professional car parker. George fills in for him briefly in "The Alternate Side" and fails miserably, causing Sid's nephew to lose his foot to amputation because George's incompetence caused several of Sid's regular customers to quit. This created a significant loss of income to Sid, thereby rendering him unable to finance his nephew's operation. Sid appears again in "The Parking Space".
- Sid Farkus (played by Patrick Cronin): Middle-manager of a women's underwear manufacturing company and friend of Frank Costanza. Interviews George for a bra salesman position and ends up hiring him, only to reverse his decision after George hits on Sid's boss Ellen De Granmont (Christa Miller) ("The Sniffing Accountant"). Later meets with Frank and Kramer to discuss manufacturing the bro/manssiere in "The Doorman". Wears Ban-Lon. He dates Estelle Costanza briefly while she and Frank are separated.
- Sidra Holland (played by Teri Hatcher): Jerry's date in "The Implant". Known for her breasts and her confident declaration that "They're real and they're spectacular." She also appears in "The Pilot", watching Jerry's pilot program with Sal Bass, and in "The Finale", sleeping with Jackie Chiles.

- Sue Ellen Mischke (played by Brenda Strong): Known as the "bra-less wonder", heiress to the Oh Henry! candy bar fortune, and nemesis of Elaine, whom she has known since they attended high school in Maryland together. In "The Caddy", Elaine is so incensed that Sue Ellen doesn't wear a bra that she gives her a bra as a gift, which Sue Ellen then wears as a top. That causes Kramer to crash George's car when he and Jerry see her walking down the street. In "The Betrayal", Sue Ellen invites Elaine to India for her wedding. Elaine and Sue Ellen briefly reconcile before it is revealed that Elaine once had a relationship with Sue Ellen's groom. She also appears in "The Bottle Deposit, Part 1" and "The Abstinence".
- The Doctor (Siegel/Wexler) (played by Victor Raider-Wexler): The doctor who performed the surgery in "The Junior Mint", he was also the doctor who broke the news of Susan's death in "The Invitations" and who diagnosed George's atrophied condition in "The Summer of George". Also testified in "The Finale" about George's reaction to the news of Susan's death, which he described as "restrained jubilation" which caused Susan's parents to be angry with him.
- The Soup Nazi (played by Larry Thomas): Based on a real person (Al Yeganeh), the Soup Nazi is a soup chef who often denied customers his delicious soup for the slightest misbehavior with the admonition, "NO soup for you!" The character's name, revealed in "The Finale", is Yev Kassem.
- Tia Van Camp (played by Jennifer Campbell): Blonde supermodel whom Jerry is seated next to on an airplane flight back to New York ("The Airport"). Jerry gets a date with Tia. She eventually dumps Jerry in "The Pick" when she notices him in his car, appearing to pick his nose.
- Tina Robbins: (played by Siobhan Fallon Hogan): A "waitress/actress" (although she considers herself an "actress/waitress") who is Elaine's roommate in her original apartment, later moving out and sub-letting it to her. She is introduced in "The Deal" and dates Kramer in "The Truth", much to the dismay of Elaine, who complains about the loud tribal music and sexual noises in her apartment. Elaine describes her acting as "Ethel Merman, but without the talent". She makes a brief appearance in "The Opposite", kicking Elaine out of her apartment for, among other things, buzzing up a jewel thief and using Canadian quarters in the washing machine.
- Vanessa (played by Lynn Clark): An attractive woman whom Jerry meets at a birthday party in "The Stake Out" (Season 1, Episode 2). They date once in "The Stock Tip" (Season 1, Episode 5).
- Walter (played by Wayne Wilderson): Co-worker of Elaine at J. Peterman. He appears in four episodes: "The Summer of George", "The Merv Griffin Show", "The Apology" and "The Frogger".
- Wyck Thayer (played by Bruce Davison): Chairman of the Susan Ross Foundation, who assumes that George actually killed Susan. Appeared in the first two episodes of the eighth season, as well as "The Van Buren Boys" later in the same season. George consistently calls Wyck "Wink".

=== Unseen characters ===
- Bob Sacamano – One of Kramer's best friends, who is often referred to as the source of nutty ideas or inaccurate information. Writer Larry Charles created the character after his real-life friend of the same name. He is from New Jersey. In "The Heart Attack", Kramer explains how Bob had a botched hernia operation, so that now he has a high-pitched voice and spends his days in a wheelchair. He also had rabies at some point. Bob worked, for a time, in a condom factory and provided a bag of defective condoms to Kramer in "The Fix-Up", which George then used with Elaine's friend, briefly thinking he had impregnated her as a result. Bob once stayed at Kramer's apartment as a guest for a year and a half. Bob also befriended Jerry when Jerry and Kramer switch apartments; Jerry adds that Bob sells Russian hats in Battery Park for $40: the hats are made from nutria, a type of rodent, instead of sable. In the ninth season episode "The Wizard", Kramer states that Bob Sacamano's father (Bob Sacamano Sr.) lives in Florida; he's the source of faulty electronic organizers known as "Willards" (instead of the more expensive "Wizards") that foil Kramer's run for condo board president. Although Sacamano himself is never seen, Sacamano Sr. appears in a deleted scene.
- Cousin Jeffrey – Jerry's horse-faced cousin, about whom Uncle Leo always raves. He worked for the New York City Department of Parks and Recreation. Jeffrey once got Jerry tickets to a Paul Simon concert, and George, sans eyeglasses, once claimed to see Jeffrey kissing Jerry's girlfriend in the street (it turned out to be a policewoman patting a horse). According to Uncle Leo, Jeffrey's favorite animal is the leopard because he likes the spots, and he keeps in close contact with his college botany professor, a friendship which Leo thinks is rare. Jeffrey received a citation from the city for his edible foliage tour through Central Park. The back of Cousin Jeffrey's head can be seen in the deleted scenes for "The Glasses" episode on the season DVD.
- Lomez – An unseen friend of Kramer's. He is an Orthodox Jew, "old school", according to Kramer in "The Fatigues". In "The Betrayal", Kramer bangs on the door of a portable toilet yelling "Come on Lomez, we're going to miss the movie!" When Kramer starts the Peterman Reality Bus Tour in "The Muffin Tops", he notes Lomez's place of worship on the tour. Kramer purchases a hot tub from Lomez and speaks on the phone to him while taking a shower in "The Apology". In "The Package", Kramer tells Jerry that he traded his stereo to Lomez for some steaks. In "The Voice", Kramer's intern Darren tells Jerry and George that "Mr. Kramer's in a meeting with Mr. Lomez". And in "The Van Buren Boys", one of the Susan Ross Scholarship interviewees is credited, although not mentioned, as Lomez Junior. His relation, if any, to Lomez remains unknown as his only line is "You like that, don't you?" when George mentions that he has a 4.0 GPA. In "The Slicer", Kramer tells Elaine that Lomez blew his neighbor's circuit to stop an incessant alarm, prompting her to do the same. Later in the same episode, Kramer tells Elaine that, in blowing his neighbor's circuit, Lomez caused the automatic cat feeder to stop functioning, resulting in incessant meowing from the neighbor's cat. When Elaine asks Kramer what Lomez did about it, he replies that "He moved to a motel and the cat eventually died."

=== Imaginary characters and pseudonyms ===
- Art Vandelay – George's imaginary alter-ego, which is referenced in many episodes. In "The Finale", the name of the judge is coincidentally Arthur Vandelay.
- Kel Varnsen – An alias used by Jerry in "The Boyfriend", in order to help George with his Vandelay Industries. He also uses this alias in "The Puerto Rican Day".
- H. E. Pennypacker – Kramer appears as H. E. Pennypacker, "a wealthy industrialist". In order to help Elaine get revenge on Putumayo in "The Millennium", Kramer (as "Pennypacker") attempts to use his pricing gun to greatly reduce the prices of the store's clothing. When Kramer inadvertently crushes the pricing gun, he removes the desiccants from some of the clothes (which will make clothes noticeably musty in five years), and tells Gladys Mayo, "I think I'm going to build a roller coaster instead." He also uses the alias in "The Puerto Rican Day" where he poses as a buyer interested in an apartment in order to use its bathroom.
- Martin van Nostrand or Peter von Nostrand – As Dr. Martin von Nostrand, Kramer tried to get Elaine's medical chart in "The Package". He also used the von Nostrand alias in "The Slicer", posing as a Juilliard-trained dermatologist, and is recognized as Dr. von Nostrand in "The Strike". Kramer used the name Martin von Nostrand (without the "doctor" prefix) while auditioning for the role of himself on the show Jerry in "The Pilot, Part 1". Kramer posed as Professor Peter von Nostrand in "The Nose Job" in order to retrieve a jacket from another man's apartment.

=== Seinfeld's girlfriends ===
A number of actresses made guest appearances as Seinfeld's love interests in single episodes:

- Isabel (Tawny Kitaen) – "The Nose Job" (season 3, episode 9)
- Nina (Catherine Keener) – "The Letter" (season 3, episode 20)
- Marla (Jane Leeves) – "The Virgin" (season 4, episode 10)
- Sidra (Teri Hatcher) – "The Implant" (season 4, episode 19)
- Amy (Anna Gunn) – "The Glasses" (season 5, episode 3)
- Jody (Jennifer Coolidge) – "The Masseuse" (season 5, episode 9)
- Jane (Jami Gertz) – "The Stall" (season 5, episode 12)
- Meryl (Courteney Cox) – "The Wife" (season 5, episode 17)
- Margaret (Marita Geraghty) - "The Big Salad" (season 6, episode 2)
- Sheila (Ali Wentworth) - "The Soup Nazi" (season 7, episode 6)
- Jeannie (Janeane Garofalo) – "The Invitations" (season 7, episode 24)
- Ellen (Christine Taylor) – "The Van Buren Boys" (season 8, episode 14)
- Jenna (Kristin Davis) – "The Pothole" (season 8, episode 16)
- Beth (Debra Messing) – "The Yada Yada" (season 8, episode 19)
- Valerie (Lauren Graham) – "The Millennium" (season 8, episode 20)
- Alex (Melinda Clarke) – "The Muffin Tops" (season 8, episode 21)
- Lanette (Amanda Peet) – "The Summer of George" (season 8, episode 22)
- Patty (Lori Loughlin) – "The Serenity Now" (season 9, episode 3)
- Sara (Marcia Cross) – "The Slicer" (season 9, episode 7)
