= The Burning (Seinfeld) =

- Seinfeld episode
- Episode no.: Season 9 Episode 16
- Directed by: Andy Ackerman
- Written by: Jennifer Crittenden
- Production code: 916
- Original air date: March 19, 1998
- Running time: 23 minutes

Guest appearances
- Patrick Warburton as David Puddy; Danny Woodburn as Mickey Abbott; Daniel von Bargen as Mr. Kruger; Cindy Ambuehl as Sophie; Henry Woronicz as Father Curtis; Ursaline Bryant as Dr. Wexler; Daniel Dae Kim as Student #1; Alex Craig Mann as Student #2; Brian Posehn as Artie; Alec Holland as Co-Worker #1; Suli McCullough as Co-Worker #2; Ruth Cohen as Ruthie Cohen (uncredited); Julie Wagner as Medical Student (uncredited)

Episode chronology
← Previous "The Wizard"	Next → "The Bookstore"
- Seinfeld season 9

"The Burning" is the sixteenth episode of the ninth and final season of the NBC sitcom Seinfeld, and the 172nd episode overall. This episode first aired on March 19, 1998. It was written by Jennifer Crittenden and directed by Andy Ackerman.

In this episode, Elaine learns that her boyfriend David Puddy is religious, Jerry does not recognize his girlfriend's voice on the phone when she greets him with "It's me", Kramer and Mickey act out sick conditions for medical students and George tries to garner respect by walking out on Kruger meetings at comedic high notes.

== Plot ==
Elaine thinks that her boyfriend David Puddy may be religious after finding Christian rock stations set on his car radio. She tells George and Jerry about Puddy's car radio, and George suggests altering his radio presets as a test. Elaine later finds Puddy has switched the stations back to Christian rock. Puddy confirms that he is religious and does not care that Elaine is not, because he is "not the one going to Hell." Elaine is frustrated at his lack of concern. Elaine and Puddy seek the advice of a priest about their relationship, and the priest informs them that they are both going to Hell for premarital sex, much to Elaine's delight.

George laments to Jerry about losing respect at a work meeting with a poorly received joke. Jerry suggests that George use the Vegas showmanship trick of leaving the room after a comedic high note. At the next meeting, George takes Jerry's suggestion and leaves the room after a well-received joke, but his showmanship backfires when Mr. Kruger throws everyone else off a large project because they are boring in comparison. George has to do all the actual work on the project as Kruger constantly makes excuses and goofs off. When George tries to get Kruger to work, Kruger makes silly comments and walks off on a high note, leaving George with a mountain of paperwork.

Kramer and Mickey Abbott get an acting gig playing sick for medical students and are assigned gonorrhea and bacterial meningitis, respectively. Kramer gives an impressive theatrical performance surrounding the burning sensation during urination for the med students. Kramer is concerned about being typecast when the hospital wants him to perform gonorrhea again the next week, due to his stellar performance. Kramer is attacked by Mickey after trying to take over Mickey's assigned role of cirrhosis of the liver.

Jerry's girlfriend Sophie calls him with an "it's me" greeting, but he does not recognize her voice. When Sophie uses the unwelcome "it's me" greeting on Jerry's answering machine, George suggests he return the favor when he calls back. Sophie does not recognize Jerry's voice on the phone; thinking that Jerry is a different friend, she reveals that she has not told Jerry about an incident she calls "the tractor story", leaving George and Jerry to speculate on what the tractor story may be. Jerry sees a scar on Sophie's leg and assumes it was from a tractor accident; Sophie tries to tell Jerry the tractor story, but he tells her that he already knows about it. Kramer and Mickey enter, still arguing about being given (the role of) gonorrhea, and Sophie tells them her tractor story: that she got gonorrhea from riding a tractor in her bathing suit. Kramer tells her that her story is impossible, but she maintains this was what her boyfriend told her happened (with the implication that her boyfriend gave her gonorrhea). After hearing this, Jerry breaks up with her, leaving the relationship on a comedic high note.

== Production ==
Jennifer Crittenden wrote the episode. This episode is dedicated to the memory of Lloyd Bridges, who died on March 10, 1998. Bridges played Izzy Mandelbaum in "The English Patient" and "The Blood".

Mickey actor Danny Woodburn did his performance of cirrhosis of the liver as a William Shatner impression because he knew that George actor Jason Alexander was a big fan of Star Trek and would get a laugh out of it.

"The tractor story" is an homage to the Happy Days episode "Fonzie the Substitute", which similarly has its comedic climax when a troubled young woman reveals she thought she got pregnant by necking in a bathing suit.

== Reception ==
"The Burning" first aired at 9:00 p.m. EST on March 19, 1998, and achieved a Nielsen rating of 20.8. Vance Durgin wrote in the Orange County Register, "Solidly in the tradition of the show's fabled irreverence, a funny first half was followed by a more absurd second half marred by the jokey priest and the absurd tractor story angle. But you can't expect a masterpiece this late in the series run." The A.V. Club's David Sims said: "Here we have (excluding the finale) the last appearance of Puddy, and one of the best! ... But even though Kruger is particularly funny in this episode (making his chair spin three times without using his feet), George's frustration feels a little lacking in context."

In his ranking of the 169 Seinfeld episodes, Vulture's Larry Fitzmaurice rated "The Burning" 28th, writing: "This was a great example of Seinfeld's writers skirting the boundaries of '90s network TV to break taboos — specifically talk of sexually transmitted diseases (gonorrhea from a tractor?). But "The Burning" isn't just successful because of its provocative nature. Any episode with Puddy is a relative gem, and his and Elaine's ongoing argument over whether she is going to Hell ends in a revelation that fits Seinfeld to a T: They both are — and so are the rest of the cast, too."

== Analysis ==
"The Burning" is one of the few Seinfeld episodes in which religion plays a prominent role, with Puddy's Christianity contrast against Elaine's lack of religious belief. Whitley Kaufman, in his book Seinfeld and the Comic Vision, interpreted this subplot as highlighting the "emptiness and hypocrisy" of religious convictions, consistent with the series' treatment of religion in other episodes. Philosopher Justin D. Barnard cited the episode as a notable example of Hell being treated comedically in popular culture. The episode's use of a Jesus fish represents the symbol's most prominent use in popular culture, signalling its newfound status as a "cultural icon." Barry Brummett criticized the episode's portrayal of Mickey as someone "easily offended, quick to anger, and prone to aggressive behaviour", which he perceived as stereotypical of people with dwarfism.
