= The Voice (Seinfeld) =

- Seinfeld episode
- Episode no.: Season 9 Episode 2
- Directed by: Andy Ackerman
- Written by: Alec Berg & Jeff Schaffer & David Mandel
- Production code: 902
- Original air date: October 2, 1997

Guest appearances
- Patrick Warburton as David Puddy; Gordon Jump as Mr. Thomassoulo; Sarah Peterson as Claire; Jarrad Paul as Darin; Ella Joyce as Dean Jones; Nancy Balbirer as Alice; Brian J. Williams as Glenn; Cindy Wu as Worker; Ruth Cohen as Ruthie Cohen (uncredited)

Episode chronology
← Previous "The Butter Shave"	Next → "The Serenity Now"
- Seinfeld season 9

"The Voice" is the 158th episode of the NBC sitcom Seinfeld. This was the second episode for the ninth and final season. It aired on October 2, 1997. The episode's title refers to a joke Jerry and his friends share about his girlfriend's stomach having a voice, which ends up coming between Jerry and his girlfriend. Meanwhile, a chance encounter with David Puddy leads to Elaine renewing their relationship, George sticks with a job where his co-workers all hate him because he has a one-year contract with the company, and Kramer hires an intern and works with him on creating an oil bladder system.

== Plot ==
George's employer, Play Now, wants to get rid of him after finding out he isn't really disabled, but cannot fire him because he has a one-year contract. When George turns down his boss's request that he quit, he tries to drive George out by moving him into a derelict office, spiking his food, and even barricading his office door, but George continues to show up to work each day.

Jerry is dating a woman named Claire. Behind her back, Jerry jokes that her stomach has a voice, which he lampoons by saying "Helloooo!" Jerry tells Claire about "the voice." Offended, she leaves him. She says they can only get back together if he agrees to never do the voice again. Jerry agonizes and decides he prefers the voice. However, all his friends say they have grown tired of the voice. He talks to Claire and agrees to stop doing the voice.

At Monk's Café, David Puddy passes by and exchanges greetings with Elaine. Jerry tells Elaine that because of this "bump-into," she is destined to backslide into her relationship with Puddy. She bets him $50 that she won't. The next day, Jerry notices Elaine is still wearing the same clothes. Elaine insists she is not in a relationship with Puddy, even after she admits that she both dined out and had sex with him. However, after Puddy comments on how much he prefers their casual sex arrangement to dating her, Elaine officially renews their relationship to spite him. Elaine and Jerry agree to a double or nothing bet, but she continues to slide back to Puddy. Finally Elaine tells Puddy that she has realized they are meant to be together and should stop the on-off pattern of their relationship, but he wants to break up.

Kramer contends that day-to-day incidental tasks are preventing him from realizing all his big ideas. He gets an intern named Darin from New York University to assist him with his corporation, "Kramerica Industries," leaving him free to develop ideas such as a rubber bladder to prevent oil tanker spills. The university cancels Darin's internship when they find that Kramerica Industries is not a real business and Darin is performing personal tasks for Kramer. However, Darin returns on his own because he believes in Kramerica Industries.

Play Now offers to buy George out of his contract for six months' pay. When he refuses, they open his private bathroom to other employees. In retaliation, George suggests that Kramer test his bladder system at Play Now's offices using one of their rubber balls as the bladder. As Kramer and Darin push the ball of oil out a window, Jerry notices Claire waiting for him just below. He tries to warn her by shouting "Hello!" but she thinks he is doing "the voice" again and does not listen.

Claire files a lawsuit which drives Play Now into bankruptcy, leaving George unemployed and without severance pay. Darin takes the blame for dropping the oil ball on Claire and goes to prison. The incident makes "the voice" popular among Jerry's friends again.

== Production ==
This episode was originally going to be titled "The Backslide," and the production script was titled "The Bladder System".

The basis of the talking stomach was Seinfeld writer Spike Feresten's real life experience of imagining his girlfriend's butt talking to him while she slept. He recounted the idea to his fellow writers on Seinfeld, where the butt's "voice" became an inside joke. After the writing staff incorporated it into an episode, Jerry Seinfeld decided to change it to her belly button talking to him, so that it wouldn't appear to be a cheap joke. The writers recognized that the talking butt/stomach joke didn't make sense and intended the humor to come out of Jerry and his friends' enthusiasm for the joke rather than the joke itself, feeling that most people could relate to enjoying a joke that doesn't make sense to anyone outside their circle of friends. Feresten told his girlfriend about the voice and that they were making an entire Seinfeld episode around it, and she became offended and walked out on him. When told about this, Seinfeld said they should use it as a scene in the episode and encouraged Feresten to talk to his girlfriend again and write down what happened.

The scene at the pier where Jerry makes a decision between being with Claire and doing The Voice is an in-joke in itself as it alludes to previous pier scenes in "The Invitations" and "The Engagement".

The character Darin was named after Darin Henry, Larry David's assistant (who also wrote a handful of Seinfeld episodes after David's departure from the series).

The George story was partially inspired by a behind-the-scenes incident on The Cosby Show. The show's producers asked one of the writers to leave the show so that they could hire another writer whom they found preferable. The writer already on staff refused to quit and continued to show up to work despite the antagonism of his bosses, since his contract required that he be paid for a year. Eventually his bosses resorted to buying him out of his contract just to get rid of him.

Sequences which were too complicated to film before a studio audience, such as Elaine's backsliding montage, were filmed on September 1, 1997, and the audience taping was done on September 3.
