= The Foundation (Seinfeld) =

- Seinfeld episode
- Episode no.: Season 8 Episode 1
- Directed by: Andy Ackerman
- Written by: Alec Berg & Jeff Schaffer
- Production code: 801
- Original air date: September 19, 1996

Guest appearances
- Janeane Garofalo as Jeannie; Susan Walters as Dolores; Bruce Davison as Wyck; Grace Zabriskie as Mrs. Ross; Warren Frost as Mr. Ross; John O'Hurley as J. Peterman; Joe Urla as Dugan; Todd Bosley as Joey; Diana Castle as Mrs. Zanfino; Stuart Quan as Sensei; Herb Mitchell as Businessman #1; Robert Louis Kempf as Businessman #2; Lawrence Mandley as Larry; Lauren Bowles as Waitress #1; Peggy Lane as Waitress #2; Paige Tamada as Clara; Robert Padnick as Willie; Ruth Cohen as Ruthie; Renee Fishman as Monk's Cafe Patron (uncredited)

Episode chronology
← Previous "The Invitations"	Next → "The Soul Mate"
- Seinfeld season 8

"The Foundation" is the 135th episode of the American television sitcom Seinfeld. This was the first episode of the eighth season, and as such was the first episode in which Jerry Seinfeld assumed command of the show following the departure of its co-creator, Larry David. It was originally broadcast on the NBC network on September 19, 1996.

In the episode, following the death of his fiancée Susan Ross at the end of the previous season, George finds himself tasked with being on the board of directors at a foundation dedicated to her memory. Meanwhile, Kramer inspires Elaine to take charge after J. Peterman abandons his company and runs off to Myanmar (Burma), and Jerry discovers that his and George's severed engagements make them more attractive to women.

== Plot ==
While George wishes to move on from his fiancée Susan's death, her parents want to keep her memory alive by creating a foundation in her honor, inspired by words of comfort Jerry told them while visiting Susan's grave. Interrupting George's celebration of his rediscovered bachelorhood, the Rosses ask him to sit on the board of directors. George is horrified at the prospect of all his free time being sacrificed to the foundation but uncomfortable with refusing.

In a last demonstration of their remarkable similarity, Jerry and Jeannie Steinman simultaneously voice a desire to break off their engagement. Dolores from "The Junior Mint" asks Jerry out on a coffee date; he realizes that her interest in him was renewed because she heard of his engagement, which proves his willingness to commit. However, she does not believe him when he tells her the breakup was mutual and storms out. Still intrigued by how the engagement earned him a date, Jerry makes up a questionnaire to determine how a man's relationship history affects his attractiveness to women.

After a nervous breakdown, J. Peterman runs off to Myanmar and leaves Elaine in charge of his catalog. Kramer convinces Elaine she can run the company by telling her how he became a dominating karate student. She impresses the employees with her commanding attitude and puts her idea for an "urban sombrero" on the cover. Jerry, having learned that Kramer's karate classmates are preadolescent children, suggests Elaine visit Kramer at his class, hoping to wreck her newfound confidence. When she sees that Kramer has only been fighting kids, she angrily shoves him down. Emboldened by this, the kids lure Kramer to an alley and beat him up in retaliation. Elaine hears that her urban sombrero diminishes the alertness of those who wear it, further ruining her confidence.

George is informed that Susan's parents planned to give him and Susan an opulent townhome and a considerable portion of their riches as wedding presents, but now he is stuck at the foundation as her possessions are auctioned off to benefit various charities. Jerry calls to inform him that widowers got the best responses on his research from employees at Monk's, but George's obligation to the foundation prevents him from acting on it.

== Production ==
Jerry Seinfeld took over the role of executive producer following the departure of Larry David beginning with this episode. As a result of his added duties with the show, his traditional stand-up comedy segments were scrapped. The episode was dedicated to Marjorie Gross, a writer for the show who died of ovarian cancer in June 1996.

The spinning shot of George yelling "Khan!" was accomplished with a device which consisted of a camera fitted inside a barrel and rotated with a crank. This upward-panning camera technique is repeated by George in "The Dealership" and by Elaine in "The Susie". One of the things being auctioned off at the foundation is Susan's doll collection, seen in "The Doll."

The episode's Kramer story was inspired by a college friend of writers Alec Berg and Jeff Schaffer. Their friend would often brag about how he was advancing in karate ranks, but they later learned he was in a class otherwise consisting of young children. The scene in which Kramer is beaten up by the children in an alley was shot as a callback to the "ribbon bullies" scene in Season 7's "The Sponge".

In a parallel of the episode's Elaine story arc, Jerry Seinfeld was not entirely happy with how the episode turned out, and experienced a loss of confidence that he could do the show without David. He would find his footing with running the show over subsequent episodes in the season.
