= The Blood (Seinfeld) =

- Seinfeld episode
- Episode no.: Season 9 Episode 4
- Directed by: Andy Ackerman
- Written by: Dan O'Keefe
- Production code: 904
- Original air date: October 16, 1997

Guest appearances
- Wayne Knight as Newman; Barney Martin as Morty Seinfeld; Liz Sheridan as Helen Seinfeld; Lloyd Bridges as Izzy Mandelbaum; Gene Dynarski as Izzy Mandelbaum Jr.; Kellie Waymire as Vivian; Colton James as Jimmy; Yvonne Farrow as Employee; Audrey Kissel as Tara; Ruth Cohen as Ruthie Cohen (uncredited)

Episode chronology
← Previous "The Serenity Now"	Next → "The Junk Mail"
- Seinfeld season 9

"The Blood" is the 160th episode of the NBC sitcom Seinfeld. This was the fourth episode for the ninth and final season. It aired on October 16, 1997. This was Lloyd Bridges's last television performance before his death. He reprised his role as Izzy Mandelbaum, who becomes Jerry's personal trainer in the episode. Other plotlines include George becoming obsessed with combining sex with food and TV and Kramer donating three pints of blood to save a mortally injured Jerry.

== Plot ==
Jerry feels he is getting out of shape and starts a purification program to improve his diet. His parents buy him sessions with a personal trainer, Izzy Mandelbaum. Meanwhile, Elaine is offended when her friend Vivian implies that Elaine is not responsible enough to babysit her son Jimmy and asks Kramer to babysit him. Elaine follows Kramer to Vivian's house, pushes him into the bushes and takes over. Jimmy turns out to be badly behaved, but wanting to thoroughly erase her irresponsible image, she tells Vivian she had no trouble. This prompts Vivian to have her babysit more often and even suggest that she will leave Jimmy in Elaine's care if her ongoing health problems flare up.

George decides to add food to his sex life after his girlfriend Tara's vanilla-scented incense makes him hungry. Although Tara is disgusted when he suggests integrating a pastrami sandwich into their lovemaking, he is so delighted at combining sex and food that he begins covertly eating food from the nightstand drawer during sex. However, when he starts to eat a sandwich and watch TV during a sexual encounter, she breaks up with him. By this point, George's carnal and culinary desires have become intertwined. Elaine brings George to Vivian's house to make up an excuse to get her out of taking care of Jimmy. When George finds Vivian shares his pastrami and TV fetish, they have sex on the kitchen floor. This leaves George saddled with babysitting Jimmy.

Kramer is upset at rising fees at the blood bank and stores his own blood at home. Jerry accidentally launches a knife into his own jugular, and Kramer donates three pints of his at-hand blood to save his life. Kramer guilt-trips Jerry into letting him and Newman make sausages in Jerry's kitchen. When Izzy sees the sausages, he thinks Jerry is eating unhealthily and confiscates them. Irate at this, Newman stops allowing Kramer to store blood in his refrigerator. Kramer takes it back to the blood bank, using Jerry's car since his own lacks working air conditioning. The car overheats, so Kramer puts some blood in the radiator. For a workout, Izzy ties Jerry to the car and makes him run behind it. The blood leaks onto the driver’s feet, causing him to panic and accelerate. Jerry is dragged down the street and requires another blood transfusion, this time from Newman.

== Production ==
The scenes in Jerry's car were filmed on September 22, 1997, while the scenes in Jerry's apartment and Monk's Cafe and the George/Tara sex scenes were all filmed live before a studio audience on September 24. Due to scheduling conflicts, guest actor Lloyd Bridges could not be present for the audience taping, so crew member Pete G. Papanickolas (who had previously played Don Tyler in "The Muffin Tops") acted as his stand-in during the taping.

Due to time constraints, both the opening and closing scenes were deleted before broadcast. The former featured Jerry sitting next to Newman in Monk's Cafe, and the latter saw Jerry unsuccessfully trying to get the blood bank to arrange a total blood transfusion for him in order to purge out the Newman blood. Other significant cuts included the resolution of the Jerry dieting subplot; following his blood transfusion from Kramer, Jerry orders a Reuben sandwich with extra cheese, and when Elaine questions what happened to his purification diet, he replies "That's oat bran compared to what I got inside of me."

The network considered running the episode as a Halloween special due to its dark subject matter, but ended up airing it two weeks earlier, on October 16, 1997.
