= Rachel Goldstein =

Rachel Goldstein may refer to:

- A fictional character in the television show Water Rats
- A fictional character in the television show Seinfeld, see List of Seinfeld characters § Other characters
