= The Wizard (Seinfeld) =

- Seinfeld episode
- Episode no.: Season 9 Episode 15
- Directed by: Andy Ackerman
- Written by: Steve Lookner
- Production code: 915
- Original air date: February 26, 1998

Guest appearances
- Barney Martin as Morty Seinfeld; Liz Sheridan as Helen Seinfeld; Grace Zabriskie as Mrs. Ross; Warren Frost as Mr. Ross; Mike McShane as FDR (uncredited); Samuel Bliss Cooper as Darryl; Edgar Small as Sid Luckman; Vic Helford as Tom; Bahni Turpin as Waitress #1; Constance Zimmer as Waitress #2; Jeanette Miller as Old Woman; Murray Rubin as Rubin; Ruth Cohen as Ruthie Cohen (uncredited)

Episode chronology
← Previous "The Strongbox"	Next → "The Burning"
- Seinfeld season 9

"The Wizard" is the 171st episode of the NBC sitcom Seinfeld. This was the 15th episode for the ninth and final season. It aired on February 26, 1998. In this episode, Kramer retires and moves into the same condo as Morty and Helen Seinfeld, Elaine tries to find out if her light-skinned boyfriend is actually black, and George gets upset that the Rosses will not call him a liar after they catch him lying about buying a house in the Hamptons.

== Plot ==
Jerry goes to Del Boca Vista and gives his dad Morty a $200 Wizard organizer for a birthday present, claiming he got it for $50. Jerry becomes frustrated that Morty only uses it as a tip calculator, disregarding its other functions.

Susan Ross's parents inform George that the Susan Ross Foundation is having an event. George makes the excuse that he has to close on buying a house in the Hamptons. The Rosses find out from Elaine that he has no such house, but when George later tells them more, they do not call him out. Elaine informs George that the Rosses knew he was lying. Outraged, he invites the Rosses to his house in the Hamptons to impel them to say he is lying. George drives the Rosses all the way to the tip of Long Island, but they continue to play along with the lie.

Kramer retires and moves to Del Boca Vista after a Hollywood studio purchases the movie rights to his coffee table book about coffee tables. An election is held for president of the condo association. Morty cannot run because he was impeached from The Pines of Mar Gables in "The Cadillac", so he persuades Kramer to run and let him dictate things from behind the scenes, like a puppet regime.

Jerry assumes that Elaine's racially ambiguous new boyfriend, Darryl, is black, while George thinks he is white. The matter is further obfuscated when Elaine learns he is from South Africa and Darryl jokingly lists his ethnicity as "Asian" on a warranty card for the Wizard Elaine buys him. The confusion is apparently settled when Darryl refers to himself and Elaine as an interracial couple. However, when Elaine boasts to a waitress that her boyfriend is black, he denies it. He says he referred to them as an interracial couple because he thought she was Hispanic. They glumly realize they are "just a couple of white people" and go to The Gap.

Kramer's campaign is threatened when Kramer is caught barefoot in the clubhouse—a scandalous violation of rules. Kramer suggests buying each of the condo board members a Wizard organizer; Bob Sacamano's father can get them cheap. However, the cheap organizers are Willards, a knockoff brand of poor quality. Outrage over the faulty organizers costs Kramer the election as Sid Luckman advises everyone to vote for the guy in the wheelchair; Kramer states that the people have spoken and he moves back to New York. When Jerry apologizes to his parents, Morty states that he should be sorry and asks how he can spend a lot of money on a tip calculator. Jerry once again states that it has other features.

During the credits, George finally caves upon arrival at the Hamptons and asks the Rosses why they did not stop him. The Rosses reveal they were being vindictive as they never liked him and they blame George for Susan's death. Mr. Ross then states that they should head back.

== Production ==
The Seinfeld writers had always planned an episode dealing with race. An initial idea had Elaine getting lost in Harlem, but the idea was abandoned when "they simply could not get the tone right". Sequences which were filmed for the episode but deleted before broadcast include Jerry meeting with Bob Sacamano's father and George explaining why he has not been at the Susan Ross Foundation since the season 8 episode "The Van Buren Boys": the foundation had spent all its assets.

George's line "Alright, you want to get nuts? Come on, let's get nuts!" was taken from the 1989 film Batman.

== Analysis ==
"The Wizard" satirises the discomfort of white Americans when discussing issues of race. Tim Delaney, in Seinology: The Sociology of Seinfeld, wrote that the episode "does a wonderful job of illustrating the delicate nature of discussing race, even when it's between friends, who assumingly, are not racist." Albert Auster, of Fordham University, wrote: "If the series did have one strong point in its dealings with race, it was with the embarrassment and uneasiness that middle-class whites often feel about the issue." Paul Arras, in his book Seinfeld: A Cultural History, described "The Wizard" as "a tongue-in-cheek acknowledgement of the show's lack of black characters, revealing how the pursuit of diversity can be disingenuous."
