= The Strongbox =

- Seinfeld episode
- Episode no.: Season 9 Episode 14
- Directed by: Andy Ackerman
- Story by: Dan O'Keefe & Billy Kimball
- Teleplay by: Dan O'Keefe
- Production code: 914
- Original air date: February 5, 1998

Guest appearances
- Illeana Douglas as Loretta; Alex Kapp Horner as Maura; Louis Mustillo as Phil; Mary Scheer as Ms. Smoth; Nicholas Walker as Glenn; Bonnie McNeil as Alison; Rosie Malek-Yonan as Wife; Ruth Cohen as Ruthie Cohen (uncredited); Jennifer Eolin as Woman in Cafe (uncredited); Doug Senior as Cook (uncredited)

Episode chronology
| ← Previous "The Cartoon" | Next → "The Wizard" |
- Seinfeld season 9

"The Strongbox" is the 170th episode of the NBC sitcom Seinfeld. This was the 14th episode for the ninth and final season. It aired on February 5, 1998. In this episode, George's girlfriend stubbornly refuses to accept his breaking up with her, Elaine dates a man who won't tell her his phone number or where he works, and Jerry develops an adversarial relationship with his neighbor Phil after he fails to recognize Phil when he asks to be let into their apartment building.

== Plot ==
George tries to break up with his girlfriend, Maura, but she will not agree to it. George decides that cheating on Maura is his ticket out. He starts dating a co-worker, Loretta, but she says she will not have sex with him until they've built up a relationship. George tries "accidentally" making dates with both women at Monk's at the same time, but both women agree to having a polyamorous relationship with George.

Jerry has purchased cufflinks worn by Jerry Lewis in Cinderfella. He plans to use them as a conversation starter with Lewis when he goes to a roast at the Friar's Club.

Elaine's new boyfriend Glenn puzzles and intrigues her because he will not tell her his phone number or where he works. On the street, he avoids a woman, and Elaine jumps to the conclusion that he is married. Glenn takes her to a squalid apartment which she assumes he has rented for the extramarital affair. However, the woman Glenn ran from knocks at the door and introduces herself as his welfare caseworker; the squalid apartment is his home. Elaine adjusts to Glenn being poor, but while at his apartment they are walked in on by another woman, who introduces herself as Glenn's wife.

With burglaries occurring in the building, Kramer obtains a strongbox to hold his valuables. He hides his key in Jerry's apartment, but keeps choosing places that Jerry uses every day, like his silverware drawer, his shirt pocket, and his intercom. This causes the intercom to short out, so Jerry has to go downstairs to let George in. A man, Phil, says he forgot his key and asks to be let in. Jerry denies him entry, explaining that there have been burglaries and he does not recognize him. Later Jerry bumps into Phil in the elevator, and learns he lives right next door to Kramer.

Giving up on Jerry's apartment, Kramer hides his key at Phil's, in his parrot's food dish. The parrot chokes on the key and dies. Since Kramer never told Phil about the key, Phil assumes Jerry poisoned the parrot as revenge for it making a mess on Jerry's door. Jerry needs his cufflinks for the roast, and Kramer has locked them in his strongbox, so Kramer and Jerry go to the pet cemetery to exhume the key. Phil catches Jerry while going to mourn. George asks what is in the strongbox and opens it up, making Kramer realize he forgot to lock it, so their attempted grave robbery was purposeless.

== Characters ==
- Maura (played by Alex Kapp Horner), George's girlfriend who will not let him break up with her.
- Phil (played by Louis Mustillo), Jerry and Kramer's neighbor who owns a large parrot.
- Loretta (played by Illeana Douglas), a secretary who has always had a crush on George and an inexplicable dark tan.
- Glenn (played by Nicholas Walker), Elaine's poor and unemployed but suave boyfriend.
- Ms. Smoth (played by Mary Scheer), Glenn's welfare caseworker.

== Production ==
The table read for the episode took place on January 17, 1998, at which time it was still under its original title, "The Buzzer". Filming went on all day on January 19, starting with the exterior shots, then the scenes in the hallway and elevator of Jerry and Kramer's apartment building, and finally the scenes in the pet cemetery. The remaining interior shots were filmed before a live studio audience on January 21.

Scenes which were filmed but deleted before broadcast due to time constraints include Jerry returning to his apartment to find Kramer has trashed it in search of a good hiding place for his strongbox key.

== Critical reception ==
David Sims of The A.V. Club writes that this is one of many episodes which contribute to a "decline of Elaine" story arc: "Everything about Elaine's behavior here is beautifully awful: She doesn't care if [Glenn is] married, but is eager to dump him once she realizes he's broke, and sets about bribing him into a breakup by outfitting his apartment so she won't feel so bad when she dumps him. Then, of course, as a final cosmic joke, it turns out he is married. Even George doesn't have luck this bad at this point." Sims adds that the dead parrot subplot is "abject farce".

Siyumhaseinfeld writes, "This funny episode doesn't make the Top 50, but it still has such greats as the scene of Jerry and George making fun of the Green Lantern and Lassie #3. Overall, nice ep... This 22 minute episode felt like it was about an hour and a half. Some parts were slow, other were slower, and then still some were slowest. But on that note, there were some funny parts, mainly to do with the key or the strongbox. That's the only thing that kept it from not being in the bottom Top 25." Paul Arras called The Strongbox

characteristic of Seinfeld's Late Period. Some of the episodes, especially the weaker ones, are so wild and scattered in their stories that they defy a simple description. That's not to say The Strongbox doesn't have its fair share of funny moments - they just don't come together as well as most classic Seinfeld episodes... The episode feels more like a bunch of distinct jokes cobbled together in the writer's room. Even when [it's] about nothing Seinfeld is best when it does a lot with that nothingness.

Vulture ranked the episode the 12th worst in the series, criticizing the dead parrot subplot as too dark even by the standards of Seinfeld.
