= The Cartoon =

- Seinfeld episode
- Episode no.: Season 9 Episode 13
- Directed by: Andy Ackerman
- Written by: Bruce Eric Kaplan
- Production code: 913
- Original air date: January 29, 1998

Guest appearances
- Wayne Knight as Newman; Kathy Griffin as Sally Weaver; John O'Hurley as J. Peterman; Paul Benedict as Mr. Elinoff; Tracy Nelson as Janet; Joe Urla as Dugan; Bart McCarthy as Cab Driver; Ruth Cohen as Ruthie Cohen (uncredited)

Episode chronology
← Previous "The Reverse Peephole"	Next → "The Strongbox"
- Seinfeld season 9

"The Cartoon" is the 169th episode of the NBC sitcom Seinfeld. This was the 13th episode for the ninth and final season. It aired on January 29, 1998. In this episode, aspiring actress Sally Weaver becomes a success with a show where she vilifies Jerry, Elaine struggles to see the humor in a cartoon that appears in The New Yorker, and George is disconcerted when Elaine and Kramer point out that the woman he is dating looks a lot like Jerry.

== Plot ==
Kramer reveals Jerry's low opinion of Sally Weaver's acting directly to her when they meet on the street. After Sally claims that Jerry has ruined her life and she is quitting show business, Jerry is driven by guilt to recant his comments and encourage her to keep trying. Revitalized, Sally opens a new one-woman show called "Jerry Seinfeld, the Devil" where she complains about him, comically exaggerating his earlier criticism. The show is an instant success, consistently playing to sold-out crowds and appearing in TV clips. In private she is apologetic to Jerry, but in public she uses his petitions and legal maneuvers for her to stop as fresh material for her show. Jerry eventually wises up and cuts off all communication with Sally.

Elaine obsesses over the meaning of a cartoon that appears in The New Yorker. Elaine goes to The New Yorker offices to seek an explanation, but the editor does not understand the cartoon either. Elaine rails against the New Yorker's nonsensical cartoons; impressed, the editor hires her. She gets a cartoon published easily, but is frustrated that none of her friends or co-workers find her first New Yorker cartoon funny. Her boss J. Peterman sees it, and recognizes that it plagiarizes a Ziggy comic. Elaine supposes that she copied it subconsciously. Peterman publicizes the plagiarism, and a new Ziggy strip parodies Elaine's cartoon.

George begins dating a woman named Janet who Kramer believes closely resembles a female version of Jerry. Elaine agrees with Kramer, making George and Jerry uncomfortable, particularly after Kramer suggests that George is dating Janet because he has a repressed crush on Jerry. After Jerry rebukes Kramer for talking openly about such sensitive subjects, Kramer decides to stop talking and communicate nonverbally. George clings to vague memories of his first conversation with Janet, but she reminds him that the conversation was largely about how familiar she looks. She gets gum in her hair and cuts her hair short to get it out, making her hair look exactly like Jerry's. Terrified, George flees.

Sally runs into Kramer at Monk's and is happy about her new celebrity. Frustrated from being unable to voice his opinions on the recent developments in his friends' lives, Kramer breaks his vow of silence and tells her about Janet. Sally adds a bit on her show about Jerry forcing his friend to date women who look like him. Kramer renews his vow of silence.

== Background ==
The episode was inspired by comedian Kathy Griffin's ridiculing Jerry Seinfeld during a stand-up comedy performance on HBO's HBO Comedy Half-Hour (airing October 18, 1996) where she stated that he was rude to her during her first appearance on the sitcom, in the episode "The Doll". Seinfeld was so amused by this that he wrote her a humorous letter congratulating her for it (reprinted in her memoir, Official Book Club Selection), added the clip of her routine as well as a clip of her being interviewed about the incident by Conan O'Brien to a video shown to audiences at Seinfeld tapings, and had it written into the series. Griffin said, given that this was one of the final ten episodes of Seinfeld, "I felt like it was part of history-making television."

The episode's writer, Bruce Eric Kaplan, had himself contributed many cartoons to The New Yorker, and he drew upon some of his own experiences for this part of the plot. Kaplan said of the cartoon subplot, "To me, the most interesting part of that story was the idea of not understanding a cartoon. ... Just because I’m a New Yorker cartoonist, that story actually wasn’t as personal as it may appear."

== Production ==
The table read for the episode was held on January 8, 1998. The scenes in the Peterman office and theater were filmed on January 12, followed by the exterior scenes on January 13, and finally the live audience taping of the scenes in Jerry's apartment and Monk's cafe on January 14.

The filming ran well over the allotted time for the episode, surpassing 32 minutes, necessitating that some scenes be cut entirely in addition to the usual editing. During filming, the writers came up with a new closing line for a scene where Elaine argues with a co-worker who says he understands the "e-mail" cartoon in The New Yorker, which earned a big laugh from the studio audience. However, the scene ended up being among those cut to get the episode down to the correct running time. Other cuts included most of the scenes of Kramer maintaining his vow of silence.

Newman praising "Jerry Seinfeld Is the Devil" as "a show that's about something" is a self-deprecating reference to the popular description of Seinfeld as "a show about nothing."

== The New Yorker tribute ==
On July 18, 2012, The New Yorker paid tribute to the episode. Contest #342 was a drawing of a pig at a complaint window. The winning caption was printed in the next August 27, 2012 issue of the magazine and read "Stop sending me spam!" It was submitted by Sean Lynch of Brooklyn, NY.

== Reception ==
Vance Durgin of the Orange County Register wrote that the episode was "funny all the way, because of writing mostly true to the characters." Barbara Vancheri of the Pittsburgh Post-Gazette gave the episode a "7.5" on a ten-point scale.
