= The Apology (Seinfeld) =

- Seinfeld episode
- Episode no.: Season 9 Episode 9
- Directed by: Andy Ackerman
- Written by: Jennifer Crittenden
- Production code: 909
- Original air date: December 11, 1997

Guest appearances
- James Spader as Jason 'Stanky' Hanke; John O'Hurley as J. Peterman; Patrick Warburton as David Puddy; Brian Levinson as Andy; Michael Fishman as Gregg; Jack Hallett as Alan; Megan Cole as Peggy; Kathleen McClellan as Melissa; David Dunard as Leader; Wayne Wilderson as Walter; Eric Simonson as Friend; Ruth Cohen as Ruthie Cohen (uncredited); Randy Carter as Elaine's Co-Worker (uncredited); Dave Richardson as Hanke's Friend (uncredited)

Episode chronology
| ← Previous "The Betrayal" | Next → "The Strike" |
- Seinfeld season 9

"The Apology" is the 165th episode of the NBC sitcom Seinfeld. This was the ninth episode for the ninth and final season. It first aired on December 11, 1997. In this episode, Jerry learns his girlfriend is a nudist, George tries to get an apology out of his old friend Jason Hanke (played by James Spader) through Hanke's participation in Alcoholics Anonymous's twelve-step program, Elaine is dealing with germs, and Kramer gives up on keeping his showers short, opting to instead spend all day in the shower.

== Plot ==
Jerry is dating Melissa, a woman who is comfortable being naked in his apartment in nonsexual contexts. While initially amused by Melissa's quirk, he finds that certain commonplace actions, such as coughing and squatting, make her nudity repulsive. Jerry plans to make Melissa understand his revulsion by using a belt sander while naked, but Melissa objects to his nudity before he even turns on the sander. Jerry convinces Melissa to wear clothes more often, but Jerry and Melissa now cannot stop picturing each other naked, straining their relationship.

George learns that his childhood friend Jason Hanke is a recovering alcoholic and, as Step 9 of Alcoholics Anonymous's Twelve Steps, is apologizing for all his misdeeds. George gets angry when Jason moves on to Step 10 without apologizing for embarrassing him at a party a few years earlier. George asked to borrow his sweater, and Jason refused, saying the neck would be stretched out, which made everyone else laugh. When George broaches the subject, Jason refuses to apologize, saying that his concern about his sweater was sincere. George petitions Jason's sponsor to intervene; his anger over the old embarrassment instead convinces the sponsor to enroll George in an anger management class. Jason goes to the anger management class after snapping at George and some teenagers at his job at an ice cream shop. He and George have another confrontation at the meeting.

After Jerry informs Kramer that his hour-long showers are not normal, Kramer attempts to reduce his time showering. He cuts it down to a half-hour, but only by not rinsing off the lather or drying off. Jerry gives him some pointers on more efficient showering, but refuses his request for a personal demonstration, and when Kramer tries observing in a public shower he is mistaken for a voyeur, given a black eye, and ejected. Frustrated at these failures, he decides that since he enjoys showers so much, he should go the other direction and spend all his time showering. He buys a waterproof phone, and installs a garbage disposal in his bathtub drain so that he can prepare meals in the shower.

Elaine notices her co-worker Peggy puts sanitary paper on a toilet only used by the two of them, yet she is clearly not a germophobe because she finishes off another co-worker's half-drunk water bottle. When Elaine confronts her about this, she says Elaine disgusts her because she is sexually promiscuous. Insulted, Elaine rubs Peggy's keyboard on her buttocks and her stapler under her armpit, and coughs on her doorknob. Peggy calls in sick the next day, but Elaine insists her illness must be psychosomatic. David Puddy agrees, and accompanies Elaine to Peggy's to convince her to come back to work. He reveals to Peggy that he is a recovering germophobe and persuades her that she is one too.

Elaine makes up with Peggy by inviting her over for a dinner cooked by Kramer. When Kramer reveals that he prepared the dinner while showering, they are all horrified. David has to go back to Germophobes Anonymous, with Peggy and Elaine now joining him.

== Production ==
James Spader was invited to fill the role of Jason Hanke by Seinfeld co-creator/star Jerry Seinfeld, who was a friend of Spader's. Jason Alexander had worked with Spader previously in the 1990 film White Palace.

The table read for the episode was held on November 8, 1997. Most scenes were filmed in front of a live studio audience on November 12, but the scenes in which Melissa is nude were filmed without an audience on November 10. This was for the sake of propriety, though Melissa actress Kathleen McClellan was not actually naked at any time during the filming.

== Critical reception ==
In a 2012 retrospective review, David Sims of The A.V. Club praised David Puddy's scenes, as well as Kramer's live-in shower and how it ultimately ties in to the Elaine story. He also said Megan Cole "is very good at looking freaked-out by Elaine". He was less enthusiastic about the George and Jerry stories, saying that while James Spader is perfectly cast and the stories had good premises, he did not like the directions they went in.

Social science writer Eric Horowitz cited the situation between George and Jason as "a fairly accurate representation" of how a person's desire for an apology stems from feeling angry and wanting assurance the transgression will not happen again, and of how perpetrators want to make an apology when they regret the action. Because Jason does not regret what he did to George, he sees no reason to apologize, and this same lack of regret is what makes George want the apology all the more.
