= The Serenity Now =

- Seinfeld episode
- Episode no.: Season 9 Episode 3
- Directed by: Andy Ackerman
- Written by: Steve Koren
- Production code: 903
- Original air date: October 9, 1997

Guest appearances
- Jerry Stiller as Frank Costanza; Estelle Harris as Estelle Costanza; Lori Loughlin as Patty; Matt McCoy as Lloyd Braun; Richard Fancy as Lippman; Ross Malinger as Adam Lippman; Bruce Mahler as Rabbi Glickman; Ruth Cohen as Ruthie Cohen (uncredited)

Episode chronology
| ← Previous "The Voice" | Next → "The Blood" |
- Seinfeld season 9

"The Serenity Now" is the 159th episode of the American sitcom Seinfeld. This was the third episode of the ninth and final season. It aired on NBC in the United States on October 9, 1997. In this episode, George competes with his childhood rival Lloyd Braun at selling computers for his father Frank, and Elaine finds herself being forcibly kissed or hit on by every Jewish male she knows, including Jerry, who is experiencing emotions for the first time.

== Plot ==
An instructional tape advises Frank Costanza to say "serenity now" every time he gets angry in order to keep his blood pressure down. Frank hires his son George and George's childhood rival, Lloyd Braun, as computer telemarketers. George is so determined to sell more than Lloyd, he purchases numerous computers and stores them in Kramer's apartment, planning to get refunds after. Lloyd is fired when George appears to outsell him. Before he leaves, Lloyd warns George the "serenity now" mantra is actually harmful, as it bottles up emotions.

Jerry's girlfriend Patty observes that he never gets angry, and concludes he is repressing his emotions. At her continued goading, Jerry expresses real anger for the first time. Uplifted by the release of emotion, Jerry begins expressing anger all the time, driving Patty to break up with him. He begins experiencing other newfound emotions; he cries over Patty leaving him, tells George and Kramer he loves them, and asks Elaine to marry him.

Elaine goes to the bar mitzvah of her ex-boss Mr. Lippman's son Adam. Adam celebrates by giving her a French kiss. Word gets around, and she is invited to six more bar mitzvahs. When she tells Adam the kiss was inappropriate, he bitterly renounces Judaism, and Mr. Lippman French kisses her. George tells Elaine that it's because Jewish men are attracted to non-Jewish women, a concept called shiksappeal. She is skeptical at first, but after Jerry's proposal Elaine consults Rabbi Glickman for advice on how to eliminate her shiksappeal. He comes on to her as well.

Kramer is inspired to turn the hallway area outside his apartment door to resemble a front porch in "Anytown, USA", with lawn chairs, potted plants, American flag, wind chimes, and screen door. This draws vandalism from kids. He uses Frank's "serenity now" mantra but eventually his pent-up anger releases and he takes it out by smashing all of George's computers. When George suggests that Lloyd's sales should offset this financial disaster, Frank reveals that he never even plugged in the phone Lloyd made sales calls on; he apparently just played along with Lloyd's delusional "sales" so George would have someone to compete against.

To ease George's resulting despondency, Jerry urges him to confess all his emotions, which disturb Jerry so much he becomes emotionally repressed again. Elaine accepts Jerry's proposal, but he is no longer interested. Frank and Estelle fight over his use of the garage as an office. At George's suggestion, Frank uses a new relaxation phrase "Hoochie Mama" when an angry Estelle tries to park in the garage.

== Production ==
While driving with his arguing parents, writer Steve Koren was bewildered to hear his father shout "Serenity now!" at the top of his lungs as part of a rage controlling exercise he had heard about from an audio tape, and questioned whether the phrase was meant to be yelled. He ended up basing many of the episode's George scenes on conversations with his parents.

Most scenes in the episode were filmed before a studio audience on September 10, 1997.

As typical for a Seinfeld episode, a number of scenes were cut to get the episode to fit into its time slot, including a scene in the Costanza garage which parodied the "always be closing" scene from Glengarry Glen Ross. Some of the other cuts were Frank giving George a can of motor oil and a funnel in lieu of the Water Pik which he failed to wrestle away from Estelle, Jerry calling Patty after their breakup and apologizing for serenading her with "I Want to Know What Love Is", and Jerry suggesting to Elaine that she go with David Puddy to the bar mitzvah, reasoning that by that time they will have gotten back together after their latest breakup. Additionally, in the first draft Elaine is more frank with Jerry when accepting his marriage proposal, saying that she needs to take herself off the market to escape the nightmare of her "shiksappeal" and regards Jerry as slightly better than dying alone.
