= The Yada Yada =

- Seinfeld episode
- Episode no.: Season 8 Episode 19
- Directed by: Andy Ackerman
- Written by: Peter Mehlman & Jill Franklyn
- Production code: 819
- Original air date: April 24, 1997

Guest appearances
- Bryan Cranston as Tim Whatley; Suzanne Cryer as Marcy; Jill St. John as Mrs. Abbott; Robert Wagner as Dr. Abbott; Stephen Caffrey as Arnie; Debra Messing as Beth; Danny Woodburn as Mickey; Henry Woronicz as Father Curtis; Monica Lacy as Julie; Ali Marsh as Karen; David Chandler as Brian; Virginia Watson as Nun; Walter Franks as Waiter; Jerry Maren as Dad

Episode chronology
← Previous "The Nap"	Next → "The Millennium"
- Seinfeld season 8

"The Yada Yada" is the 153rd episode of the American NBC sitcom Seinfeld. The 19th episode of the eighth season, it aired on April 24, 1997. Peter Mehlman and Jill Franklyn were nominated for an Emmy for Outstanding Writing in a Comedy Series in 1997.

== Plot ==
Jerry's dentist, Tim Whatley, has just converted to Judaism and is already making Jewish-themed jokes. Jerry, who is Jewish, tells a priest that he thinks Tim only converted for the jokes, and that Tim has also been telling Catholic-themed jokes, saying that he's offended not as a Jew, but as a comedian. However, the priest is unamused by a dentist joke that Jerry makes at the end of their conversation and tells Tim. Tim takes extreme exception to the dentist joke and deliberately prolongs an uncomfortable procedure. After hearing Jerry's complaints about Tim, Kramer calls Jerry a "rabid anti-dentite".

Kramer and Mickey Abbott double date, but can't decide which woman, Karen or Julie, is right for which one of them. Kramer decides on Karen, but changes his mind after meeting Karen's parents, who are revealed to be little people like Mickey.

George's new girlfriend Marcy likes to say "yada yada yada" to shorten her stories. He uses this practice to avoid mentioning Susan's death. Marcy tells him that her ex-boyfriend had visited her the night before "and yada yada yada, I'm really tired today." George consults Jerry and Elaine, suspecting that Marcy used "yada yada" to cover up sex with her ex-boyfriend. Later, George asks Marcy to tell him some of the things she was covering up with "yada yada", and discovers that she's a shoplifter.

Elaine is a character reference for Beth and Arnie, a couple who are trying to adopt. When she mentions Arnie's bad temper in the interview, the couple are rejected for adoption. Arnie pries the truth out of Elaine, but is afraid to tell Beth that he is responsible for their not getting a child. He uses "yada yada" to cover up the details of his meeting with Elaine, unwittingly making Beth think he cheated on her with Elaine. Elaine lobbies on behalf of Beth and Arnie, and sexually propositions the adoption official as an inducement. Beth's marriage fails and she accompanies Jerry to Mickey's wedding to Karen. Elaine, now dating the adoption agent, is dismayed and disgusted. George shows up without Marcy, who was arrested for stealing shoes. Julie runs out, apparently in love with Mickey and unable to bear seeing him marry Karen. Mickey's dad, a dentist, chastises Jerry for antagonizing Tim. Jerry is comforted by Beth, who harbors the same anti-dentite feelings towards dentists as he does, but also reveals she is racist and antisemitic. As Karen and Mickey walk out at the end of the ceremony, Karen says to Kramer, "I really wanted you."

== Production ==
The episode's co-writer, Peter Mehlman, got the inspiration for the episode's Jerry story when an old friend of his made a Jewish joke. Mehlman felt momentarily offended, but then remembered that his friend had converted to Judaism 20 years before, and started to wonder if it had taken that long for his friend to feel comfortable making Jewish jokes. This led him to contemplate the notion of someone making Jewish jokes almost immediately after converting. Though in previous episodes Dr. Tim Whatley had a thick head of hair, actor Bryan Cranston had shaved his head to play an astronaut in the movie That Thing You Do! and his hair had not yet grown back.

In an illustration of how much higher Seinfeld's budget was in its later seasons, the set with the urinals was constructed solely for this episode's cold open.

The scene where George consults his friends about the possibility of Marcy having sex with her ex-boyfriend took a number of takes, since Jerry Seinfeld kept breaking into laughter at Elaine actress Julia Louis-Dreyfus's delivery of the line "No, I mentioned the bisque."

The episode was allowed by NBC to run longer than the usual 23 minutes, and its slightly above-average length was even boasted about in promos. An edited version airs in syndication, cutting out several small scenes and dialogues, but the full-length version was released on the Seinfeld Season 8 DVD collection and streamed on Hulu and later Netflix.

=== "Yada yada yada" ===
The episode is one of the most famous of the series, specifically for its focus on the phrase "yada yada yada". "Yadda yadda" was already a common phrase before the episode aired, used notably by comedian Lenny Bruce, among others. The phrase may have originated with the 1950s song "Yakety Yak", 1940s vaudeville, or earlier. Seinfeld director Andy Ackerman remarked that while filming the episode he was struck by the fact that "yadda yadda" hadn't been the subject of a sitcom episode before, since it was such a universal everyday expression.

The Paley Center named "Yada Yada Yada" the No. 1 funniest phrase on "TV's 50 Funniest Phrases".

Before the episode aired, writer Peter Mehlman suspected that it would spawn a new Seinfeld catchphrase, but he thought it would be the phrase "anti-dentite" that would become popular.
