= The Summer of George =

- Seinfeld episode
- Episode no.: Season 8 Episode 22
- Directed by: Andy Ackerman
- Written by: Alec Berg & Jeff Schaffer
- Production code: 822
- Original air date: May 15, 1997

Guest appearances
- Molly Shannon as Sam; Raquel Welch as herself; Amanda Peet as Lanette; Joe Urla as Dugan; Victor Raider-Wexler as Doctor; Peter Dennis as Lew; Tucker Smallwood as Malcolm; Wayne Wilderson as Walter; Blake Gibbons as Lyle; Adrian Sparks as Man; Jane A. Johnston as Woman; Lauren Bowles as Waitress; Sue Goodman as Clerk; Neil Flynn as Cop #1; Tom Bailey as Cop #2; Denise Bessette as Therapist; David Mandel as himself

Episode chronology
← Previous "The Muffin Tops"	Next → "The Butter Shave"
- Seinfeld season 8

"The Summer of George" is the 156th episode of the sitcom Seinfeld. It was also the 22nd and final episode of the eighth season. It originally aired on May 15, 1997, on NBC. In this episode, after being fired from the New York Yankees, George wallows in idleness, while assisting Jerry with a girlfriend who is too much work for him to handle by himself. Meanwhile, Elaine is menaced by an unstable, violent woman who does not swing her arms when she walks, but everyone else dismisses the matter as a catfight.

== Plot ==
George gets a severance package from the New York Yankees that equals three months' pay, so he decides to treat it as three months off. He never changes out of his pajamas or leaves his apartment, asking his friends to visit him and calling Jerry on the phone to learn what is going on. Elaine's coworker, Sam, talks to Elaine about how she isn't fitting in at work. Elaine explains to Sam that she is the subject of office ridicule because she walks without moving her arms. In a rage, Sam trashes Elaine's office and leaves her threatening phone messages. J. Peterman and the police excitedly say that she's now involved in a catfight, and refuse to help.

Jerry and Kramer go to the Tony Awards: Jerry as an invited guest, Kramer as a seat filler. Jerry picks up his date to the Tonys, a waitress named Lanette, only to find a man named Lyle living in her apartment. While Kramer fills a seat for a nominee who has stepped away, he accidentally receives a Tony Award for the musical Scarsdale Surprise, starring Raquel Welch. While Kramer is using his Tony to mingle with stars, the producers of Scarsdale Surprise confront him, and say he can only keep his Tony if he fires Raquel Welch. Like Sam, she doesn't swing her arms when she moves, but they are afraid to fire Raquel directly because of her temper. Kramer fires her and she responds by attacking him, destroying his Tony. Walking down the street afterwards, Raquel sees Elaine describing Sam's walk to police; thinking Elaine is mocking her, Raquel attacks her, too.

Under pressure from Jerry, Lanette breaks up with Lyle, but she begins to wear Jerry out with her busy lifestyle. George suggests they team up, with George acting as Jerry's "dating intern". When Lanette needs invitations to a party, George picks them up, but on the way back to his apartment he stops to play frisbee golf. At his apartment, an invitation falls out and lands on the stairs. George slips on the invitation and falls, sending him to the hospital. The doctor, who is the same doctor who informed George of Susan's death, tells George his legs were in a state of atrophy because of his inactivity, and due to the resulting trauma he may only walk again with enough hard work and perseverance. The others respond with the same apathy as they did to Susan's death. In a post-credits scene, George seems to be recovering as he participates in physiotherapy, while Sam struggles to swing her arms as she walks.

== Production ==
The episode was written under the working title "The Dude", then renamed as the George story ended up taking greater prominence in the episode. The Jerry/Lanette/Lyle story was based on the time the episode's co-writer, Alec Berg, invited an actress who had appeared in one episode of Seinfeld to come with him to the Oscars. (Berg declined to identify the actress, but said the episode she appeared in was "The Calzone".) When Berg came to pick her up, he found a man in the apartment, with whom she shared what he described as "more than a peck, but not quite a smooch."

The character Sam was inspired by a high school classmate of the episode's other co-writer Jeff Schaffer, Sonya Chada, who didn't swing her arms when she walked. Schaffer said that none of Chada's classmates noticed this until one day, while Chada was carrying a beaker across the room, their chemistry teacher, Mr. Horgen, exploded, "For God's sake, Sonya, swing your arms!" Molly Shannon accidentally slashed her arm in the first take of the rampage in Elaine's office, but insisted on proceeding with several more takes.

The callback to "The Muffin Tops" was not in the episode's script. Rather, when Jerry Seinfeld came onto the set in a towel, the crew noticed that his chest hair had not fully regrown from when he shaved it for "The Muffin Tops", and decided to work this into the episode.

Though guest star Raquel Welch had a reputation as being difficult to work with, as the episode itself parodies, the Seinfeld cast and crew said they encountered no problems with her and that she seemed happy to be a part of the show. The fight between Raquel Welch and Elaine was filmed, but during the editing stage it was decided that it was funnier to have the fight entirely off-camera.
