= The Pie =

- Seinfeld episode
- Episode no.: Season 5 Episode 15
- Directed by: Tom Cherones
- Written by: Tom Gammill & Max Pross
- Production code: 515
- Original air date: February 17, 1994

Guest appearances
- Suzanne Snyder as Audrey; Christine Dunford as Saleswoman/Natasha; Reni Santoni as Poppie; Lane Davies as MacKenzie; Mark Beltzman as Bob; Sunday Theodore as Olive; Sam Lloyd as Ricky; Paul Mantee as Health Inspector; Patricia Belcher as Woman #1; Pamela Mant as Woman #2; Bernard Hocke as Guy in Diner

Episode chronology
← Previous "The Marine Biologist"	Next → "The Stand In"
- Seinfeld season 5

"The Pie" is the 79th episode of the NBC sitcom Seinfeld. This was the 15th episode for the fifth season. It aired on February 17, 1994. In this episode, Jerry needs to know why his girlfriend refused to try some apple pie; Elaine searches for the creator of a store mannequin with her own face; George and another man contend to buy the same suit on sale; and Kramer starts seeing a long-nailed woman to get his back scratched.

== Plot ==
After dinner at Monk's, Audrey passes up trying Jerry's apple pie, and starts tensely shaking her head when he insists. Jerry is perplexed that she gave no reason for refusing, despite having a sweet tooth.

Kramer sends Elaine to a downtown store to see a mannequin that looks exactly like her, and George, needing a suit for a job interview, goes along. Elaine demands to know where the uncanny mannequin came from, but a haughty saleswoman does not take her seriously. The saleswoman sells George on a perfectly-fitting suit, the last one in stock, and tips him off to come back later to get it on sale.

Kramer is plagued by a chronic back itch, and takes Jerry's spatula as a backscratcher. At Monk's, he finds blissful relief at the hands of Olive, a cashier with long nails.

George stands guard over the suit, clashing with another short, bald man who also wants it on sale. George ends up seeing the "Elaine" mannequin get undressed. On sale day, both men arrive before the store opens; having hid the suit beforehand, George claims his prize and gloats.

At "Poppie's", Audrey's father's restaurant, Jerry cannot let Audrey's pie refusal go, to her irritation. In the men's room, Poppie promises to personally cook for Jerry, but does not wash his hands after using the toilet. After watching Poppie knead pizza dough in horror, Jerry tensely shakes his head in refusal when the pizza is served, but cannot bear to tell Audrey why. Audrey assumes Jerry is getting back at her.

Elaine gets recognized in public from the store mannequin, and returns to find it dressed in lingerie, and posed getting an erotic spanking from a male mannequin. Elaine threatens to sue, distracting the saleswoman long enough to abscond with the mannequin in Jerry's car.

George goes to his interview at a restaurant, but his new suit pant legs rub together noisily. He is terrified because he heard the company fired someone for less, but the interviewers reassure him that it was for failing to toe the line. When a pie is served for dessert, George spots the chef, who turns out to be the man from the store, watching. George tensely shakes his head as the interviewers peer pressure him to eat. He loses the job for his dissent, but avoids the chef's tainted pie while the interviewers all get sick.

Jerry finds out that Audrey had apple pie at Monk's by herself, and confronts her again at Poppie's. A public health inspector arrests Poppie for sanitation violations, allowing Jerry to be smug.

Having stopped itching, Kramer also stops seeing Olive but needs an excuse to "let her down easy". With the lingerie-clad mannequin still in Jerry's car, Kramer gets in and fakes an impromptu makeout session with "Elaine", to Olive's confusion. Jerry never finds out why Audrey refused the pie, and Elaine's search for the mannequin creator hits a dead end even as "Elaines" appear in stores nationwide. Unbeknownst to Elaine, Ricky the TV Guide fan created them in tribute to her.

== Production ==
Though the cast reading took place on January 13, 1994, Julia Louis-Dreyfus' birthday, the filming of this episode did not take place until February due to the 1994 Northridge earthquake. Though the show's production staff considered moving from CBS Studio Center to Paramount Studios, CBS's stage crew spent three weeks renovating the stage before it was put back into use as CBS considered Seinfeld one of its best tenants. As an additional incentive to come back, CBS planned on renovating its New York Street backlot, which did not see its appearance until season six.

Tom Gammill once witnessed a chef leave a restaurant restroom without washing his hands after using the toilet, providing the basis for Poppie's story. Gammill and his writing partner Max Pross named Poppie as a setup for the climactic joke, "Poppie's hands are poopy," which was ultimately replaced with "Poppie's a little sloppy." The incident with the pie was based on a real-life incident as told to the writers by Seinfeld himself. They were struck by how the normally easygoing Seinfeld was so upset over such a trivial incident.

The character Olive was based on a cashier at the House of Pies.
