= The Wait Out =

- Seinfeld episode
- Episode no.: Season 7 Episode 23
- Directed by: Andy Ackerman
- Story by: Peter Mehlman & Matt Selman
- Teleplay by: Peter Mehlman
- Production code: 723
- Original air date: May 9, 1996

Guest appearances
- Heidi Swedberg as Susan Ross; Cary Elwes as David; Debra Messing as Beth; Danny Woodburn as Mickey; Allan Havey as Policeman; Diana Castle as Mrs. Zanfino; Todd Bosley as Joey Zanfino; Nicole Tocantins as Barbara

Episode chronology
← Previous "The Bottle Deposit"	Next → "The Invitations"
- Seinfeld season 7

"The Wait Out" is the 133rd episode of the NBC sitcom Seinfeld. This is the 23rd episode for the seventh season, originally airing on May 9, 1996. In this episode, George accidentally brings to fruition the long-awaited breakup of a married couple, letting Jerry and Elaine swoop in; and Kramer stubbornly wears jeans that are too tight.

== Plot ==
For years, Elaine and Jerry have been "waiting out" the marriage of David and Beth Lukner, each poised to move in on one of the couple as soon as they break up. George, meeting the Lukners, jokes that Beth is out of David's league, unknowingly making their simmering marital tension boil over into divorce. Elaine and Jerry opportunistically position themselves to comfort David and Beth, respectively, in their time of need. Elaine, borrowing a friend's car, is fired up to be driving for the first time in ages, making Jerry carsick with her turbulent motoring.

Jerry doubts that Kramer can sport a pair of jeans like he used to; taking this as a challenge, Kramer forces himself into jeans so tight that he cannot bend his knees. However, for Mickey Abbott's audition to join Actors Studio, Kramer must play a suspect under interrogation. Unable to pry the jeans off in time, Kramer cannot get into costume or sit down according to script, and flails around on stage until Mickey tackles him in a rage. Luckily, this ferocity passes him the audition.

Learning that he broke up the Lukners, George remorsefully runs off to "undo" his handiwork. He physically fights off Jerry and Elaine, and gets Beth to have second thoughts. With the nebbish David already bending to her will, Elaine demands Jerry pull his weight, forcibly driving Jerry to Beth for bonding time. Holding back his nausea, Jerry cannot express any emotion, confusing Beth. Meanwhile, David meets Susan and tells her that she is out of George's league. When Susan starts brooding, George is delighted that David's revenge might break up him and Susan.

Kramer doggedly keeps "breaking in" the jeans. He helps a neighbor watch her sleeping son Joey, but, seeing Kramer stiffly lurching like Frankenstein's monster, Joey runs away in terror. Kramer gets Mickey to lie under Joey's covers while he gives chase, but Mickey gets himself caught while Kramer gets arrested as a child predator. Under interrogation, Kramer once again cannot compliantly sit down.

All of Elaine's charms come to naught when Beth wins David back instantly. George starts preemptively moving out, only to find that Susan was brooding over wedding minutiae.

== Production ==
Michael Richards hurt his back during the scene in which Jerry attempts to pull Kramer's jeans off.

== Awards and nominations ==
At the 48th Primetime Emmy Awards, Julia Louis-Dreyfus won the Primetime Emmy Award for Outstanding Supporting Actress in a Comedy Series for her role in this episode.
