= The Muffin Tops =

- Seinfeld episode
- Episode no.: Season 8 Episode 21
- Directed by: Andy Ackerman
- Written by: Spike Feresten
- Production code: 821
- Original air date: May 8, 1997

Guest appearances
- Wayne Knight as Newman; Reuven Bar-Yotam as Foreign Guy; Rena Sofer as Mary Anne; Melinda Clarke as Alex; Richard Fancy as Mr. Lippman; Sonya Eddy as Rebecca DeMornay; John O'Hurley as Jacopo "J." Peterman; Lee Bear as George Steinbrenner (uncredited); Larry David as George Steinbrenner (voice, uncredited)

Episode chronology
← Previous "The Millennium"	Next → "The Summer of George"
- Seinfeld season 8

"The Muffin Tops" is the 155th episode of the sitcom Seinfeld. This was the 21st episode of the eighth season. It aired on May 8, 1997, on NBC. In this episode, George dates a woman while pretending to be a tourist from Little Rock, Arkansas, Kramer starts running a "Peterman Reality Tour" after finding out he is the basis for most of the stories in J. Peterman's autobiography, and Elaine and Mr. Lippman run a business selling only the tops of muffins.

== Plot ==
A tourist asks George to watch his luggage. When the tourist does not return, George starts wearing clothing from the bag while examining a map, and is mistaken for a tourist by Mary Anne, who works for the New York Visitor Center. George pretends he is visiting from Little Rock, Arkansas, where he works for Tyler Chicken, so that she will be responsible for making date plans. Mary Anne tells George she does not want a relationship, since he is leaving soon. He suggests he might move to New York; she replies that the city would eat him alive. George sets out to prove her wrong by showing her his "new" apartment and New York Yankees office. Mary Anne mentions George's job with Tyler Chicken to Steinbrenner. Steinbrenner phones the CEO of Tyler Chicken to say he is unwilling to share George. Tyler does not know who George is, but reasons that he must be important for Steinbrenner to call, so he offers to convert all Yankees concessions to chicken, free of charge, in exchange for George working exclusively at Tyler Chicken.

The tourist runs into George at a bar. He makes George return his clothing, leaving him in his boxers. Mary Ann finds George using the bathroom phone to call Jerry, asking him to get him some clothes, and comments that she told him New York would eat him alive.

While eating the top off a muffin at J. Peterman's book signing, Elaine tells Mr. Lippman, who is publishing the book, that someone should open a store selling just the tops, and eventually Lippman starts a business called "Top of the Muffin to You!". When the business starts to fail, Lippman asks Elaine for advice in exchange for 30% of the profits. She tells him that he must make the whole muffin, then pop the top from the stump, and give the stumps to the homeless shelter. However, after complaints about the muffin stumps, the shelter refuses to take them.

While trying to even out his chest hair, Jerry ends up shaving it all off. He worries what his girlfriend Alex will think, until he discovers she is fond of hairless dogs. He continues to shave his chest, telling Alex he is naturally hairless. Kramer warns Jerry that shaving will accelerate the hair's growth.

Elaine confesses to Kramer that the stories he sold to J. Peterman were put into Peterman's biography. Kramer goes to the book signing, claiming he is "the real Peterman", and is kicked out. He then starts conducting "The Peterman Reality Tour" on a school bus for $37.50. Kramer asks Jerry and Alex to take the tour. Elaine asks Kramer to get rid of the muffin stumps on his tour. Kramer prolongs the tour into the night, searching in vain for a dump that will take the stumps. As the full moon comes out, Jerry's chest begins itching from hair growth. He runs off the bus and into the forest to scratch his chest, howling like a werewolf at the relief.

Elaine hires Newman to eat the muffin stumps.

== Production ==
"The Peterman Reality Tour" was based on Kenny Kramer's real-life "Kramer's Reality Tour". The original script had a completely different Elaine story, involving Kramer acquiring a police scanner and using it to eavesdrop on his neighbors. Elaine then used info obtained from the police scanner against her boyfriend. Two days before filming, an episode of Frasier used a similar story, so writer Spike Feresten quickly came up with the muffin tops story as a replacement, inspired by a girlfriend named Laurie who only ate the tops of muffins.

The luggage mishap was based on the time a man at a bar asked Feresten to watch his luggage. Rather than waiting as George does in the episode, Feresten abandoned the luggage when he left the bar an hour later. On the day of filming, the actor cast to play Don Tyler completely refused to bob his head. With no time to re-cast the part, a member of the production crew, Pete G. Papanickolas, was asked to fill the role.

The werewolf scene is a parody of Jack Nicholson's character from the 1994 film Wolf. The closing scene with Newman is a Pulp Fiction parody.
