= The Cigar Store Indian =

- Seinfeld episode
- Episode no.: Season 5 Episode 10
- Directed by: Tom Cherones
- Written by: Tom Gammill & Max Pross
- Production code: 510
- Original air date: December 9, 1993

Guest appearances
- Estelle Harris as Estelle Costanza; Jerry Stiller as Frank Costanza; Richard Fancy as Mr Lippman; Kimberly Norris as Winona; Sam Lloyd as Ricky; Carissa Channing as Sylvia; Benjamin W.S. Lum as Postman; Ralph Manza as Gepetto; Al Roker as himself

Episode chronology
← Previous "The Masseuse"	Next → "The Conversion"

"The Cigar Store Indian" is the 74th episode of the NBC sitcom Seinfeld. It is the tenth episode of the fifth season, and first aired on December 9, 1993. In this episode, Jerry gives Elaine a cigar store Indian, which starts his flirtation with a Native American off on the wrong foot; George brings a woman home while his parents are away; Elaine ends up on the hook for replacing George's father's copy of TV Guide; and Kramer comes up with a "coffee table book about coffee tables".

== Plot ==
George brings his friends over while his parents are out, but must leave no trace since he is not allowed to host "parties". George is horrified when Jerry leaves drink stains on a coffee table. He demands that Jerry drive him to refinish the table, so Jerry reneges on his promise to drive Elaine home for girls' poker night. Jerry hands her the Costanzas' TV Guide to read on the subway home.

Kramer is inspired by the incident to pitch a "coffee table book about coffee tables" to Elaine, who halfheartedly promises to present it to Mr. Lippman at Pendant Publishing. At Queensboro station, Kramer risks getting off to buy a gyro on the platform, believing he can get back in time. He gets only one arm through the closing doors, and gets his gyro stolen out of his hand. Ricky, a TV Guide fan, is delighted to learn that Kramer is not Elaine's boyfriend, and tries to impress her with his encyclopedic knowledge. Elaine leaves the TV Guide behind, and Ricky finds the Costanzas' address on it.

Jerry looks for an apology gift for Elaine at the refinishing shop, plotting to also impress Elaine's newly-single friend Winona. He buys a cigar store Indian, and George uses this chance to impress store employee Sylvia.

Jerry unveils the "kitschy" cigar store Indian, along with an apology card with a peace pipe joke, to a cold reception from Elaine's poker buddies. As he pantomimes tribal chants and dances with the Indian, Winona takes offense and walks out. Elaine, appalled, informs Jerry that Winona is Native American. Jerry apologizes to Winona and asks her out, but he then offends a Chinese postal worker by asking him for directions to a Chinese restaurant. Worse, Kramer, who gladly took the Indian off Elaine's hands, ululates a war cry to show off as his taxi passes by.

George takes Sylvia home, pretending the outdated decor and music are his own, and making an excuse for being locked out of the liquor cabinet. However, he leaves his condom wrapper on his parents' bed after sex. George and Jerry get the table back in time, but Frank is incensed that Elaine took his TV Guide, rendering his collection incomplete, and Estelle refuses to use the bed. George gets grounded.

Jerry gets a date with Winona after all, but starts catching himself saying every word with indigenous connotations, like "reservations" and "scalper". He manages to get Winona's issue of Frank's missing TV Guide for Elaine. Ricky delivers a papercraft bouquet he cut out of the TV Guide to the Costanzas'. Frank's outrage at this is placated when he and Ricky bond over his TV Guide collection. Elaine brings the replacement TV Guide, having dripped sauce all over it while eating a subway gyro. Ricky, leaping to defend Elaine from Frank, knocks over the TV Guide-laden coffee table. When Estelle takes the coffee table to refinish again, Sylvia learns the truth about George from her.

Winona needs her TV Guide back for the cover interview with Al Roker; Jerry catches himself once again as he is about to call her an Indian giver, but too late this time.

Kramer is disappointed that Elaine never intended to pitch his book, but runs into Lippman himself while trying to sell the Indian to an actual cigar store. Kramer sells it to Lippman instead, and personally pitches his book. Elaine arrives at the office to the horror of Lippman flaunting both the cigar store Indian and Kramer's book, and ends up assigned to work on the book.

Elaine and Jerry finally order a copy of the TV Guide for Frank. On the subway once more, Jerry risks getting off for a gyro, but gets only one arm through the closing doors, and gets his gyro stolen by Roker himself. Roker is delighted to learn that Jerry is not Elaine's boyfriend.

== Production ==
Tom Gammill and Max Pross's original draft for the episode was called "The Moose Head"; in this version, Jerry buys Elaine a moose head, and Winona is offended by the gift because she is an animal rights activist. Show creators Larry David and Jerry Seinfeld felt the moose head was too reminiscent of sitcoms from decades past, and directed Gammill and Pross to replace it with something more politically incorrect.

According to Pross, the incident with the Chinese postman was taken "almost verbatim" from his real life. While walking through Chinatown late at night, Pross asked a postman if he knew of a Chinese restaurant that was still open, and the postman started screaming at him, thinking Pross assumed he knew where the restaurants were because he was Chinese rather than because he was a postman.
