= The Doll (Seinfeld) =

- Seinfeld episode
- Episode no.: Season 7 Episode 17
- Directed by: Andy Ackerman
- Written by: Tom Gammill & Max Pross
- Production code: 716
- Original air date: February 22, 1996

Guest appearances
- Jerry Stiller as Frank Costanza/Giuseppe; Estelle Harris as Estelle Costanza; Heidi Swedberg as Susan Ross; Kathy Griffin as Sally Weaver; Mark Metcalf as The Maestro; Mary Jo Keenan as Deena Lazzari; Monica Allison as Stewardess; Larry Braman as Stage Manager; John Lizzi as The Other Guy

Episode chronology
← Previous "The Shower Head"	Next → "The Friar's Club"
- Seinfeld season 7

"The Doll" is the 127th episode of the NBC sitcom Seinfeld. This is the 17th episode for the seventh season, originally airing on February 22, 1996.

In this episode, Sally Weaver imposes her own whims on Jerry when he least needs it, while Jerry does the same to Elaine; George is haunted by Susan's doll that looks like his mother; and Frank opens an overly cramped billiard room, while searching for a lost cousin with the Maestro's help.

== Plot ==
At Susan's behest, while performing in Memphis, Jerry invites her college roommate, Sally Weaver. Sally is insufferably friendly and saddles Jerry with an unwieldy wedding gift for George and Susan, to be handled with care. While in Tuscany with the Maestro, Elaine photographed a man outside a storefront with the "Costanza" name; Frank wants the photo as a lead on finding an overseas cousin he has not seen since childhood.

Back in New York, Jerry finds that the gift is a doormat in an oversized box; that Sally could have used her privilege as a FedEx executive to ship it; and that Sally, arriving in New York just days later, could have brought it herself. However, Jerry has safeguarded the doormat at the expense of a bottle of Memphis barbecue sauce in his own bag getting smashed. Having planned to show off the novelty bottle on his upcoming TV appearance with Charles Grodin, Jerry has neglected to write new jokes for the show.

Frank converts George's old bedroom into a billiard room, but with no space to maneuver a pool stick; he and Kramer waste hours shooting just one game. Susan displays her doll collection in her and George's bedroom, but George is aghast at a creepy doll that resembles his mother, which Susan insists on bringing to bed. After a sleepless night, George shows the doll to Jerry, then reflexively hears Estelle scolding him through the doll. Jerry insistently recommends a new electric toothbrush, to Elaine's indifference.

Needing another bottle of the sauce, Jerry vindictively saddles Sally with bringing a whole case on her flight, but he fails to inconvenience her thanks to an empty seat next to her. Worse, she willfully picked a different, "better" sauce for Jerry, leaving him empty-handed again. The Maestro brings the photo to Frank, and is invited to play against him and Kramer; they are impressed by the Maestro's "conductor's trick" of going pantsless before a concert to keep a crisp pants crease, so all three play without pants. When the Maestro steps out, Kramer uses his conductor's baton as a space-saving pool stick, expertly sewing up the game.

Jerry's fellow guest on Grodin's show is the lesser-known of the The Three Tenors, whose name no one can remember. Since the Maestro fell out with Elaine for spilling wine on his signed photo of the third tenor, Elaine gets the tenor's autograph backstage, hoping to reconcile. As she leaves, Jerry saddles her with an electric toothbrush in an oversized box, while going pantsless just like the Maestro. Meanwhile, Jerry opts to use Susan's doll on Grodin's show rather than write material, but Sally answers Susan's phone and intercepts his request. Sally willfully brings a different, "funnier" doll, while the third tenor confuses Jerry's pants for a napkin, leaving Jerry going on air still empty-handed and with no pants to wear.

Juggling the toothbrush and her signed poster, Elaine keeps the poster unsullied at her own expense through several close calls. She delights the Maestro with the gift, but ruins it after all when the unwieldy toothbrush box causes another wine spill. Meanwhile, the Maestro, in concert, finds his baton uselessly bent by Kramer's abuse and his orchestra gives a poor performance.

Taking the Maestro's photo to show George, Frank sees Susan's doll; hearing Estelle scolding him through the doll, he defiantly rips its head off. Later, in Tuscany, Frank finds the man from the photo, who looks exactly like Frank but is a total stranger.

== Production ==
When the episode's script was brought to the read-through, it was titled "The Doormat" and included a plotline in which Elaine's portrait is painted in pastels. Elaine thinks the artist painted it because he is infatuated with her, but he then sells the portrait to Frank Costanza, who puts it in the pool room. While the Maestro is playing pool with Frank and Kramer, he backs into the portrait, imprinting the image of Elaine's face onto his underwear. The script underwent significant rewriting after the read-through. In particular, show creators Larry David and Jerry Seinfeld felt the portrait of Elaine story was too complicated, so they replaced it with the story of José Carreras. David also tweaked George's story, coming up with the idea of a doll that looks like George's mother; in the original script, George was disturbed because Susan had a creepy-looking doll collection, with no individual doll standing out.

Writers Tom Gammill and Max Pross encountered the practice of wearing no pants before a show to maintain the crease while visiting their friend Sam Denoff backstage with Jerry Lewis. Gamill and Pross came up with Jerry's predicament in the episode because they were amused by the idea of Seinfeld, who in real life fastidiously prepared for every show, having no material ready out of apparent laziness. The resolution to Jerry's story was filmed but deleted due to episode length constraints. In the unused climactic scene, Jerry is inspired to go on stage without his pants and tell the story of why he is not wearing any pants, which earns tremendous laughs from the audience. Other cut scenes include George awkwardly confronting his mother after sleeping with the doll, and Frank carrying his large package for Carlo on the flight to Tuscany, making the passenger beside him uncomfortable. The latter scene also revealed the contents of the package; Frank was re-gifting the doormat.

According to Gammill and Pross, most guest stars on Seinfeld kept a polite distance from the regular cast during production, but Kathy Griffin would freely, and sometimes loudly, engage the show's stars in conversation. Griffin later performed a stand-up comedy routine alleging that Jerry Seinfeld was rude to her during filming. Seinfeld was so amused by this that he had it written into a later episode, "The Cartoon", where Griffin returned as Sally Weaver.
