= The English Patient (Seinfeld) =

- Seinfeld episode
- Episode no.: Season 8 Episode 17
- Directed by: Andy Ackerman
- Written by: Steve Koren
- Production code: 817
- Original air date: March 13, 1997

Guest appearances
- Barney Martin as Morty Seinfeld; Liz Sheridan as Helen Seinfeld; John O'Hurley as J. Peterman; Earl Schuman as Izzy Mandelbaum Sr.; Lloyd Bridges as Izzy Mandelbaum; Gene Dynarski as Izzy Mandelbaum Jr.; Todd Jeffries as Blaine; Chelsea Noble as Danielle; O'Neal Compton as Earl Haffler; Lisa Mende as Carol; Marco Rodriguez as Guillermo; Joe Urla as Dugan; Jill Talley as Gail; Jill Holden as Lisa; Edgar Small as Sid Luckman; Lauren Bowles as Waitress; Juan Garcia as Jaime; Jeff Miller as Neil

Episode chronology
← Previous "The Pothole"	Next → "The Nap"
- Seinfeld season 8

"The English Patient" is the 151st episode of the NBC sitcom Seinfeld. It was the 17th episode for the eighth season and aired on March 13, 1997. The English Patient, central to Elaine's storyline in this episode, won Best Picture at the 69th Academy Awards, eleven days after this episode aired.

== Plot ==
At Monk's Café, a beautiful woman, Danielle, mistakes George for her boyfriend Neil. George becomes obsessed with the notion that he is so similar to Neil that, with only one minor change, he too could be dating women like Danielle. He repeatedly goes out with Danielle so he can press her for more information about Neil.

Elaine and her date, Blaine, go to the movies. She wants to see the comedy Sack Lunch but Blaine prefers The English Patient. When Sack Lunch gets sold out, they go see The English Patient. After the movie, Elaine finds it boring and stupid. Her dislike for The English Patient alienates her from everyone and Blaine subsequently dumps her. Not wishing to upset J. Peterman, when he asks if she likes the movie, she claims not to have seen it. He has Elaine drop everything so he can take her to see it. She endures an hour or so before exclaiming her distaste for the movie. Peterman responds by firing her, but she convinces him to let her keep her job by agreeing to take a trip to Tunisia (the filming location of The English Patient) and living in a cave.

Jerry is going to Florida to help his parents move out. Kramer asks him to pick up some Cubans for him and gives him a T-shirt that says "#1 Dad". Thinking he means Cuban cigars, Jerry agrees. Jerry's father, Morty, finds the "#1 Dad" T-shirt and proudly wears it.

Kramer's "Cubans" are human cigar rollers he is trafficking to the United States in an attempt to skirt America's laws prohibiting Cuban imports. His attempt to start a business in Cuban-quality made-in-America cigars fails when investors recognize they are from the Dominican Republic. Kramer fears the unemployed Dominicans, whom he educated about communism, plan to revolt since they have nothing to do.

At the Del Boca Vista exercise room, Jerry meets 80-year-old Izzy Mandelbaum. Izzy challenges Jerry to a weightlifting competition, but throws out his back. Jerry and Morty visit his bedside to apologize. However, Izzy wants to compete with Morty over being the best dad after seeing the "#1 Dad" shirt and throws his back out again. Jerry returns to New York, where Izzy has come to see a back specialist. Izzy's son and father show up – both men injure their backs while trying to lift the hospital's TV. The Mandelbaums complain that their Magic Pan restaurant franchise will fail since they cannot roll the crêpes while laid up. Jerry suggests they employ Kramer's "Cubans". The Dominicans, however, roll the crêpes too tightly, causing the filling to spray out and burn customers.

When George tells Jerry about the situation with Danielle, Jerry points out that he has no more need to find out about Neil, since he has replaced him as Danielle's boyfriend. George meets Neil in a hospital, after Neil was burned by a crêpe. Neil's face is bandaged, so that George never sees what he looks like. Even though she agreed to move in with George, Danielle changes plans, taking Neil to an overseas clinic similar to The English Patient. Neil declares that he "won" Danielle and George vindictively pulls out his intravenous line as he leaves.

Elaine's plane to Tunisia is about to show Sack Lunch, but is hijacked by the angry Dominicans, who are all wearing "#1 Dad" T-shirts. They demand the movie be shut off, much to Elaine's dismay.

== Production ==
The table read for "The English Patient" took place on February 7, 1997. The scenes outside the theatre were filmed on February 9, and the majority of scenes were filmed live in front of a studio audience on February 11.

The people who appear on the theatrical poster for Sack Lunch are Seinfeld producer Tim Kaiser and his family.

A scene in which Elaine and Peterman finish watching The English Patient, and Peterman proposes they watch it again and take notes on the clothing so that they can add it to the J. Peterman catalog, was deleted before broadcast. As a result, the finished episode implies that Elaine's outburst occurred during her second viewing of The English Patient rather than her third, and leaves Peterman's remark "I hope you're watching the clothes, Elaine, because I can't take my eyes off the passion" unexplained.

Neil was played by Jeff Miller, who also served as George actor Jason Alexander's stand-in. The IV pull at the end of the scene was improvised by Alexander during filming.

== Critical response ==
Dr. Michael Dunne writes in his essay "Seinfeld as Intertextual Comedy" (his episode-numbering system appears in parentheses):

In "The English Patient" (8017) Elaine is one of the few Americans who will admit in 1997 that she finds the 1996 Academy Award movie The English Patient boring. In this respect The English Patient serves as Schindler's List does in "The Raincoats" (5019), as the movie that everyone is supposed to admire. "The English Patient" surpasses "The Raincoats" in terms of intertextual organicism, however, since the comic plot of the former also requires a character named Neil to be so badly burned by a crêpe that his gorgeous girlfriend will take him to England for burn treatment. All parallels to the plot of The English Patient are surely deliberate.

Noel Murray of The A.V. Club wrote, "Who bears more responsibility for the declining reputation of The English Patient: Elaine Benes, or Harvey Weinstein?" David Sims, at the same website, reviewed the episode with a certainty that Elaine is its "real hero": "Her finest moment is when Peterman, having gone on about loving the movie, asks her if she's seen it, and she just can't bring herself to lie and say she liked it, instead telling the fatal, but nobler white lie that she hasn't seen it yet. That means Peterman drags her to it again, of course, but then we're treated to the sight of Elaine sprawled in her seat, bored to the point of death, so we the audience are the real winners." Sims called the episode "classic Seinfeld, as well, in that it's a plot where very little happens but it's nonetheless very funny." David L. Coddon of U-T San Diego remarked in 2008, "For some of us, the 1997 Seinfeld episode titled 'The English Patient' is infinitely more entertaining than the 1996 film of the same name – the length of which seemed infinite – that inspired it. We who found the Oscar-winning (repeat, Oscar-winning!) movie lumbering and muddled can watch over and over again in reruns Elaine Benes' (Julia Louis-Dreyfus) derisive dismissals of and active assaults on The English Patient."
