= The Pothole =

- Seinfeld episode
- Episode no.: Season 8 Episode 16
- Directed by: Andy Ackerman
- Written by: Steve O'Donnell & Dan O'Keefe
- Production code: 816
- Original air date: February 20, 1997

Guest appearances
- Wayne Knight as Newman; Kristin Davis as Jenna; Jack McGee as Ralph; George Cheung as Owner; Seraiah Coral as Mrs. Allister; Radmar Agana Jao as Delivery Guy; Walter Addison as Man

Episode chronology
← Previous "The Susie"	Next → "The English Patient"
- Seinfeld season 8

"The Pothole" is the 150th episode of the NBC sitcom Seinfeld. This was the 16th episode for the eighth season. It aired on February 20, 1997. In the episode, Jerry is unwilling to kiss his girlfriend after she unknowingly brushes her teeth with a toothbrush that fell in the toilet, George tries to recover his keys from a paved-over pothole, Kramer adopts a highway and handles the maintenance work himself, and Elaine moves into a janitor's closet so that she can get delivery from a favorite Chinese restaurant. This episode earned Andy Ackerman an Emmy Award for Outstanding Direction. Jerry Seinfeld, in an appearance on The Tonight Show the night before the episode aired, declared "The Pothole" to be one of the best episodes of the series.

== Plot ==
Kramer has adopted one mile of a highway

Jerry accidentally knocks his girlfriend Jenna's toothbrush into the toilet, and she uses it before he can tell her. Since she is as fastidious about cleanliness as him, he is afraid to tell her afterwards. He directs Jenna to sterilize her mouth with various cleaning agents, but cannot get over his fear that she may still be unsanitary and can not kiss her. Jerry tells Jenna about the toothbrush; angered that he did not tell her sooner, she locks him out of his apartment and tells him she stuck something of his in the toilet. Jerry throws away everything he owns that could have even partially fit in the toilet, unable to trust it is clean.

George realizes he has misplaced his keys, and retraces his steps to where he jumped over a pothole that has since been paved over. He employs a freelance maintenance crew to dig the keys out, but he succumbs to thriftiness and agrees to do the jackhammering himself so that he only has to pay for the equipment.

Kramer complains about the failing highway infrastructure after running over an abandoned sewing machine, so he adopts a one-mile piece of the 'Arthur Burghardt Expressway' through the Adopt a Highway program. Not trusting the work to the city's maintenance crew, Kramer cleans the road himself and repaints the four-lane highway to two extra-wide lanes, but his efforts only result in mass confusion and congestion.

Elaine tries to order a new Chinese dish, Supreme Flounder, but she lives across the street from the boundary of the Chinese restaurant's delivery area. Her neighbors across the street refuse to let her order from their apartments, so Elaine moves into a janitor's closet in the building. The superintendent believes her to be the janitor and pesters her about maintenance that needs to be done. Elaine brings the building's trash to the dump in Jerry's car, swerving all over Kramer's wide lane and unknowingly dropping a sewing machine on the road, similar to the one Kramer ran over.

Being used for garbage eliminates Jerry's car as a sanitary haven, and he breaks down in front of Jenna. Satisfied she has got her revenge, she tells him what she put in the toilet: the toilet brush. George unintentionally severs a water main while digging up the road, causing Jenna's toilet to erupt and blast its contents onto her. Jerry is disgusted and dumps her on the spot. Kramer tries to return the highway to four lanes but spills flammable paint thinner all over the road. Newman drives by. His mail truck catches the sewing machine and drags it on the highway, sending up sparks that ignite the paint thinner and cause his truck to go up in flames. A torched, stranded Newman wanders off in a daze. Kramer offers him a ride, but after getting no response, flees to evade the law.

== Production ==
The Arthur Burghardt Expressway was named for actor Arthur Burghardt, who had been called in to audition for the series several times without being cast. The highway scenes were filmed on a studio roadway loop. Kramer's dash across the highway for a crushed can was improvised by actor Michael Richards, terrifying the drivers and the onlooking cast and crew, especially since the drivers were only extras and production crew, not trained stunt drivers.

The scene where the four principals are jammed into the janitor closet is an homage to the famous Marx Brothers state room scene in A Night at the Opera. Newman's line "Oh, the humanity!" references Herbert Morrison's report of the Hindenburg disaster.

== Release ==
High-definition releases of Seinfeld on syndication and streaming services have exclusively been presented in the 16:9 Widescreen aspect ratio. In these versions, the pothole that appears in this episode gets omitted from the frame due to the 16:9 crop. This has frequently been used as an example to emphasize the loss of creative intent from 16:9 conversions of content previously framed for a 4:3 presentation.
