= The Susie =

- Seinfeld episode
- Episode no.: Season 8 Episode 15
- Directed by: Andy Ackerman
- Written by: David Mandel
- Production code: 815
- Original air date: February 13, 1997

Guest appearances
- John O'Hurley as J. Peterman; Lee Arenberg as Mike; Shannon Kenny as Allison; Megan Cole as Peggy; Richard Herd as Wilhelm; Jane Edith Wilson as Woman

Episode chronology
← Previous "The Van Buren Boys"	Next → "The Pothole"
- Seinfeld season 8

"The Susie" is the 149th episode of the sitcom Seinfeld. This was the 15th episode for the eighth season, originally airing on February 13, 1997. In this episode, Jerry unintentionally terrorizes a bookie, George avoids all contact with his girlfriend so that she cannot break up with him, and Elaine ends up leading a double life at the office after a co-worker starts mistakenly calling her "Susie".

== Plot ==
Kramer's friend Mike has become a bookie. Kramer, a compulsive gambler, places bets with Mike on Jerry's behalf. But when Jerry wins, Mike can't pay up. When Jerry accidentally slams his trunk lid on Mike's thumbs, breaking them, Mike becomes afraid of him. Mike tries to make up his debt by fixing Jerry's trunk but gets trapped inside.

Kramer sets his watch ahead one hour even though Daylight Saving Time hasn't started yet. Elaine's co-worker Peggy calls Elaine "Susie," but Elaine neglects to correct her. When she attempts to do so later, Peggy unknowingly bad-mouths Elaine, prompting Elaine to vouch for Elaine as Susie, and when Peggy addresses Elaine as "Suze," Elaine vehemently objects to the use of any diminutive. Peggy complains to Peterman about the rude outburst, and Peterman arranges a meeting between Peggy, Elaine, and "Susie." At the meeting, Elaine manages to simultaneously pretend that she is Susie to Peggy and that she is Elaine to Peterman, but Peterman then begins giving "Susie" her own assignments. While driving Elaine, Jerry recognizes that her charade has gone too far and tells her she should "eliminate Susie." Mike, still trapped, overhears and interprets this to mean murder.

George is excited about Steinbrenner's ball because he wants to make a grand entrance with his girlfriend Allison with her wearing a backless dress. Allison tells George, "We need to talk." He goes to great lengths to avoid her so that she cannot break up with him. She resorts to using Kramer as a go-between, and Kramer breaks up with George on her behalf. George tries in turn to use Kramer as a go-between for making up with Allison, but she refuses, and Kramer shows up at the ball in her place. During a scuffle in the lobby, George tears off the back of Kramer's tuxedo, and Kramer is thrown into the main hall, making a (backless) "grand entrance" of his own.

Elaine tells Peterman that Susie committed suicide, so Peterman organizes a memorial service. Elaine and Jerry attend. When he arrives, Peterman rear-ends Jerry's car, inadvertently freeing Mike. Peggy is confused to see "Susie" at the service, so Elaine belatedly corrects her about her name. Mike bursts in and accuses Jerry of murdering Susie.

Peterman proposes establishing a foundation in Susie's honor, so Elaine finally tells him the truth. However, he misunderstands and expects Elaine to devote all of her non-working hours to running the foundation.

== Production ==
The impetus for the episode's story was when one of writer David Mandel's co-workers on Saturday Night Live called him the wrong name. Mandel didn't correct him, so he continued to call Mandel by this name for their entire time together on the show. Mandel said he was struck by the fact that there was no one on Saturday Night Live with that name that he knew of, inspiring "The Susie"'s core idea of a misremembered name leading to a belief in a non-existent person.

George's answering machine message, a George-sung parody of "Theme from The Greatest American Hero (Believe It or Not)", was also based on real-life events. A friend of a friend of Mandel's used this same parody for her answering machine message. Since actor Jason Alexander has a good singing voice in real life, he was told to sing as poorly as he could after his first take of the song was judged too good to be funny.

Mandel later said he considers "The Susie" one of the weakest TV episodes he has written, feeling that the bookie plotline didn't go anywhere.
