= The Masseuse (Seinfeld) =

- Seinfeld episode
- Episode no.: Season 5 Episode 9
- Directed by: Tom Cherones
- Written by: Peter Mehlman
- Production code: 509
- Original air date: November 18, 1993

Guest appearances
- Lisa Edelstein as Karen; Jennifer Coolidge as Jodi; Anthony Cistaro as Joel

Episode chronology
← Previous "The Barber"	Next → "The Cigar Store Indian"
- Seinfeld season 5

"The Masseuse" is the 73rd episode of the NBC sitcom Seinfeld. It is the ninth episode of the fifth season, and first aired on November 18, 1993. In this episode, Jerry wants a massage more than sex from his masseuse girlfriend, while George wants the approval of Jerry's girlfriend more than his own. Elaine struggles with her boyfriend sharing a name with serial killer Joel Rifkin.

== Plot ==
Elaine's boyfriend is a handsome gentleman, but he is unfortunately named Joel Rifkin, the same as the notorious serial killer. She indignantly defends him against coworkers' jokes, but is paranoid enough to profile Joel's psychology. Jerry assures her that Joel not having vomited for eight years is normal, since Jerry keeps track of his own vomiting anniversaries. Kramer warns Elaine that serial killers are all adopted, and calls dibs on Elaine's spare ticket to a Giants game.

George has gotten back together with Karen, and, for the sake of showing off his "non-date personality", goes on a double date with Jerry and his masseuse girlfriend Jodi. Karen is charmed by George while Jodi is plainly annoyed by his company. George sterotypes against attractive women for avoiding traffic tickets, and Jodi calls out his implication that her own sister, who just got ticketed, is not attractive. Jerry, who wants a massage from Jodi more than he does makeouts or sex, oversells his sore muscles to no avail, even as Karen books Jodi's services. Failing to notice he made a poor impression, George fixates on Jodi while ignoring Karen's affection.

Joel grabs Elaine's neck from behind for a surprise massage, frightening her. Elaine admires the names of famous football players, planting the idea of changing her name "for no real reasons".

Jerry notifies George that Jodi outright dislikes him. They find Jodi leaving Jerry's building after giving Kramer a massage, and George insists on carrying her massage table and hailing a taxi for her. Despite his eagerness to please, she remains cold. George's obsession deepens, to Karen's dismay, and he insists that he must be liked by everyone.

Kramer, still in a robe, sensually praises Jodi's massage in lurid detail for Jerry. Jerry explodes in jealousy, and denies him further massages. He takes offense at Kramer having paid for his girlfriend's services.

At the Giants game, Elaine is disturbed to learn that Joel was adopted. Kramer, having forgotten his ID, cannot claim his ticket without paging the ticketholder. The stadium PA calls for "Joel Rifkin", alarming the players and audience alike. As a result, Joel decides to choose a new name for himself, but he and Elaine fall out because their name choices are irreconcilable. Kramer returns from the game, in need of a massage again from diving over seats to catch the game-winning football. Jerry resolves to get his own massage that very night.

George breaks off from making out with Karen to go find Jodi, despite Karen's ultimatum that she likes him and Jodi does not. Meanwhile, Jerry, having put on sensual New Age music, unfolds Jodi's massage table in his apartment, gets on, and forces her hands on him. Jodi cannot go through with the massage, refusing to do so nonconsensually. As she walks out, George arrives to confess his love, realizing that he will never find another woman who hates him this much. With Jerry's blessing, George chases after Jodi.

== Cultural references ==
While visiting her boyfriend, Joel Rifkin, Elaine is seen reading an NFL Gameday program. She suggests that many people these days are named "Deion", referencing Deion Sanders.

While brainstorming new first names for Joel, Elaine suggests "O. J." (after O. J. Simpson) as a name that would be less associated with murder. Almost seven months after this episode aired, Simpson was arrested and charged with the double murder of his ex-wife and her friend.

The episode is the first on screen appearance of two time Primetime Emmy Award winning actress Jennifer Coolidge.
