= The Invitations =

- Seinfeld episode
- Episode no.: Season 7 Episode 24
- Directed by: Andy Ackerman
- Written by: Larry David
- Production code: 724
- Original air date: May 16, 1996

Guest appearances
- Heidi Swedberg as Susan Ross; Janeane Garofalo as Jeannie; Stephen Root as Mr. Lager; Victor Raider-Wexler as Doctor; John Riggi as Teller; Sue Goodman as Clerk; Julie Claire as Waitress; Fred Goehner as Delivery Guy

Episode chronology
← Previous "The Wait Out"	Next → "The Foundation"
- Seinfeld season 7

"The Invitations" is the 24th and final episode of the seventh season of Seinfeld and the 134th overall episode. It originally aired on NBC on May 16, 1996, and was the last episode written by co-creator Larry David before he left the writing staff at the end of this season (returning only to write the series finale in 1998). This episode was directed by Andy Ackerman.

As the season finale, "The Invitations" resolves the season 7 story arc of George's engagement to Susan. Afraid to call off their impending wedding, George makes last-ditch efforts to get Susan to do it. Jerry proposes to a woman who is a mirror image of himself, and Kramer challenges the wording of a bank's service guarantee.

The black comedy of the engagement story arc's resolution was controversial. In 2005, TV Guide ranked the episode #8 as part of its "Top 100 Most Unexpected Moments in TV History".

== Plot ==
When shopping for wedding invitations, George insists on purchasing a discounted brand with defective glue much to Susan's dismay. Realising he has no remaining options to cancel the wedding, George contemplates drastic alternatives, such as fleeing to China or hoping for a fatal incident.

Elaine plans to be the next to move on from Jerry's company after George. Jerry imagines himself alone with Kramer as old fogies, going through their umpteenth argument about nothing. He is saved from an oncoming car by a passerby, Jeannie Steinman, who deftly launches into the same brand of observational comedy as his own. Seeing that Jeannie shares all of his own childish whims, Jerry declares that he has found his soulmate—in himself. Kramer recoils at the prospect of two like-minded Jerrys.

Elaine inspires George to start smoking to turn off Susan, but he chokes and gags getting through just one cigarette. With Kramer and Elaine both rejected as wedding ushers and attending without dates, George dreads a fiasco of a wedding. Kramer advises that imposing a prenuptial agreement is sure to drive Susan away, but this request only cracks her up because, outearning George, she should be asking him to sign.

A neighborhood bank offers $100 to any customer not greeted with "a hello". Putting this guarantee to the test, Kramer gets greeted with "hey" instead, and demands compensation. A committee of employees, each using an idiosyncratic greeting, agrees on a $20 concession to satisfy him.

In a sentimental moment, Jerry hurries to propose to Jeannie. Only after celebrating her acceptance does he realize that he actually hates himself, and therefore her, leaving Kramer vindicated.

Despite the weak and foul-tasting glue, Susan endures meticulously licking hundreds of invitation envelopes until she passes out. The hospital pronounces her dead from toxic glue found on cheap envelopes. Faced with this tragedy, the group is unmoved, and puzzled by how to react appropriately. Jerry is left in George's shoes, unhappily engaged on his own.

With Susan not yet in the ground, George calls Marisa Tomei to meet up again after the funeral. Tomei hangs up.

== Production ==
The episode's writer, Seinfeld co-creator Larry David, originally came up with George's plan to move to China for the season two episode "The Ex-Girlfriend". It was cut from that episode prior to broadcast, so he repurposed the material for "The Invitations".

Yankees owner George Steinbrenner, long portrayed on Seinfeld by the voice of Larry David, filmed a guest appearance playing himself in this episode, despite director Andy Ackerman's concern that future episodes could never use the joke Steinbrenner again; this became a moot point when Steinbrenner's scenes were cut for time. In the deleted scenes, Steinbrenner becomes Elaine's wedding date because the singles table is for "losers"; the two then switch roles by trading seats, and Elaine, with her back to the camera, rambles obliviously while Steinbrenner slinks away unnoticed. A number of scenes developing Jerry and Jeannie's relationship were also cut.

The cast reading for the episode was on March 31, 1996. Filming commenced on April 1, and the majority of the scenes were filmed before a live studio audience on April 3.

This episode was temporarily pulled from syndication in the wake of the 2001 anthrax attacks in the United States in October. The episode returned to syndication in the summer of 2002.

This is the last episode to feature Larry David as executive producer. He returned to write the two-part finale, and voiced the character of George Steinbrenner for three episodes of Season 8.

On June 3, 2015, Jason Alexander said during an interview on The Howard Stern Show that Swedberg's character had been killed off due to incompatibility with the other stars' comedic rhythm on the show, and the decision was made to cut Swedberg after Jerry Seinfeld and Julia Louis-Dreyfus acted alongside her. The following day, Alexander apologized on Twitter for his comments, explaining that his words were ill-chosen and misconstrued, and that the decision to kill Susan had nothing to do with Swedberg. He added that Swedberg had more than once offered to adapt her acting to any suggestions he might have, and he had declined, and that while he always felt the rhythm between the two of them was off, show creators David and Seinfeld and the show's fans clearly felt the chemistry between them was just what it should be.

== Reaction ==
The episode's ending received a very mixed public reaction.

Heidi Swedberg, who played Susan, has stated she had no problem with her character's death, explaining in an interview with Entertainment Weekly that "A lot of the show's humor is based on the fact that the main characters are not nice people. They admit to things the rest of us think about but don't like to admit." For months after the episode's broadcast, fans recognizing her on the street expressed frustration and resentment regarding her character's fate. Similarly, Jason Alexander claims that fans of George's character turned on him only once, and that was over Susan’s death. Alexander later said, "On that set, funny was the ruler, and it was unquestionably funny. Wrong and rude and dangerous—but funny."

In December 2005, the episode was listed at number eight as part of the "Top 100 Most Unexpected Moments in TV History" by TV Guide and TV Land.
