= Ruth Cohen (actress) =

American actress

- Cohen in a 1995 episode of Seinfeld
- Born: 1929 or 1930; New York City, U.S.
- Died: August 23, 2008 (aged 78); Los Angeles, California, U.S.
- Occupation: Actress
- Years active: 1987–2006
- Known for: Seinfeld

Ruth Cohen (1929 or 1930 – August 23, 2008) was an American character actress who worked primarily as an extra on television sitcoms. She is best known for her recurring role as a cashier on the NBC sitcom Seinfeld (1992–1998).

== Biography ==
Cohen was born in the Bronx, New York, and began acting in the 1980s after raising two children. She played the background role of cashier in Monk's Café on Seinfeld, appearing in 101 of the show's 180 episodes. She had brief speaking roles in the episodes "The Gum," "The Foundation," and "The Junk Mail." She also appeared in programs such as The Golden Girls and Murder, She Wrote.

Cohen died of a heart attack on August 23, 2008, aged 78, in the Panorama City neighborhood of Los Angeles. Her memorial service and burial were held at the Mount Sinai Memorial Park Cemetery in Hollywood Hills.

== Filmography ==
=== Film ===
Year	Title	Role	Notes
1999	Life Among the Cannibals	Cigarette Lady	
2003	The Cat in the Hat	Old Lady #2	Uncredited

=== Television ===
Year	Title	Role	Notes
1987	L.A. Law	Juror	Episode: "Fifty Ways to Floss Your Lover" Uncredited
1987–1988	The Golden Girls	Woman shopping in grocery store/woman at play tryouts	2 episodes Uncredited
1989	Murder She Wrote	Party guest	Uncredited
1992–1998	Seinfeld	Ruthie Cohen	Recurring role; 101 episodes
1999	Dharma & Greg	Lady on Street	Episode: "See Dharma Run" Uncredited
2000	Malcolm in the Middle	Checkout Clerk	Episode: "Francis Escapes" Uncredited
2000	V.I.P.	Elevator Woman	Episode: "Third Eye Blond" Credited as Ruthie Cohen
2005–2007	Seinfeld: Inside Look	Ruthie Cohen	Recurring role; 4 episodes Archive footage
2006	NCIS	Cafeteria Cashier	Episode: "Hiatus (Part I)" Uncredited
