= Seinfeld season 8 =

Seinfeld
- Season 8
- DVD cover
- Showrunner: Jerry Seinfeld
- Starring: Jerry Seinfeld; Julia Louis-Dreyfus; Michael Richards; Jason Alexander
- No. of episodes: 22

Release
- Original network: NBC
- Original release: September 19, 1996 – May 15, 1997

Season chronology
- ← Previous; Season 7 Next → Season 9

The eighth season of Seinfeld, an American comedy television series began airing on September 19, 1996, and concluded on May 15, 1997, on NBC.

The eighth season marked a turning point in the series. Larry David resigned as executive producer, making way for his replacement by Seinfeld. Cold opens took the role of Jerry's comedy routines, as Seinfeld was too busy to write more jokes, and "the show about nothing" became more absurdist and surreal.

== Production ==
Seinfeld was produced by Castle Rock Entertainment and aired on NBC in the United States. The eighth season was the first to be produced after Castle Rock Entertainment's parent company Turner Broadcasting System was acquired by Time Warner. The season's early episodes still have the byline "A Turner Company" for the Castle Rock Entertainment logo in the end credits, as the deal officially closed in October 1996. For the later episodes, the byline is removed.

The executive producers were Jerry Seinfeld, George Shapiro, and Howard West with Tom Gammill and Max Pross as supervising producers. Bruce Kirschbaum was the executive consultant. This season was directed by Andy Ackerman.

The series was set predominantly in an apartment block on New York City's Upper West Side; however, the eighth season was shot and mostly filmed in CBS Studio Center in Studio City, California. The show features Jerry Seinfeld as himself, and a host of Jerry's friends and acquaintances, which include George Costanza, Elaine Benes, and Cosmo Kramer, portrayed by Jason Alexander, Julia Louis-Dreyfus and Michael Richards, respectively.

Throughout the season, Julia Louis-Dreyfus was pregnant with her son Charlie, who was born two weeks after the season finished airing. Her character had to spend the latter half of this season hiding her belly behind furniture and laundry baskets, since the pregnancy started to become more noticeable by that point.

== Episodes ==
No. overall	No. in season	Title	Directed by	Written by	Original release date	Prod. code	US viewers (millions)
135	1	"The Foundation"	Andy Ackerman	Alec Berg & Jeff Schaffer	September 19, 1996	801	33.72
While George would rather forget his fiancee Susan's tragic demise, Susan's parents want to keep her memory alive by creating a foundation. Jerry reunites with Dolores (aka "Mulva") from "The Junior Mint". J. Peterman has a nervous breakdown and leaves Elaine in charge, and Kramer takes up martial arts.
136	2	"The Soul Mate"	Andy Ackerman	Peter Mehlman	September 26, 1996	802	33.24
Kramer falls for Jerry's girlfriend and goes to Newman for advice. Elaine tells her friends she does not want a baby after her woman friends convince her to. George thinks the foundation lawyer assumes that he killed Susan.
137	3	"The Bizarro Jerry"	Andy Ackerman	David Mandel	October 3, 1996	803	31.62
Elaine has new friends who are opposites of Jerry, George and Kramer. Jerry dates a woman who has "man hands." George uses a picture of Jerry's date to meet attractive women. Kramer uses a bathroom in an office building and begins working there.
138	4	"The Little Kicks"	Andy Ackerman	Spike Feresten	October 10, 1996	804	32.24
Elaine holds a party for her co-workers where she loses respect when they see her dance. Jerry and Kramer go to the movies with a friend who makes bootleg tapes.
139	5	"The Package"	Andy Ackerman	Jennifer Crittenden	October 17, 1996	805	30.13
George finds out that the woman at a photo store is looking at his pictures. He tries to impress her by getting Kramer to take seductive pictures of him. Jerry refuses delivery of a package with no return address. Elaine tries to retrieve her medical records when she begins having problems with her doctor due to her attitude.
140	6	"The Fatigues"	Andy Ackerman	Gregg Kavet & Andy Robin	October 31, 1996	806	30.33
Jerry is interested when he learns that his girlfriend has a mentor. George prepares to give a speech on risk management. Elaine prepares to fire co-worker Eddie Sherman (Ned Bellamy) but instead promotes him when she approaches him.
141	7	"The Checks"	Andy Ackerman	Steve O'Donnell and Tom Gammill & Max Pross	November 7, 1996	807	32.01
Elaine learns her new boyfriend has some obsessive behaviors. Jerry keeps receiving checks from a guest appearance on Japanese television. Kramer warns George that his carpet cleaners are part of a religious cult.
142	8	"The Chicken Roaster"	Andy Ackerman	Alec Berg & Jeff Schaffer	November 14, 1996	808	34.09
A Kenny Rogers Chicken restaurant opens across from Jerry's apartment with very bright neon lights. Kramer cannot sleep because of the light and seeks solace at Jerry's where he becomes addicted to the chicken by Newman. Elaine begins using the J. Peterman expense account. George tries to score a second date with a saleswoman by leaving a large hat at her house.
143	9	"The Abstinence"	Andy Ackerman	Steve Koren	November 21, 1996	809	34.35
George's girlfriend has infectious mononucleosis, so they will not be able to have sex for at least 6 weeks. Jerry agrees to make an appearance at his former junior high's career day. Elaine meets a doctor who does not have a license yet. Kramer smokes in the coffee shop and is asked to leave.
144	10	"The Andrea Doria"	Andy Ackerman	Spike Feresten	December 19, 1996	810	29.65
Jerry takes Kramer to his self storage space where they learn Newman has been hoarding mail. George becomes excited about a new apartment he is about to move into. Elaine is set up on a blind date who has a hard time breaking up with people.
145	11	"The Little Jerry"	Andy Ackerman	Jennifer Crittenden	January 9, 1997	811	34.48
Kramer gets a pet rooster he names "Little Jerry Seinfeld". George visits a woman's prison where he does not see what he had expected. Elaine discovers her boyfriend once had a full head of hair and convinces him to grow it back. A store owner exposes Jerry's bad check currently on display which raises much discussion.
146	12	"The Money"	Andy Ackerman	Peter Mehlman	January 16, 1997	813	37.34
Jerry's parents sell their Cadillac to a neighbor in order to give Jerry some money. Jerry quickly buys back the car but remains stuck in Florida when he does not have money to return home. George's parents announce they are moving to Florida which the Seinfelds object to. Elaine returns to her old position at work.
147	13	"The Comeback"	David Owen Trainor	Gregg Kavet & Andy Robin	January 30, 1997	812	33.50
George has trouble thinking of a retort to one of his co-workers. Jerry buys a tennis racket believed to be used by a pro. Elaine and Kramer discuss employee picks at the video store. Kramer creates a living will.
148	14	"The Van Buren Boys"	Andy Ackerman	Darin Henry	February 6, 1997	814	33.82
Everyone seems to have a problem with Jerry's new girlfriend (Christine Taylor) whom he sees as "perfect". George interviews students for the foundation's first academic scholarship. Elaine is asked to ghostwrite the autobiography of J. Peterman. Kramer has a run-in with the infamous "Van Buren boys".
149	15	"The Susie"	Andy Ackerman	David Mandel	February 13, 1997	815	32.00
Elaine creates an alter ego named "Susie" who co-workers believe is actually real. Jerry's friend who once considered him a "phony" becomes a bookie. George avoids his girlfriend by screening his phone calls.
150	16	"The Pothole"	Andy Ackerman	Steve O'Donnell and Dan O'Keefe	February 20, 1997	816	33.83
Kramer adopts a piece of a highway after he complains about a very large pothole. Jerry's girlfriend (Kristin Davis) uses a toothbrush that was once dropped in the toilet. George brags about a new key ring given to him by George Steinbrenner.
151	17	"The English Patient"	Andy Ackerman	Steve Koren	March 13, 1997	817	31.27
Elaine hates a movie that everyone else seems to love. Jerry is challenged by one of his father's neighbors to a series of physical tests sending the old man, his father and his son to the hospital. A woman mistakes George for her boyfriend. Kramer imports some Cuban cigar rollers.
152	18	"The Nap"	Andy Ackerman	Gregg Kavet & Andy Robin	April 10, 1997	818	32.22
George creates a desk he can sleep in at work after having trouble sleeping. Jerry has his kitchen remodeled. Elaine's boyfriend worries about her back and buys her a mattress. Kramer begins swimming in the East River after becoming restricted at a community pool.
153	19	"The Yada Yada"	Andy Ackerman	Peter Mehlman and Jill Franklyn	April 24, 1997	819	31.64
George's girlfriend uses a particular phrase constantly. Jerry is suspicious that his dentist has converted to Judaism to get away with telling Jewish jokes.
154	20	"The Millennium"	Andy Ackerman	Jennifer Crittenden	May 1, 1997	820	29.30
Kramer makes plans for New Year's 2000 and wonders what the future may be like. Elaine gets bad service at a store and begins shopping at a similar store. George tries to get himself fired from the Yankees. Jerry learns he is on his girlfriend's speed dial.
155	21	"The Muffin Tops"	Andy Ackerman	Spike Feresten	May 8, 1997	821	31.09
Elaine tells Kramer that stories he sold to Peterman were published in his autobiography. Elaine's old boss, Mr. Lippman, steals her idea for a muffin shop. Kramer then decides to create a "Peterman Reality Tour." Jerry starts shaving his chest hair for his new girlfriend. George pretends to be a tourist in order to go out with a woman.
156	22	"The Summer of George"	Andy Ackerman	Alec Berg & Jeff Schaffer	May 15, 1997	822	29.80
George decides to take the summer off when he learns he can receive severance pay. Jerry and Kramer attend the Tony Awards where Jerry brings a date who he fears has a boyfriend at home. Kramer fills seats at the awards and pretends to accept an award with a cast ensemble.

== Reception ==
The review aggregator website Rotten Tomatoes reported an 86% approval rating with an average rating of 9/10, based on 7 critic reviews.
