= Seinfeld season 9 =

Seinfeld
- Season 9
- DVD cover
- Showrunner: Jerry Seinfeld
- Starring: Jerry Seinfeld; Julia Louis-Dreyfus; Michael Richards; Jason Alexander
- No. of episodes: 24

Release
- Original network: NBC
- Original release: September 25, 1997 – May 14, 1998

Season chronology
- ← Previous; Season 8

The ninth and final season of Seinfeld began airing on September 25, 1997, and concluded on May 14, 1998 on NBC.

== Production ==
Seinfeld was produced by Castle Rock Entertainment and aired on NBC in the United States. The executive producers were Jerry Seinfeld (showrunner), George Shapiro, Howard West, Alex Berg, and for the final episode Larry David, with Tom Gammill and Max Pross as supervising producers. Bruce Kirschbaum was the executive consultant. This season was directed by Andy Ackerman.

The series was set predominantly in an apartment block on New York City's Upper West Side; the ninth season was shot and mostly filmed in CBS Studio Center in Studio City, California. The show features Jerry Seinfeld as himself, and a host of Jerry's friends and acquaintances, which include George Costanza, Elaine Benes, and Cosmo Kramer, portrayed by Jason Alexander, Julia Louis-Dreyfus and Michael Richards, respectively.

== Episodes ==
No. overall	No. in season	Title	Directed by	Written by	Original release date	Prod. code	US viewers (millions)
157	1	"The Butter Shave"	Andy Ackerman	Alec Berg & Jeff Schaffer & David Mandel	September 25, 1997	901	37.78
Kramer starts using butter as shaving cream. George uses a cane when he applies for an interview at a sporting goods firm, where everyone thinks he is disabled. Jerry is annoyed that Kenny Bania is a "time slot hit." Elaine goes to Europe with David Puddy.
158	2	"The Voice"	Andy Ackerman	Alec Berg & Jeff Schaffer & David Mandel	October 2, 1997	902	30.93
George's employer learns that George is not actually handicapped. Jerry creates a voice in response to the sounds his girlfriend's stomach makes. Kramer hires a New York University intern to be his assistant. Elaine begins seeing Puddy again.
159	3	"The Serenity Now"	Andy Ackerman	Steve Koren	October 9, 1997	903	30.15
George's father is given a phrase to say whenever his blood pressure rises to a certain level. Elaine receives a french kiss from Mr. Lippman's 13-year-old son. Jerry's girlfriend gives his New York Knicks tickets away. Kramer installs a screen door over his apartment door.
160	4	"The Blood"	Andy Ackerman	Dan O'Keefe	October 16, 1997	904	31.45
Jerry receives three pints of Kramer's blood after having a run-in with a knife. Elaine wants to prove to her friend that she is not irresponsible. George concludes that television and food create a better sex life.
161	5	"The Junk Mail"	Andy Ackerman	Spike Feresten	October 30, 1997	905	30.24
Kramer refuses to receive mail from the postal service. Jerry gets a new car from a childhood friend after doing a car show for his dealership. Elaine thinks she has met her dream man, despite getting back with Puddy, and tries to juggle both relationships. George's parents cut him loose.
162	6	"The Merv Griffin Show"	Andy Ackerman	Bruce Eric Kaplan	November 6, 1997	906	31.64
Kramer discovers an old stage set from The Merv Griffin Show. Jerry's new girlfriend collects old toys but asks Jerry not to play with them. Elaine must deal with a "sidler" at work. George's girlfriend becomes disgusted when he accidentally runs over pigeons with his car.
163	7	"The Slicer"	Andy Ackerman	Story by : Gregg Kavet & Andy Robin & Darin Henry; Teleplay by : Gregg Kavet & Andy Robin	November 13, 1997	907	32.77
Jerry tries to break up with a dermatologist (Marcia Cross) when she becomes tiresome after constantly talking about "saving lives". Kramer purchases a meat slicer which Elaine uses to slip food under the door for the starving cat of her neighbor who is out of town. George tries to have himself airbrushed out of a photo his new boss has.
164	8	"The Betrayal"	Andy Ackerman	David Mandel & Peter Mehlman	November 20, 1997	908	33.99
Elaine drags Jerry and George to India where they attend the wedding of Sue Ellen Mischke. Kramer learns that a friend wishes he would drop dead. (All of the events in the episode occur backwards with the end at the beginning and vice versa.)
165	9	"The Apology"	Andy Ackerman	Jennifer Crittenden	December 11, 1997	909	30.47
Jerry's girlfriend Melissa prefers to be naked while in the house. Elaine learns her co-worker hates germs coming from Elaine but can tolerate everyone else's. Kramer decides to make changes to his shower routine. George expects an apology from a friend who is in Alcoholics Anonymous.
166	10	"The Strike"	Andy Ackerman	Dan O'Keefe and Alec Berg & Jeff Schaffer	December 18, 1997	910	30.79
Kramer gets word that he can return to a bagel shop he worked at previously after a 12-year absence. Jerry, Elaine and George attend a Chanukah party where Jerry sets up a date with a "two faced" woman and Elaine uses her "fake" number to avoid one. Kramer brings a renewed interest in Festivus, a holiday George's father invented when George was younger.
167	11	"The Dealership"	Andy Ackerman	Steve Koren	January 8, 1998	911	32.86
Jerry plans on buying a new car from Puddy who has been elevated to car salesman. He also hopes that Puddy and Elaine will get back together so he will get a better discount. Kramer and another salesman see how far they can test drive a car on an empty gas tank. A hungry George comes up with an idea to implicate a mechanic.
168	12	"The Reverse Peephole"	Andy Ackerman	Spike Feresten	January 15, 1998	912	33.48
Kramer and Newman plan to reverse the peepholes on their doors which gets Newman an eviction notice. Jerry decides to go wallet-less. Elaine has trouble finding a coat that looks like Puddy's for another friend. George must pay for a party gift alone.
169	13	"The Cartoon"	Andy Ackerman	Bruce Eric Kaplan	January 29, 1998	913	33.19
Elaine obsesses over a cartoon in The New Yorker. Kramer decides to take a vow of silence. Elaine and Kramer believe that George's girlfriend looks a lot like Jerry. Jerry is at odds with Sally Weaver, Susan's former roommate.
170	14	"The Strongbox"	Andy Ackerman	Story by : Dan O'Keefe & Billy Kimball; Teleplay by : Dan O'Keefe	February 5, 1998	914	31.63
Jerry buys cufflinks that once belonged to Jerry Lewis. Kramer gets a strongbox. Elaine has a secret crush. George tries to break up with his girlfriend but she refuses.
171	15	"The Wizard"	Andy Ackerman	Steve Lookner	February 26, 1998	915	30.51
Jerry gives his father an electronic organizer for his birthday. Jerry and George debate about the race of Elaine's new boyfriend which triggers her curiosity. Kramer plans on running for president of Morty and Helen's condo association. George lies to the Rosses about owning a house in the Hamptons.
172	16	"The Burning"	Andy Ackerman	Jennifer Crittenden	March 19, 1998	916	30.92
Elaine learns that Puddy is religious. Jerry does not recognize his girlfriend's voice on the phone when she leaves an "It's me" message. Kramer and Mickey act out sick conditions for medical students. George's ideas at a Kruger meeting are widely accepted, but his subsequent ideas are not as well received.
173	17	"The Bookstore"	Andy Ackerman	Story by : Spike Feresten and Darin Henry & Marc Jaffe; Teleplay by : Spike Feresten	April 9, 1998	917	29.60
Jerry spots Uncle Leo shoplifting. Elaine makes out with a co-worker at a party and lies to cover it up. Kramer and Newman acquire a rickshaw from Hong Kong and need someone to pull it. George takes a book into the bathroom at a bookstore and is forced to purchase it.
174	18	"The Frogger"	Andy Ackerman	Story by : Gregg Kavet & Andy Robin and Steve Koren & Dan O'Keefe; Teleplay by : Gregg Kavet & Andy Robin	April 23, 1998	918	30.66
After a childhood pizzeria goes out of business, George tries to save his high score from a Frogger game by purchasing the machine. Kramer scares Jerry after telling him about a serial killer, "The Lopper." Elaine tires of company birthdays and tries to avoid them by calling in sick.
175	19	"The Maid"	Andy Ackerman	Story by : Alec Berg & David Mandel & Jeff Schaffer and Kit Boss & Peter Mehlman; Teleplay by : Alec Berg & David Mandel & Jeff Schaffer	April 30, 1998	919	33.32
Jerry hires a maid whom he then starts sleeping with. Elaine discovers she has 57 messages on her answering machine when Kramer's food-order service tries to fax her. George tries to get a nickname but a co-worker gets the one he chose instead.
176	20	"The Puerto Rican Day"	Andy Ackerman	Alec Berg, Jennifer Crittenden, Spike Feresten, Bruce Eric Kaplan, Gregg Kavet, Steve Koren, David Mandel, Dan O'Keefe, Andy Robin, Jeff Schaffer	May 7, 1998	920	38.78
The gang leaves a New York Mets game early in order to beat the traffic but is blocked by a Puerto Rican day parade. Each goes his/her separate ways in order to get home.
177	21	"The Clip Show" "The Chronicle"	Andy Ackerman	Darin Henry	May 14, 1998	921	58.53
178	22	"The Clip Show" "The Chronicle"	Andy Ackerman	Darin Henry	May 14, 1998	922	58.53
A retrospective on the past 9 years of Seinfeld leading into the series finale.
179	23	"The Finale"	Andy Ackerman	Larry David	May 14, 1998	923	76.26
180	24	"The Finale"	Andy Ackerman	Larry David	May 14, 1998	924	76.26
NBC executives decide to add Jerry and George's pilot, Jerry to the fall season. The two plan on leaving for Los Angeles and decide to vacation in Paris with Elaine and Kramer before they leave. The plans are canceled, however, when their plane experiences turbulence and is forced to land for repairs. Jerry, George, Elaine and Kramer are arrested for breaking a Good Samaritan law in Latham County, Massachusetts, and are put on trial in addition for being terrible people.

== Reception ==
The review aggregator website Rotten Tomatoes reported a 61% approval rating with an average rating of 5.9/10, based on 23 critic reviews. The website's critics consensus reads, "In its final season, the cynical show about nothing goes out defiantly on its own terms – even if means alienating fans who may have wanted things to end differently."
