= The Maid (Seinfeld) =

- Seinfeld episode
- Episode no.: Season 9 Episode 19
- Directed by: Andy Ackerman
- Story by: Alec Berg & David Mandel & Jeff Schaffer and Kit Boss & Peter Mehlman
- Teleplay by: Alec Berg & David Mandel & Jeff Schaffer
- Production code: 919
- Original air date: April 30, 1998

Guest appearances
- Angela Featherstone as Cindy; Daniel Von Bargen as Kruger; Anthony Crivello as Maxwell; Markus Flanagan as Charles; Sam Whipple as Phone Guy #1; Kyle Colerider-Kruph as Phone Guy #2; Steve Franken as Brendan; Davenia McFadden as Coco; Damon Jones as Watkins; Chip Chinery as Co-Worker #1; Colin McClean as Co-Worker #2; Anthony Mangano as Fireman; Ruth Cohen as Ruthie Cohen (uncredited); Rick Corcoran as Answering Machine (voice) (uncredited); Thomas Dekker as Bobby (voice) (uncredited)

Episode chronology
← Previous "The Frogger"	Next → "The Puerto Rican Day"
- Seinfeld season 9

"The Maid" is the 175th episode of the NBC sitcom Seinfeld. This was the 19th episode of the ninth and final season. It aired on April 30, 1998. In this episode, Jerry hires a maid and ends up having a sexual relationship with her, George tries to get people to give him a good nickname, and Elaine falls into a chain of phone problems after Kramer subscribes her phone number to an incessant fax service.

== Plot ==
Jerry hires a maid, Cindy, with whom he then starts having sex. On one visit Cindy leaves without getting around to any work, but still takes the money he left for her, which Jerry realizes could be considered prostitution. He stops leaving money for Cindy, and when she demands money on her next visit, he points out that she didn't do any work. Angered, she walks out on the job and the relationship. Cindy's boss Maxwell demands that Jerry pay Cindy for this last visit, threatening to publicly expose Jerry's fastidious cleaning requests and make Cindy pay for the visit. Wanting to avoid trouble, Jerry agrees to pay her.

George tries to get a nickname at work, T-Bone, by ordering a T-bone steak for lunch and talking about how much he likes T-bones, but a co-worker makes the same order and gets the nickname instead. George tries reasoning with T-Bone to get the nickname. When this doesn't work, George throws a fit, yelling, crying, and flailing around with a banana in his hand until T-bone agrees to surrender the nickname. However, after witnessing this scene, his coworkers nickname George "Koko" in reference to the gorilla who was taught sign language. George hires a woman named Coco as vice president of acquisitions; Kruger states there should not be two Koko/Cocos, and George goes back to being George again, much to his satisfaction. However, when Coco mentions her Gammy, Kruger is inspired to give George the nickname "Gammy".

Kramer signs up to receive restaurant menus by fax with a service called "Now We're Cookin'", but uses Elaine's phone number, mistakenly thinking she had a fax machine. Annoyed by the nonstop calls from the fax service, Elaine changes her phone number and gets one with the new 646 area code, so callers have to dial 1-646 in addition to her seven digit number. She gives her number to a prospective date, but when he sees the 646 area code, he says he is already in a relationship and walks off. When her neighbor Mrs. Krantz dies, Elaine gets Mrs. Krantz’s old 212 number. Krantz's grandson Bobby keeps calling the number, because his parents are reluctant to break it to him that his grandmother is dead. Elaine pretends to be Bobby's grandmother for a few weeks; then, fed up with his parents' irresponsibility, she tells Bobby she is dying and hangs up. Bobby dials 9-1-1 and firefighters beat down Elaine's door.

Kramer's girlfriend moves downtown, leading him to struggle with the drawbacks of a "long-distance relationship". He breaks up with her when she refuses to move, and he gets lost on the Lower East Side. Jerry goes to pick him up, spots Cindy, and slows down to give her her money. A patrolling NYPD unit mistakes her for a prostitute and arrests them. Still waiting for Jerry, Kramer is approached by Maxwell and talked into a maid job.

== Production ==
According to Alec Berg, Jeff Schaffer, and David Mandel, who wrote the teleplay for the episode based on a story by themselves, Kit Boss, and Peter Mehlman, "The Maid" was the last "normal" episode of Seinfeld, since "The Puerto Rican Day" was scripted as a writers' jam involving the entire Seinfeld writing staff and filmed entirely on location, "The Clip Show" was a clip show and largely a retrospective of the series's history, and "The Finale" was not written by any of the regular writing staff. As such, it became a sort of dumping ground for all of the writers' favorite ideas that they had been unable to work into an episode yet, since the writers all saw it as their last chance. One of the working titles for this episode was "The Long-Distance Relationship".

The story of George wanting a nickname was contributed by Kit Boss. Initially the story developed much differently: Irritated by another employee getting the "T-bone" nickname, George was to issue a stern office-wide memo forbidding the use of nicknames, but misspells his own name in the signature as "Gorge". The office staff would then assign him the nickname "Gorge". In an attempt to dispel the unwelcome nickname, George would get a copy of his birth certificate, only to discover that due to his father misspelling his name in the same exact way, his legal name is in fact "Gorge Costanza". Jerry Seinfeld vetoed this idea, arguing that "Gorge" was essentially just a fat joke. The writers replaced it with George being nicknamed "Koko", which was Seinfeld writer Steve Koren's nickname in the offices, due to the gorilla-like haircut he had at the time.

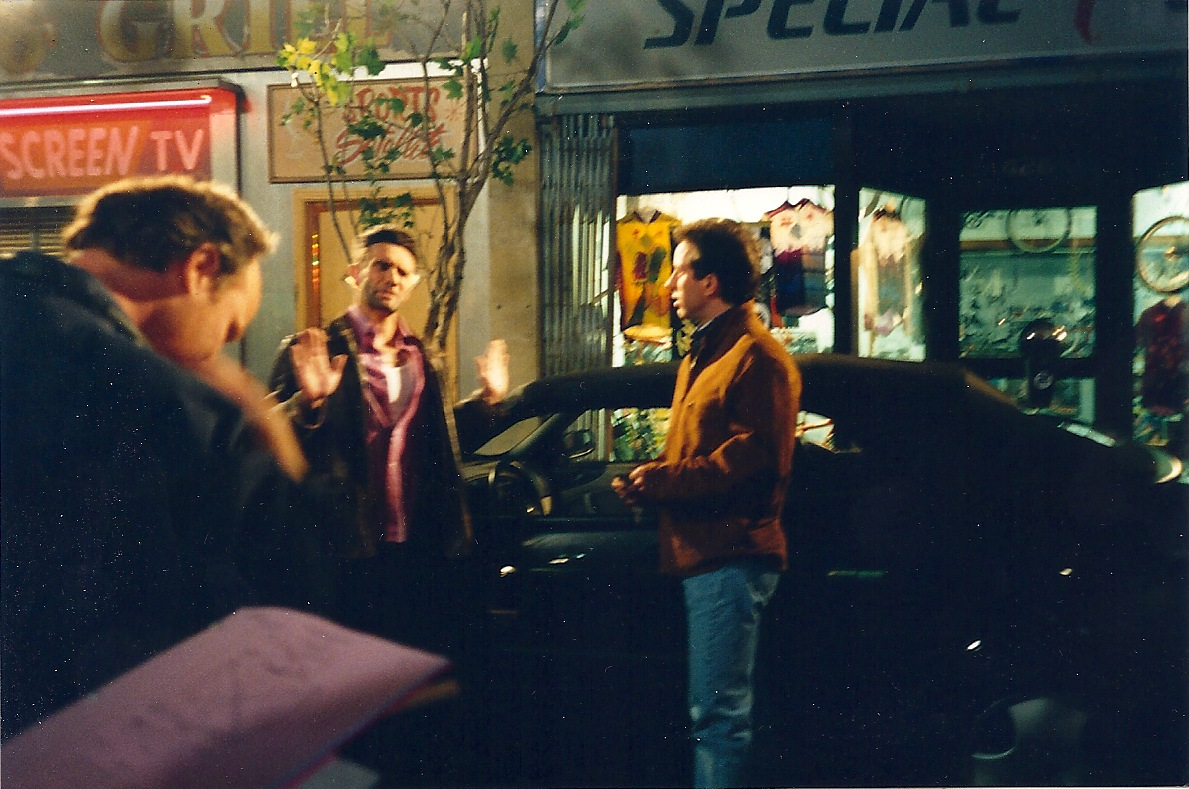
Anthony Crivello and Jerry Seinfeld filming the episode on set in Los Angeles.

The Jerry/Cindy story was inspired by the real-life Jerry Seinfeld's relationship with his trainer, who he began dating. Seinfeld had commented to the other writers about the oddity of paying a woman to come to his house while also carrying on a sexual relationship with her. Seinfeld's voice was hoarse during filming, to the point where some of his dialogue had to be re-recorded in post-production.

The phone story grew out of the office trend where employees' phone numbers are almost inevitably mistaken by some other employee for a fax number. Elaine deleting a message from George, though it occupies just a few seconds of screen time, was originally intended to be an entire story. The writers wanted to satirize the practice of deleting messages from friends without listening to them, with the intent of simply calling the person back, but couldn't think up a way to develop the idea.

Jerry's line, "stay alive, no matter what occurs, I will find you," is an allusion to the 1992 film The Last of the Mohicans.

When Cindy tells George that one of the girls at the maid service she works at is named Coco, she mentions "That girl's all right." This is a reference to "The Dealership", where Jerry and Puddy discuss Koko, the gorilla that can do sign language, and Puddy says, "That chimp's all right." Mandel later commented, "I don't know why we thought that line was funny."

The table read for "The Maid" was held on March 8, 1998, with filming taking place on March 9, 10, and 12. Sequences which were filmed for the episode but deleted before broadcast include George and Jerry recounting George's first failed attempt at getting a nickname ("Crash" Costanza), Kramer saying he and Madeline did a jigsaw puzzle together over the phone, and Maxwell telling Jerry that the maids at his service are considered the best because they're willing to do anything.
