= Saving Face =

Saving Face may refer to:

- "Saving face", an idiom for preserving one's honor or prestige; see Face (sociological concept)
- Saving Face (2004 film), a 2004 American romantic comedy drama
- Saving Face (2012 film), a 2012 documentary short film
- "Saving Face", a season 2 episode of The Casagrandes
- "Saving Face" (The Closer), an episode of The Closer
- "Saving Face" (Kappa Mikey), an episode of Kappa Mikey
- "Saving Face" (Law & Order: Criminal Intent), an episode of Law & Order: Criminal Intent
- Saving Face, a book by Gregg Kavet and Andy Robin
- "Saving Faces", a song by Orgy from Vapor Transmission
