= The Michael Richards Show =

American television sitcom

- Genre: Sitcom
- Created by: Spike Feresten; Gregg Kavet; Michael Richards; Andy Robin
- Starring: Michael Richards; William Devane; Bill Cobbs; Amy Farrington; Tim Meadows
- Composer: Christopher Tyng
- Country of origin: United States
- Original language: English
- No. of seasons: 1
- No. of episodes: 8 (+1 unaired pilot)

Production
- Executive producers: Spike Feresten; Gregg Kavet; Andy Robin; Michael Richards
- Camera setup: Multi-camera
- Running time: 30 minutes
- Production companies: Castle Rock Entertainment; Warner Bros. Television

Original release
- Network: NBC
- Release: October 24 – December 19, 2000

The Michael Richards Show is an American television sitcom created by Spike Feresten, Gregg Kavet, Andy Robin and Michael Richards that was produced by Castle Rock Entertainment and Warner Bros. Television and aired on NBC from October 24 to December 19, 2000, for eight episodes. The show stars Richards as socially awkward but talented private detective Vic Nardozza, who gets the job done despite his unusual methods.

== Synopsis ==
The show revolved around Vic Nardozza (Michael Richards), an inept and clumsy private investigator working for McKay Investigative Services. Throughout the show, misunderstandings and poor decisions get in the way of the cases, but Nardozza always ends up getting the job done.

== Cast ==
- Michael Richards as Vic Nardozza
- William Devane as Brady McKay
- Bill Cobbs as Jack
- Amy Farrington as Stacey Devers
- Tim Meadows as Kevin Blakely

== Production ==
Following the conclusion of his previous show, Seinfeld, Michael Richards re-teamed with Andy Robin, Gregg Kavet, and Spike Feresten, three former Seinfeld writers/producers, in a comedy caper about a private eye in Los Angeles. When originally conceived, Richards wanted to differentiate his character from Kramer, the role he immortalized on Seinfeld. When test audiences' expectations for Richards were not met, NBC decided that the character would share characteristics with his previous role. The character Nardozza was named after Richards' own mother, Phyllis Nardozzi. By June 13, 2000, Ron Zimmerman had been named as a co-executive producer for the series.

The Michael Richards Show premiered on NBC on October 24, 2000, to 13.19 million viewers according to Nielsen Media Research. On November 8, following the second episode's broadcast, co-creator Spike Feresten departed the series over "creative differences" with the series' crew. A decline in ratings following the first episode's broadcast led NBC to cancel the series after eight episodes.

In a 2015 interview, co-star William Devane recalled that making the show was "a nightmare", blaming both Richards' actions as the star of the show and the lack of a capable showrunner for its failure.

== Episodes ==
No.	Title	Directed by	Written by	Original release date	Prod. code	Viewers (millions)
0	"Pilot"	John Fortenberry	Spike Feresten and Michael Richards and Gregg Kavet & Andy Robin	Unaired	245301	N/A
1	"Mr. Irresistible"	Asaad Kelada	Gregg Kavet & Andy Robin	October 24, 2000	245302	13.19
2	"Simplification"	Andrew Tsao	Ron Corcillo & A.J. Poulin	October 31, 2000	245304	9.96
3	"Discrimination"	Shelley Jensen	Dan Greaney	November 14, 2000	245306	7.91
4	"The Identity Loan"	Asaad Kelada	Spike Feresten & Chuck Sklar	November 21, 2000	245303	7.32
5	"The Nursing Home"	Asaad Kelada	Brian Kelley	November 28, 2000	245307	7.44
6	"It's Only Personal"	Sam Simon	Ron Zimmerman	December 5, 2000	245305	6.93
7	"USA Toy"	Asaad Kelada	Chuck Sklar	December 12, 2000	245308	6.85
8	"The Consultant"	Bryan Gordon	Mark Driscoll	December 19, 2000	245309	5.63

== Reception ==
The show received generally negative reviews from critics. Variety reviewer Phil Gallo described the premiere episode as "thoroughly unfunny" and that "the humor is lacking at every turn in this series, and the wit is practically nonexistent." People reviewer Tom Gliatto compared the difficulty in Seinfeld stars moving onto solo projects to "stepping onto a toboggan loaded with tubes of nitroglycerine and then hurtling down a sheet of rock." Gliatto stated that the comedy the series incorporated "isn't enough to fill out a show" and said that the series "is off to a flat-footed start." Entertainment Weekly reviewer Ken Tucker wrote, "The Michael Richards Show isn't merely unamusing; it's shockingly incompetent."
