= Bruce Eric Kaplan =

American cartoonist

Bruce Eric Kaplan (born 1964 or 1965) is an American cartoonist and satirist whose single-panel cartoons frequently appear in The New Yorker. His cartoons are known for their signature simple style and often ironic or dark humor. Kaplan is also a screenwriter and has worked on Seinfeld and on Six Feet Under. Kaplan wove his New Yorker cartooning into Seinfeld with the episode, "The Cartoon." He graduated from Wesleyan University and studied there with Professor Jeanine Basinger.

== Biography ==
Kaplan joined the crew of Six Feet Under during the first season in 2001, as a supervising producer. He scripted two episodes of the first season, "The Foot" and "The New Person." He was promoted to co-executive producer for the second season in 2002 and wrote another two episodes, "The Invisible Woman" and "The Secret." He remained a co-executive producer for the third season, in 2003, and wrote an episode entitled "The Trap". He was promoted to executive producer for the fourth season, in 2004, and wrote another episode, "The Dare." He served as executive producer during the fifth and final season and wrote his last episode "The Silence." Kaplan wrote seven episodes for the series. In 2012, he became a co-executive producer on, and wrote for, the HBO series Girls. He is of Jewish descent.

== Books ==
- No One You Know: A Collection of Cartoons (1999) Simon & Schuster ISBN 0-684-85919-X
- The Cat That Changed My Life: 50 Cats Talk Candidly About How They Became Who They Are (2002) Simon & Schuster ISBN 0-7432-1944-9
- This Is A Bad Time: A Collection of Cartoons (2004) Simon & Schuster ISBN 0-7432-5218-7
- Every Person on the Planet: An Only Somewhat Anxiety-Filled Tale for the Holidays (2005) Simon & Schuster ISBN 0-7432-7470-9
- Someone Farted (2007)
- Edmund and Rosemary Go to Hell: A Story We All Really Need Now More Than Ever (2007) Simon & Schuster ISBN 1-4165-4549-2
- I love you, I hate you, I'm hungry. 2010.
- Monsters Eat Whiny Children (2010)
- Everything Is Going to Be Okay: A Book for You or Someone Like You (2011) Simon & Schuster ISBN 978-1-4165-5692-3
- I Was a Child: A Memoir (2015) Blue Rider Press ISBN 978-0-3991-6951-9
- They Went Another Way (2024) Henry Holt & Co. ISBN 978-1-2503-7033-4

== Six Feet Under episodes ==
- The Foot (2001)
- The New Person (2001)
- The Invisible Woman (2002)
- The Secret (2002)
- The Trap (2003)
- The Dare (2004)
- The Silence (2005)

== Seinfeld episodes ==
- "The Merv Griffin Show" (1997)
- "The Cartoon" (1998)
- "The Puerto Rican Day" (1998) (with Alec Berg, Jeff Schaffer, Jennifer Crittenden, Spike Feresten, Steve Koren, David Mandel, Dan O'Keefe, Gregg Kavet & Andy Robin)
