= The Nap =

- Seinfeld episode
- Episode no.: Season 8 Episode 18
- Directed by: Andy Ackerman
- Written by: Gregg Kavet & Andy Robin
- Production code: 818
- Original air date: April 10, 1997

Guest appearances
- Stephen Lee as Conrad; Vince Grant as Hal; Richard Herd as Wilhelm; Angelo Tiffe as Delivery Man; JoNell Kennedy as Secretary; Mik Scriba as Bomb Squad Guy; Terry Rhoads as Father; Sid Newman as Old Man; Kevin Keckeisen as Brian; Kyle Sullivan as Son; Larry David as George Steinbrenner (voice) (uncredited)

Episode chronology
← Previous "The English Patient"	Next → "The Yada Yada"
- Seinfeld season 8

"The Nap" is the 152nd episode of the sitcom Seinfeld. This was the 18th episode for the eighth season. It aired on NBC on April 10, 1997. In this episode, Elaine's boyfriend gets her an ergonomic mattress, Jerry has his kitchen redesigned by a contractor who annoys him by asking for his preference on every aspect, and George takes naps under his desk at work. Larry David returned as recurring character George Steinbrenner, whom he would play in two other episodes near the end of this season and in the show's final episode.

== Plot ==
Kramer takes up swimming. Finding the local pool too crowded, he begins swimming in the East River. On their first date, Hal tells Elaine he has been very careful about his back since injuring it. Later, he sends her an ergonomic mattress. Assuming he got it for himself, she is offended at the presumption of sex after one date and gives the mattress to Kramer. When she confronts Hal, he tells her that he meant the mattress for her use and even had it custom-made for her back. Charmed by this, she retrieves the mattress from Kramer, but he has fouled it with the stench of the East River. When he notices Kramer and the mattress have the same stench, and learns Kramer has the key to Elaine's apartment (to get the mattress), Hal thinks Elaine has been having sex with Kramer. Hal confronts Kramer privately to clear up his relationship with Elaine, and Kramer mentions that swimming in the East River has done wonders for his back. Hal tries it out and tells his back doctor, who prescribes swimming in the East River to all his patients, including Elaine, who threw her back out trying to move the mattress. As a result, Kramer finds the East River as unacceptably crowded as the local pool.

Jerry is getting new kitchen cabinets. The contractor, Conrad, is excessively accommodating, asking Jerry for his preference on every aspect of the project. Weary of his questions, Jerry leaves the apartment and tells Conrad to do the cabinets however he pleases. Conrad builds a large and obtrusive addition to the kitchen that Jerry loves but all his friends hate. Jerry asks Conrad to put his kitchen back the way it was, disgusting Conrad with his fickleness.

George likes to take naps at work, but his office has large windows looking into the hall, so he naps under his desk. George has Conrad modify his desk with a bed and space for an alarm clock. Steinbrenner visits George's office while George is napping and waits for him to return. Not wanting to expose his napping space, George gets Jerry to phone in a bomb threat in an effort to get Steinbrenner out of his office; instead, Steinbrenner hides under the desk. However, he assumes George was also hiding from the bomb. Steinbrenner puts George in charge of the "terrorist's" demand of a fitted hat day. George has Jerry call back and renounce the demand, then disconnects the call before Jerry can issue further demands. Fearing a reprisal due to the forced disconnect, when Steinbrenner hears George's alarm clock ticking, he thinks it's a bomb, and calls in the bomb squad, who dismantle George's desk. Craving the coziness of his desk bed, George takes a nap in Jerry's cupboards.

== Production ==
According to writer Gregg Kavet, the idea for the George story came from the fact that a former co-worker would take naps underneath his desk so that he wouldn't be seen slacking off. The character Conrad was based on Stan Ascough, Seinfeld's prop master for almost the entire run of the show. Writers Gregg Kavet and Andy Robin recalled, "[Stan Ascough] would offer you many suggestions for each of these props. If you wanted a spoon, he'd put 20 spoons in front of you and ask you to pick. Stan had a hard time just making the choice himself, and he wanted to please so hard ... It's kind of just one more decision to make. As the writers, it sometimes was a pain to make, and certainly Jerry [Seinfeld] felt ... he didn't have time to make all these decisions for Stan." They added that, while they didn't know if Ascough ever realized he was the basis for Conrad, some time after the episode filmed he seemed to recognize that there was a negative side to his offering so many options.

The various mattress store pun names were contributed by another Seinfeld writer, Alec Berg.

Larry David returned to the show for the first time since his departure at the end of season 7, solely to provide the voice of George Steinbrenner. The crew were concerned that David would not take well to having to read Steinbrenner's lines from a script, since in previous seasons he held the final say on all scripts and ad-libbed much of Steinbrenner's dialogue. However, David raised no objections to the script, though he later remarked that the experience was an odd one. The bomb squad was portrayed by members of the real Los Angeles bomb squad.

The scene with Kramer diving into the East River was filmed on a studio set with a dock and a blue screen to provide the East River and the New York skyline. As with "The Friar's Club", the shots of Kramer actually swimming were filmed at a Universal Studios water tank.
