= The Puerto Rican Day =

- Seinfeld episode
- Episode no.: Season 9 Episode 20
- Directed by: Andy Ackerman
- Written by: Alec Berg, Jennifer Crittenden, Spike Feresten, Bruce Eric Kaplan, Gregg Kavet, Steve Koren, David Mandel, Dan O'Keefe, Andy Robin, Jeff Schaffer
- Production code: 920
- Original air date: May 7, 1998

Guest appearances
- Mario Joyner as Lamar; Dayton Callie as Cabbie; James Karen as Mr. Canterman; Helen Carey as Mrs. Christine Nyhart; Yul Vazquez as Bob; John Paragon as Cedric; Jenica Bergere as Leslie; Monica Allison as Gail; Marcelo Tubert as Father; Armando Molina as Amigo; Tom Agna as Gary; Tom Dahlgren as Priest; Bert Rosario as Man; Raoul N. Rizik as Parade Goer; Scott Conte as Sketch Guy; Mimi Cozzens as Mrs. Canterman; Alison Martin as Lucy; Marc Hirschfeld as Ellis; Chip Heller as Policeman

Episode chronology
← Previous "The Maid"	Next → "The Clip Show"
- Seinfeld season 9

"The Puerto Rican Day" is the 176th episode of the NBC sitcom Seinfeld. It aired on May 7, 1998, and was the 20th episode of the ninth and final season. It was the show's second-highest-rated episode of all time, with an average of 38.8 million viewers, only behind the series finale. The episode aired one week before the two-part clip show and the two-part series finale aired. It was a rare late-series return to a "plot about nothing" style and filmed in real-time, a format more often seen in early seasons. The episode follows the cast's misadventures as they try to escape from the traffic surrounding the Puerto Rican Day Parade.

This episode of Seinfeld has more writer credits (ten) than any other episode. As co-creator Larry David was returning to write the finale, this was the final episode for the active "after Larry David" writing staff and thus was a group effort.

Because of controversy surrounding a scene in which Cosmo Kramer accidentally burns and then stomps on the Puerto Rican flag, NBC apologized and had it banned from airing on the network again. Also, it was not initially part of the syndicated package. In the summer of 2002, the episode started to appear with the flag-burning sequence intact. In 2023, the episode was available to watch along with the rest of the series on Netflix.

== Plot ==
Jerry, George, Elaine, and Kramer head back to Manhattan after leaving a Mets game early, but have an altercation with a driver in a maroon Volkswagen Golf. George boasts about the comment ("That's gotta hurt!") he made during a new movie about the Hindenburg disaster titled Blimp. As they approach Fifth Avenue, traffic is blocked by the annual Puerto Rican Day Parade. They head towards a one-way side street, but are blocked by the maroon Golf, whose driver refuses to let them cross over.

Elaine gets out of the car and gets a taxi. George leaves the car to see the movie Blimp in a nearby theater and repeat his funny comment for a new audience. When George makes the comment, nobody laughs. George blames a man with a laser pointer for upstaging him, and derisively calls him a prop comic. The man retaliates by shining the laser on him.

Jerry makes an apologetic wave to the maroon Golf driver, who lets him by. As they pass, Jerry taunts the driver, only to find himself blocked by the taxi Elaine is in. George returns to the car, but the laser pointer is still shining on him. George can't see the man holding the laser and worries he will go blind if it touches his eye.

Elaine tries to get past traffic by walking underneath the viewing stands, leading a group of similarly distressed people trying to find their way out to a dead end. They scream for help to the people above, but there is no access to the street from their location.

Kramer becomes desperate for a restroom and spots an apartment for sale. To access its restroom, he poses as H.E. Pennypacker, a wealthy industrialist interested in the property. While there he sees the Mets game on the television. He tells Jerry, who visits the apartment to watch, posing as Kel Varnsen.

George thinks he spots the laser guy and launches a sneak attack, grabbing and breaking what he thinks is the laser pointer only to discover it is a pen. Back outside, Kramer accidentally sets the Puerto Rican flag on fire with a sparkler, prompting Bob and Cedric and a mob of people to attack him. He runs back into the apartment. George also enters the apartment, as Art Vandelay, to wash the ink from his hands. Jerry realizes that with all three of them in the apartment, nobody is watching the car. They look out the window to find it surrounded by the mob. George tells Jerry that the Mets lost.

When the parade is finally over, Jerry finds his car stuck in a stairwell. Elaine arrives, her clothes and hair filthy. They start walking home. George still has the laser dot on his lower backside.

== Production ==
Since it was already planned for the Seinfeld finale to be written by series co-creator Larry David, the Seinfeld team decided to make "The Puerto Rican Day" the series finale for the post-David Seinfeld. Initial plans for the finale were to have all the staff write the story and script in a collaborative jam and to shoot on location in the real New York City; both of these plans were modified to some extent. The writers' jam proved to be too chaotic, so the Seinfeld writers split up into two groups working in separate rooms; one group wrote the first act, the other group wrote the second act, and then the two groups switched scripts, with each group proofreading and editing the other group's act.

The basic plot was inspired by writer David Mandel's experience getting caught in parade traffic. The Elaine subplot is a parody of The Poseidon Adventure. On the day of the shoot, director Andy Ackerman came up with the idea of Elaine kissing another member of the party. The impetus for George's subplot was a group of Seinfeld writers going to see the movie While You Were Sleeping. When one of the characters said "Do you know what love is?" Someone else in the theater shouted in reply "Yes!", making the entire audience burst into laughter.

The Seinfeld crew determined that filming in New York City would not be practical, due to the difficulty of securing the locations against intrusions by the show's fans, so the episode was instead filmed on a Universal Studios backlot. The episode was nonetheless extremely challenging to shoot, due to the need to move around the many cars and the logistics of the story all taking place on the same day (meaning the scenery and daylight needed to remain consistent in every shot). Sequences which were in the script but either not filmed or deleted before broadcast include Lamar explaining his anger at Jerry (their altercation caused the pasta Lamar was eating to slip off his lap onto his car's floor) and the crowd on the viewing stands stomping to "Rico Suave", causing food to spill onto Elaine and her companions.

== Controversy ==
The episode attracted controversy for a scene where Kramer accidentally desecrates the flag of Puerto Rico (pictured).

The scene where Kramer accidentally burns the Puerto Rican flag, an angry mob of parade-goers damages Jerry's car, and Kramer says, "It's like this every day in Puerto Rico" drew complaints from Puerto Rican activists, as well as Fernando Ferrer, the borough president of the Bronx. President of the National Puerto Rican Coalition Manuel Mirabal said that "It is unacceptable that the Puerto Rican flag be used by Seinfeld as a stage prop under any circumstances." The episode sparked angry letters and protests outside NBC's Rockefeller Center in New York. NBC formally apologized for the episode, and later pulled it from summer repeats. It was also omitted from the syndicated rerun package.

The Seinfeld cast and crew found the objections to the episode unreasonable, noting that they started before the episode even aired, seemingly based on its title alone. Jerry Seinfeld recalled that when he asked a protest leader how he could know there was anything objectionable in the episode without having seen it, he replied, "We assume that it's offensive." Two of the episode's writers, Steve Koren and David Mandel, later remarked that despite the title, the episode essentially has nothing to do with Puerto Ricans, and that they could have moved the setting to any of the many annual parades held in New York City without significantly changing the story or dialogue.

The episode was added to the syndication package with the flag-burning scene unedited in August 2002, as Sony Pictures Television, which distributes the series, said that enough time had passed since the initial furor to merit its inclusion.

The episode was declared Seinfeld’s worst by Larry Fitzmaurice in Vulture, with criticism aimed at both its racial insensitivity and perceived lack of humor.
