= The Van Buren Boys =

- Seinfeld episode
- Episode no.: Season 8 Episode 14
- Directed by: Andy Ackerman
- Written by: Darin Henry
- Production code: 814
- Original air date: February 6, 1997

Guest appearances
- Barney Martin as Morty Seinfeld; Liz Sheridan as Helen Seinfeld; Christine Taylor as Ellen; John O'Hurley as J. Peterman; Bruce Davison as Wyck; Jed Rhein as Steven Koren; Tony Colitti as Leader; David Moscow as Lomez Jr.; Yunoka Doyle as Lydia; Dublin James as Maurice; Justine Slater as Melissa; Michele Maika as Kim; Steve Hofvendahl as Man

Episode chronology
← Previous "The Comeback"	Next → "The Susie"
- Seinfeld season 8

"The Van Buren Boys" is the 148th episode of the sitcom Seinfeld. This was the 14th episode for the 8th season, originally airing on February 6, 1997. In this episode, everyone is convinced Jerry's new girlfriend, Ellen, is a loser, Elaine ghostwrites Peterman's autobiography, and Kramer and George have separate run-ins with a New York street gang whose sign is holding up eight fingers, because the gang is named for the eighth President of the United States, Martin Van Buren.

== Plot ==
At Lorenzo's Pizzeria, Kramer has an encounter with "The Van Buren Boys", a street gang. Because he is holding a garlic shaker, he unknowingly flashes their gang sign (eight fingers, as Martin Van Buren was the eighth president) and saves himself.

George interviews candidates for The Susan Ross Foundation's scholarship. He dismisses several well-qualified candidates, instead favoring an underachiever named Steven because he wants to be an architect. George envisions Steven as fulfilling his own dreams. However, emboldened by getting the scholarship, Steven raises his aspirations from architect to city planner. George responds by taking the scholarship away from Steven. Embittered by George's betrayal, Steven joins the Van Buren boys, who pressure George to give the scholarship back.

Elaine is assigned to ghostwrite Peterman's autobiography. Since his exotic adventures have already been extensively covered in the company catalog, Peterman wants the book to deal with his day-to-day life, which dismays Elaine when she learns he spends his time reclining in his surprisingly generic apartment. She tells Peterman about Kramer's encounter with the Van Buren gang. He suggests paying off Kramer so he can use the story in his autobiography. Kramer sells Peterman all his stories, but most of them turn out to be dull.

George asks Kramer how he escaped the Van Buren Boys. Elaine told Kramer that he can no longer tell his stories, since they now belong to Peterman, so Kramer tells him only that the Van Buren Boys never bother their own kind. George bluffs to the Van Buren Boys that he is a former member, but as he does not know their sign, they demand he prove membership by mugging the next passers-by. He implores Jerry's parents to pretend he is mugging them; oblivious to his situation, they walk off. George runs away from the gang.

Elaine embellishes Kramer's stories, but Peterman finds the rewrites clichéd. She tells him a real Kramer story that he finds much more interesting. No longer able to keep his friends entertained, Kramer asks for his stories back; thinking Elaine came up with the story herself, Peterman says Kramer can have them.

Jerry's girlfriend, Ellen, seems perfect in every way, but her friends thank him for dating her as if it were a charity case, and George and Kramer perform an intervention, telling Jerry she is a loser. Jerry flies his parents in to get their impression. Once he sees that his parents like Ellen, he loses his enthusiasm for her.

== Production ==
The table read for the episode was held on January 9, 1997. All of the episode's scenes which were filmed before a live studio audience were done on January 14, except for the cold open, which was filmed for "The Comeback".

The kid who gets the scholarship is named after Steve Koren, a Seinfeld writer.
