= The Merv Griffin Show (Seinfeld) =

- Seinfeld episode
- Episode no.: Season 9 Episode 6
- Directed by: Andy Ackerman
- Written by: Bruce Eric Kaplan
- Production code: 906
- Original air date: November 6, 1997

Guest appearances
- Wayne Knight as Newman; John O'Hurley as J. Peterman; Rick Hall as Vet; Jim Fowler as himself; Julia Pennington as Celia; Arabella Field as Miranda; Brent Hinkley as Lou; Wayne Wilderson as Walter; Carol Kiernan as Mother; Brandon Kaplan as Child; Ruth Cohen as Ruthie Cohen (uncredited); Jerry Stiller as Frank Costanza (uncredited); Estelle Harris as Estelle Costanza (uncredited)

Episode chronology
← Previous "The Junk Mail"	Next → "The Slicer"
- Seinfeld season 9

"The Merv Griffin Show" is the 162nd episode of the NBC sitcom Seinfeld. This was the sixth episode of the ninth and final season. It aired on November 6, 1997, and appeared on DVD ten years later. In this episode, Kramer finds the original set for The Merv Griffin Show and uses it to revive the show in his apartment, Elaine contends with a new co-worker who stealthily sidles behind her, and Jerry drugs his girlfriend so that he can play with her collection of toys.

== Plot ==
Kramer stumbles across the set of The Merv Griffin Show in a dumpster. He takes the discarded set pieces and arranges them in his apartment. He pretends the show is still on the air and acts as the host, playing the show's theme whenever "guests" come onto the set, and conducting interviews with them. Kramer adds Newman as a co-host for his "show".

George's girlfriend, Miranda, is so appalled when George runs over some pigeons with his car that she stops having sex with him. George is baffled that pigeons no longer move out of the way when he approaches. Not wanting to worsen his standing with Miranda, George swerves to avoid a pigeon, but instead hits a squirrel. Miranda pressures George into paying for surgery required to save the squirrel's life and housing it during its rehabilitation.

Jerry is intrigued with his new girlfriend Celia's vintage toy collection that she refuses to let him touch. When Celia asks for a pain reliever, he gives her a nighttime pain reliever so he can play with her toys while she sleeps. George wants in on this, so they treat Celia to a dinner of turkey (which contains tryptophan) and red wine, followed by a four-hour home movie. Once she is asleep, Jerry and George play with the toys. Elaine joins in as well. Jerry tells Kramer about this; Kramer is horrified by Jerry's actions as this might affect the standard of his talk show.

Elaine's new co-worker, Lou, moves so quietly that she can't hear him even when he's right behind her. He uses this ability to steal half the credit for her accomplishments by sidling behind her whenever she presents her work. Elaine uses his trick against him by wearing wrestling shoes, but this backfires since Lou's work is shoddy. Elaine gives Tic Tacs to Lou to make him noisy. The sound annoys J. Peterman, who says Elaine will be fired if he hears it again. Elaine suggests Lou use gum instead. Lou says the only gum he enjoys is the Mickey Mouse gumball machine which they stopped making 20 years ago. Elaine and Lou knock out Celia once again to access her gumball machine.

Concerned about his ratings, Kramer changes the format to a tabloid talk show and invites on old friend and animal expert Jim Fowler, who arrives with a hawk. On the "show", Kramer gets Jerry to admit that he has been drugging Celia. Kramer then brings out an angry Celia (who was "backstage"), and goads on their subsequent argument. George brings the squirrel onto the set to get Fowler to take it off his hands, but the hawk goes after it. The Merv Griffin set is destroyed in the process.

== Production ==
The episode's writer, Bruce Eric Kaplan, successfully pitched the story of Jerry borrowing a prized Super Ball from his girlfriend and then losing it; Jerry Seinfeld, being a toy enthusiast, adapted this idea into his girlfriend having a whole collection of vintage toys. The working title for the episode was "The Merv Griffin Set".

The exterior scenes and the shot of the hawk attacking George were filmed on October 13, 1997, with additional scenes shot on October 14, followed by a live audience taping of the scenes in Kramer's apartment on October 15. Since the real set for The Merv Griffin Show had long since been destroyed, the Seinfeld crew had to replicate it, using archival photos of the show for reference. The set for Jerry's apartment had to be dismantled to make room for the Kramer's apartment set. As a result, this is one of the few episodes in which Jerry's apartment is not seen.
