= The Money =

- Seinfeld episode
- Episode no.: Season 8 Episode 12
- Directed by: Andy Ackerman
- Written by: Peter Mehlman
- Production code: 813
- Original air date: January 16, 1997

Guest appearances
- Barney Martin as Morty Seinfeld; Liz Sheridan as Helen Seinfeld; Jerry Stiller as Frank Costanza; Estelle Harris as Estelle Costanza; John O'Hurley as J. Peterman; Sandy Baron as Jack Klompus; Sarah Silverman as Emily; Leon W. Grant as Counterperson

Episode chronology
← Previous "The Little Jerry"	Next → "The Comeback"
- Seinfeld season 8

"The Money" is the 146th episode of the sitcom Seinfeld. This was the 12th episode for the eighth season, originally airing on NBC on January 16, 1997. In a follow-up to the episode "The Cadillac", the story has Jerry traveling to Florida to buy his parents' Cadillac back from Jack Klompus. Meanwhile, Jerry's father Morty Seinfeld gets a job at The J. Peterman Company and Kramer and his girlfriend have problems sleeping together.

== Plot ==
Morty and Helen Seinfeld sell their Cadillac to Jack Klompus for $6,000 to give Jerry after he bounced a check in the previous episode. To refute their perception that he has money trouble, Jerry flies to Florida to buy the Cadillac back from Klompus, who sells it for $14,000 but insists on using it for the weekend. George is jealous of Elaine's J. Peterman stock options, so Jerry points out that George's parents must be moderately wealthy, since they never spend money. George asks about his family's history; Frank and Estelle Costanza tell him of young deaths on both sides, seemingly by genetic causes, so George anticipates a big inheritance before too long. However, the talk makes his parents realize how little time they probably have left, so they begin lavishly spending.

Klompus drives the car into a swamp. Jerry returns to Florida and pays for the damages. Klompus complains about losing his astronaut pen; Jerry responds with wisecracks. Strapped for cash and credit, Jerry sleeps in the Cadillac after Klompus refuses to let him stay over, irritated at his crack about the astronaut pen. Fearing he'll have to financially support Jerry, Morty applies for a job at J. Peterman; Elaine hires him just as Mr. Peterman returns from Myanmar. Peterman's return sends her stock options soaring, but since he is back in charge she was demoted to her old position and therefore no longer has access to them. Elaine becomes annoyed with Morty's presence at her work, so at George's suggestion she schedules a late meeting. The resulting postponement of dinnertime makes Morty crabby, so he derides Peterman's stories and walks out in the middle of the meeting. Peterman fires him.

Kramer can't sleep due to his girlfriend Emily's "Jimmy legs", so he talks her into letting him return to his own apartment after sex. Not wanting to wake his wife and son, at night Morty uses his exercise equipment on Kramer's doorknob, making Kramer think a burglar is trying to get in. He is now too terrified to sleep alone, but Emily has found she sleeps better without Kramer, who screams in his sleep. Kramer advises the Costanzas that they can't possibly spend their entire savings in New York before they die, and at his advice they move to Florida. George is upset at the prospect of losing his remaining inheritance, but ultimately is satisfied that his parents are in Florida. Kramer and Emily spend the night in the Costanzas' house since Frank and Estelle have separate beds due to Estelle's "Jimmy arms".

The Seinfelds move into a trailer, and plan to sell the Cadillac again out of spite. Frank wants to head back to New York after seeing Jerry sleeping in his car, mistaking him for a bum, but Estelle refuses.

== Production ==
Jack Klompus actor Sandy Baron did not arrive on time at the studio and was found collapsed in his car in the parking lot by production coordinator J. T. Krul, who summoned medical assistance. The Seinfeld writing staff began work on rewriting the script to insert another character in Jack Klompus's role, but Baron recovered a few days later and insisted on doing the part. The table read was held on December 15, 1996, and filming proceeded immediately after the read, continuing until December 17. Due to Baron's health issues and Jerry Stiller's scheduling conflicts, the scenes with them were shot on January 6 and 7, 1997. This episode marked Baron's final appearance as Jack Klompus.

== Reception ==
This episode was the most watched episode of this season with 37.3 million viewers.
