= The Frogger =

- Seinfeld episode
- Episode no.: Season 9 Episode 18
- Directed by: Andy Ackerman
- Story by: Gregg Kavet; Andy Robin; Steve Koren; Dan O'Keefe
- Teleplay by: Gregg Kavet; Andy Robin
- Production code: 918
- Original air date: April 23, 1998

Guest appearances
- John O'Hurley as J. Peterman; Julia Campbell as Lisi; Peter Stormare as Slippery Pete; Drake Bell as Kenny; Reuven Bar Yotam as Shlomo; Sam Shamshak as Sal; Wayne Wilderson as Walter; Mark Daniel Cade as Other Walter; Jack Esformes as Mike; Melissa Denton as Kobe; Oliver Muirhead as Lubeck; Ruth Cohen as Ruthie Cohen (uncredited)

Episode chronology
← Previous "The Bookstore"	Next → "The Maid"
- Seinfeld season 9

"The Frogger" is the 18th episode of the ninth season of the American television sitcom Seinfeld (and the 174th episode overall). It first aired on NBC in the United States on April 23, 1998. In this episode, Elaine eats a vintage cake from King Edward VIII's wedding, Jerry maintains a relationship with a woman he doesn't like in order to avoid running into a serial killer, and George tries to preserve his high score on the Frogger machine at his high school hangout.

== Plot ==
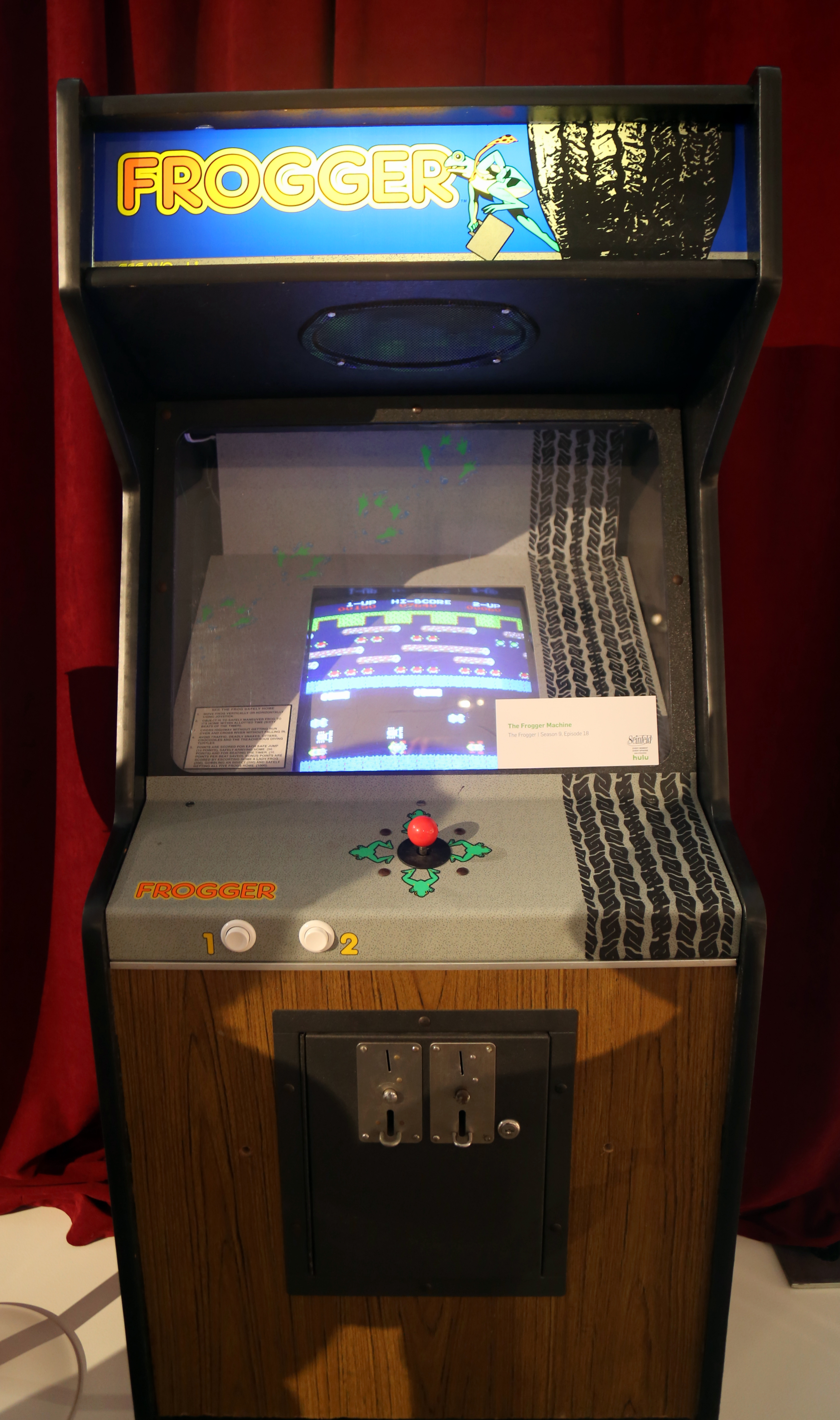
George Costanza's Frogger arcade video game from "The Frogger".

Elaine is weary of her co-workers' numerous celebrations with cake, so she calls in sick. Elaine's co-workers surprise her the next day with a cake to celebrate her return to work, but she rejects it and refuses to take part in any future celebrations. Missing the daily sugar-rush, Elaine raids her boss Peterman's mini-refrigerator. She finds a slice of cake and has a bite. Peterman reveals it is from King Edward VIII's wedding to Wallis Simpson, and he bought it for $29,000. Elaine returns to even out the cake, but is swept up by the decadence of eating cake from a royal wedding and ends up finishing it off. Elaine looks for a replacement, and Kramer points out that it resembles an Entenmann's cake. Peterman is bewildered when he has his slice of cake appraised at only $2.19. He reviews his office surveillance videotape and sees Elaine eating and dancing with the slice of cake. However, he decides the effect of such a stale cake on her digestive system is all the punishment she needs.

Kramer visits the police station, where he obtains some caution tape and hears about a serial killer who is cutting off people's heads in Riverside Park, nicknamed "The Lopper".

Jerry and George visit their nostalgic hangout since high school called Mario's Pizza Parlor, as it is closing from bankruptcy, they both order two last slices of pizzas and two last liters of grape sodas before it closes down. George then spots an old Sega/Gremlin version of the Frogger arcade cabinet that he got a record-breaking high score of over 860,000 points under the initials "GLC". George plans to buy the machine to preserve his fame, but Jerry points out that he must keep it powered up while he moves it, or it will lose its memory, erasing all high scores. George meets with Kramer, expert electrician "Slippery Pete", and truck driver Shlomo to coordinate the movement of the Frogger machine. However, Slippery Pete carelessly plays Frogger on battery power until only three minutes of power remain. The only available power source is across a busy street, and Kramer has run out of caution tape. He looks at his situation, and attempts to roll the machine on wheels across the street while trying to avoid cars, like a game of Frogger. George reaches the opposite sidewalk, but is unable to lift the 382-pound machine onto the curb. A big hauling Freightliner comes and shatters the entire arcade cabinet.

Jerry dates Elaine's friend Lisi, who finishes his sentences, but incorrectly. While he walks her home after a bad date, she tells him she lives in the Riverside Park area. To avoid the Lopper, he instead takes her back to his place, where they end up having sex. Lisi plans a weekend trip for them to Pennsylvania Dutch country, a signal that the relationship is getting serious. It is too late for a phone breakup, so Jerry goes to Lisi's apartment and breaks up with her. However, the breakup takes ten hours, so Jerry makes up with her rather than risk going out at night and running into the Lopper. The next morning, they head off on the trip to Pennsylvania Dutch country.

== Production ==
Seinfeld co-creator/star Jerry Seinfeld came up with the story of George attempting to preserve a Frogger high score himself.

This episode's many working titles include "The Cake Parties". The table read was held on February 27, 1998, with filming taking place on March 2–4.

On the day of filming the real-life Frogger sequence, Seinfeld belatedly realized that the road lines were white, when they should be yellow to match the Frogger graphics. Production designer Tom Azzari came up with the last minute fix of covering the white lines up with yellow tape. Jason Alexander performed his own stunt, diving out of the path of an oncoming truck and being showered with the shrapnel of the crushed Frogger machine as the truck ran it over. The sound effects are actual sounds from Frogger, played in time with his movements. The sound that plays shortly after the machine is smashed by a truck is the "squash" sound when the frog is hit by a vehicle during the game.

Future Nickelodeon star Drake Bell appears in this episode as the child who is first seen playing on the Frogger machine and loses due to George's unsolicited advice. Overweight J. Peterman employee Becky was played by Seinfeld writer Jennifer Crittenden in a fatsuit.

"The Frogger" is one of the few episodes in Seinfeld's later seasons to have no Kramer story. Kramer's intended storyline for the episode, in which he courts a woman he meets outside the bathroom, was filmed but cut from the episode in its entirety due to length constraints.

== The Frogger high score ==
On September 24, 2005, The Twin Galaxies Intergalactic Scoreboard offered a $1,000 cash prize to the first video game player who could break George Costanza's fictional Frogger high score of 860,630 points as portrayed in the episode. No player was able to break this mark before the December 31, 2005, deadline.

On December 22, 2009, Pat Laffaye of Westport, Connecticut, United States, scored a Frogger world record high score of 896,980 points.
