= The Slicer =

- Seinfeld episode
- Episode no.: Season 9 Episode 7
- Directed by: Andy Ackerman
- Story by: Gregg Kavet & Andy Robin & Darin Henry
- Teleplay by: Gregg Kavet & Andy Robin
- Production code: 907
- Original air date: November 13, 1997

Guest appearances
- Marcia Cross as Sara; Daniel von Bargen as Mr. Kruger; Larry B. Scott as Arthur Milano; David Moreland as Mr. Parry

Episode chronology
← Previous "The Merv Griffin Show"	Next → "The Betrayal"
- Seinfeld season 9

"The Slicer" is the 163rd episode of the NBC sitcom Seinfeld. This was the seventh episode of the ninth and final season. It first aired on November 13, 1997. In this episode, George gets a job with an incompetent industrial firm, but an old photo of his boss with him in the background and Jerry's feuding with his dermatologist girlfriend put George at risk of getting fired, while Kramer's fondness for having his own meat slicer proves to be a source of help.

== Plot ==
George gets a job with Kruger Industrial Smoothing. He sees himself in the background of a photo from a 1989 beach trip Kruger keeps in his office. On the trip, George returned from swimming to find all his things gone. Believing Kruger's two sons had taken them, George screamed at the boys and threw their boombox into the ocean. Moments later, he found his things in the water and concluded that they had been taken by the tide. Kruger demanded George pay for the boombox, and George evaded it by giving him a fake address. George fears he will be fired once Kruger recognizes him from the photo. Kramer suggests sneaking the photo out and getting George's image airbrushed out. However, the clerk mistakenly airbrushes out Kruger's image instead. The only way to restore Kruger's image is to get a photo of him without his shirt on (as he was in the photo).

Kramer is dissatisfied at the meat in his sandwiches, so he buys a meat slicer. Elaine cannot sleep because her neighbor forgot to turn off the alarm clock before leaving for Paris. To fix the problem, Kramer inserts a paper clip into a socket to blow her neighbor's circuit. Elaine hears constant meowing and realizes her neighbor's cat cannot eat because Kramer shut off power to its automatic feeder. Kramer uses the slicer to cut meat thin enough to slip under the door for the cat. Impressed, Elaine borrows the slicer. She slices her shoe heels to even them out, gets a piece of heel stuck in the slicer, and dings up the blade removing it. When Kramer picks it up, she slams the door before he can complain about the damage. Trying to get back in, he accidentally pulls off her doorknob, trapping her inside. To drown out the cat's meowing, Elaine turns up her stereo. She calls a locksmith to fix her door. A neighbor yells at her to turn down her stereo, before getting fed up and blowing Elaine's circuit, cutting off her call.

Jerry dates a doctor, Sara Sitarides, who irks him by boasting about saving lives. When Elaine tells him that Sara is a dermatologist, Jerry becomes indignant, not seeing how a dermatologist could save lives. At George's suggestion, Jerry takes Sara on a "revenge date" and mocks her profession. A man thanks Sara for saving his life from skin cancer. Elaine explains to Jerry that Sara goes to offices screening people for skin cancer. Hearing this, George sets up a screening at Kruger's so he can get a photo of Kruger with his shirt off.

Jerry apologizes to Sara to get her to agree to do the cancer screening at Kruger, and she condescendingly pats his cheek. Jerry gets hives on his jaw. Kramer suggests Sara gave it to him when she patted his cheek as revenge. Jerry goes to the screening and accuses Sara. She storms out. Seeing Kramer in a white butcher's coat (for using his slicer), Kruger mistakes him for the doctor. At George's urging, Kramer accordingly takes Sara's place. He takes a photo of Kruger, but finds a mole on Kruger's shoulder.

George gets the photo fixed and Kramer gets into dermatology. While flipping through Kramer's medical book, Jerry learns hives can be caused by benzene, commonly used in metal cleaner. Kramer had been using Jerry's hand towel with metal cleaner to clean his slicer, and gave him hives. Jerry sees another dermatologist who prescribes aloe for his hives. George suggests Kruger see a dermatologist about his mole, but Kruger reasons that because the mole looks the same in the 1989 photo, it cannot be harmful. Kruger then recounts to George that on the day of the photo, he and his sons took his things and threw them into the ocean. Enraged, George boasts about how he removed himself from the photo. Kruger is surprised but indifferent to George's deception, and keeps him as an employee.

Kramer, George and Jerry camp outside Elaine's apartment, feeding her under the door until the locksmith arrives.

== Production ==
Writers Gregg Kavet and Andy Robin wanted to give George a job again, as they had a number of work-based ideas for the character that they had come up with during his stint with the New York Yankees management. The beach photo idea was inspired by an incident that happened to Jerry Seinfeld while he was vacationing in Mexico with friends. A local offered to take an instant photo of them for a fee. The chemicals in the photo mixed incorrectly, causing Seinfeld's face to be completely blurred out. The photographer told them he would fix it, and returned minutes later with Jerry's face hand-drawn onto the photo.

Darin Henry, who joined the Seinfeld crew as a production assistant during its fourth season before writing a handful of episodes during its last two seasons, contributed Elaine's alarm clock problem. When going on trips, Henry would always worry he had forgotten to shut off his alarm, and thought it would be funny to have a story which looked at that scenario from the other perspective.

The scene where George discusses other possible jobs with Jerry was a deliberate imitation of scenes from the season two episode "The Revenge".

In the scene where she is in her bedroom folding clothes, Elaine reprises her dance from "The Little Kicks" to Foghat's "Slow Ride."
