= The Bookstore =

- Seinfeld episode
- Episode no.: Season 9 Episode 17
- Directed by: Andy Ackerman
- Story by: Spike Feresten and Darin Henry & Marc Jaffe
- Teleplay by: Spike Feresten
- Production code: 917
- Original air date: April 9, 1998

Guest appearances
- Wayne Knight as Newman; Barney Martin as Morty Seinfeld; Liz Sheridan as Helen Seinfeld; Len Lesser as Uncle Leo; John O'Hurley as J. Peterman; Jonathan Penner as Zach; Ted Rooney as Crichton; Jon Gries as Rusty; Sonya Eddy as Rebecca DeMornay; Merrin Dungey as cashier; Joe Goddbiff as Hobo Joe; Ruth Cohen as Ruthie Cohen (uncredited)

Episode chronology
← Previous "The Burning"	Next → "The Frogger"
- Seinfeld season 9

"The Bookstore" is the 173rd episode of the NBC sitcom Seinfeld. This was the 17th episode for the ninth and final season. It aired on April 9, 1998. In this episode, Jerry catches his Uncle Leo in the act of shoplifting, George is forced to buy a book after he is caught reading it in the bookstore's public bathroom, and Kramer and Newman attempt to start a rickshaw business.

== Plot ==
Jerry and George are at a bookstore, Brentano's, where George hopes to meet women. Jerry spots Uncle Leo shoplifting. He confronts Leo about it privately, and Leo promises to return the book, but on a subsequent visit, Jerry sees him shoplifting again. Jerry rats out Leo to the Brentano's security guard, intending only to scare him straight, but because Leo has a prior conviction, he now faces jail time. Jerry apologizes to Uncle Leo, but Leo tells him he never forgets when he's been betrayed. Jerry has nightmares about Leo seeking revenge on him.

George takes a book into the bookstore bathroom and later tries to put it back on a shelf, but the manager says he cannot after the book has been in the bathroom, forcing George to buy it. George tries to return it, but the book has been flagged as being in the bathroom. George tries to donate his book to Housing Works, but even they will not take the marked book. George plans to get even with Brentano's by stealing a copy of the same book and returning it to get his money back. Jerry tries to talk the same manager who caught George into letting Leo off lightly, but the store is having problems with theft, so he needs to "make an example" of someone. Realizing he can sacrifice someone else to save Leo, Jerry rats on George for his attempted shoplifting.

At the annual Peterman party, Elaine is depressed by the other staff showing her up dancing, so she and a man named Zach get drunk and make out at their table. George suggests Elaine tell everyone that she and Zach are dating, so she will not be known as the "office skank". However, she does not clear this with Zach, so he openly makes out with another woman. Elaine plans to use his "cheating" as her reason for ending the fake relationship. However, J. Peterman informs her that Zach is an opium addict, and makes Elaine help him quit cold turkey. Elaine gets through it without trouble, and the experience inspires her to pitch a "detox poncho" for the catalog.

Kramer and Newman plan to run a rickshaw service. They interview potential rickshaw pullers; however, one of the candidates steals the rickshaw. Newman and Kramer track it down. Kramer loses the counting-out game to determine who will pull it back. When Kramer gets tired of pulling Newman in the rickshaw up a hill and sets it down to take a break, the rickshaw runs backward over Zach.

== Production ==
The episode's Jerry story was inspired by a news item the episode's writer, Spike Feresten, saw on TV, about the rampant shoplifting being committed by the elderly.

The table read for the episode was held on February 14, 1998. The opening montage of Kramer in Jerry's apartment was filmed February 16, followed by a live audience taping on February 18, during which most of the scenes were filmed. At the last minute, the Kramer story for the episode was dumped. In the original story, Kramer finds an overworked cabbie named Mohabbit (played by Ted Davis) sleeping at the wheel. Kramer offers to take over his shift for a few hours each day, but his incompetence as a driver leads to the taxicab being towed. Mohabbit and Kramer then use Kramer's car as a taxicab. This story was replaced by the rickshaw story with Newman, which was filmed on March 1. To get the sequence with the runaway rickshaw, which was filmed on location in Los Angeles, the rickshaw was hitched to a truck which pulled Newman actor Wayne Knight along, and the truck was erased from the shots in post-production.

== Controversy ==
In this episode, J. Peterman referred to opium as "the Chinaman's nightcap". The episode prompted many Asian American viewers, including author Maxine Hong Kingston, to send letters of protest. In her letter, Kingston wrote that the term is "equivalent to niggers for blacks and kikes for Jews". Media watchdog Media Action Network for Asian Americans (MANAA) called on NBC to issue a public apology. NBC did not issue an apology, but it removed the offending term from the episode in the episode's rerun in May 1998. NBC's executive vice president for broadcast standards and content policy sent MANAA a letter stating that the network never intended to offend. MANAA was pleased with the studio's response despite the lack of an apology, and Kingston, while disappointed there was no apology, was pleased that the term was removed from the episode. The scene was eventually restored to the season 9 DVD release and as of October 2024, the term is present in the streaming version of the show on Netflix.
