= The Fatigues =

- Seinfeld episode
- Episode no.: Season 8 Episode 6
- Directed by: Andy Ackerman
- Written by: Gregg Kavet & Andy Robin
- Production code: 806
- Original air date: October 31, 1996

Guest appearances
- Jerry Stiller as Frank Costanza; Estelle Harris as Estelle Costanza; Steve Hytner as Bania; Richard Herd as Wilhelm; Joe Urla as Dugan; Ned Bellamy as Eddie; A.J. Langer as Abby; Katie Layman as Cynthia; Eddie Allen as Doctor; Gwen McGee as Janine; Lynn Manning as Blind Man

Episode chronology
← Previous "The Package"	Next → "The Checks"
- Seinfeld season 8

"The Fatigues" is the 140th episode of the sitcom Seinfeld. This was the sixth episode for the eighth season, originally airing on NBC on October 31, 1996. The episode, which centers on the theme of mentorships, won a Writers Guild of America award.

In the episode, Jerry and George both become mentors, Kramer asks for Frank's help cooking for a Jewish singles night, and Elaine promotes a fatigues-wearing J. Peterman employee because she is too intimidated to fire him.

== Plot ==
Jerry is intrigued that his girlfriend Abby has a mentor. Cynthia, Abby's mentor, is dating Kenny Bania. After she sees Bania's act, Abby loses respect for Cynthia and parts ways with her. George is assigned a lecture on risk management because his résumé says he is an expert on the subject. He cannot study for it because he hates reading. When George discovers the blind can get any book on tape, he intentionally flunks an eye test so he can get his book on tape. However, the reader's voice sounds like him, grating on him.

Elaine summons Eddie Sherman, a mailroom employee, to fire him for incompetence. When she meets him, she is intimidated by his gruff voice and military fatigues, so she promotes him instead just to have an excuse for the summons. He does a terrible job, so Elaine promotes him again to get rid of him. The other writers quit in outrage because he was promoted over them, forcing Elaine to write the catalogue alone with Eddie.

Kramer hosts a Jewish singles night at Frank's Knights of Columbus hall, but when he realizes that he cannot cook Jewish food, he begs for Frank's help. Frank refuses, still haunted by memories cooking for the army during the Korean War, when he sickened troops by over-seasoning three-week-old meat in an attempt to make it palatable.

When Cynthia dumps Bania because of his poor act, he turns to Jerry for advice. Jerry agrees to be his mentor. Hearing that Abby is looking for a new mentor, George takes her on so as to con her into studying and summarizing risk management for him. Their files get mixed, and Bania delivers Abby's summary of risk management (which earns good laughs) and George reads Jerry's routine on Ovaltine. Frank, displeased at Estelle's cooking, decides to cook again and helps Kramer get ready for Jewish singles night. Working well as a team of two, Elaine and Eddie finish the catalogue. When Elaine finds out that he adopted his frightening persona after a failure to meet a nice Jewish woman and settle down, she takes him to the Jewish singles night. The food is a hit, and Frank feels reborn. Due to his impressive string of promotions, Cynthia makes Eddie a better job offer. Distraught at losing her last remaining writer, Elaine violently shakes him, making him choke on his food; this, combined with Eddie's fatigues, gives Frank a flashback of the food-poisoning incident, driving him to throw his food off the tables and topple the entire buffet.

== Production ==
Writers Gregg Kavet and Andy Robin cited the episode as having the most painful editing stage of any Seinfeld episode they worked on. The filmed content ran long over the allotted 23 minutes, even by the standards of the typically packed Seinfeld episodes, and they said that the broadcast cut felt like a bare bones runthrough of the essential plot points. At least one piece of deleted content was cut for reasons other than length restrictions: Initially, Frank's flashback scene included close-ups of the soldiers spewing vomit towards the viewer, with a plastic shield employed to prevent the camera lens from being dirtied. The network ordered these shots removed, stating that they crossed the line of good taste, which director Andy Ackerman said in retrospect was the right decision.

Frank's memory is dramatized with music set to Samuel Barber's "Adagio for Strings", as in the film Platoon; however, Kavet and Robin said they were not trying to parody any film in particular, but war films in general.

While most of the risk management book's quoted text was scripted by Kavet and Robin, actor Jason Alexander added on the line "And what makes it so risky?"

A professional chef was hired for the sole purpose of performing Frank's one-handed egg cracking, but he had difficulty performing under the pressure of filming, and after numerous takes with messy egg-crackings, the egg was cracked by a member of the production crew.

== Reception ==
The episode and Gregg Kavet and Andy Robin won for Episodic Comedy at the Writers Guild of America Awards 1997.
