= The Betrayal =

- Seinfeld episode
- Episode no.: Season 9 Episode 8
- Directed by: Andy Ackerman
- Written by: Peter Mehlman and David Mandel
- Production code: 908
- Original air date: November 20, 1997

Guest appearances
- Justine Miceli as Nina; Brenda Strong as Sue Ellen; Wayne Knight as Newman; Heidi Swedberg as Susan Ross; Mike McShane as FDR; Bart Braverman as Zubin; Shaun Toub as Pinter; Noor Shic as Usha; Jocelyne Kelly as Model; Brian Kaiser as Postman; Shelley Malil as Usher; Bill Lee Brown as Partygoer; Ruth Cohen as Ruthie Cohen (uncredited)

Episode chronology
← Previous "The Slicer"	Next → "The Apology"
- Seinfeld season 9

"The Betrayal" is the 164th episode of the NBC sitcom Seinfeld. This was the eighth episode for the ninth and final season. It aired on November 20, 1997. In this episode, Jerry betrays George by having sex with George's girlfriend Nina, right before Elaine invites all three of them to come with her to India for the wedding of Sue Ellen Mischke, Elaine's longtime rival. The episode is colloquially referred to as the "backwards episode" due to its reverse chronology, starting with the final scene and playing in reverse order. Written collaboratively by Peter Mehlman (a major writer for Seinfeld seasons 2 through 8 who was no longer on staff) and David Mandel (one of the new wave of Seinfeld writers), the episode bridges Seinfeld's final season to its past with scenes from George's engagement to Susan Ross and Jerry's moving in to his apartment, and with a format which evoked the series' early gimmick-based episodes like "The Chinese Restaurant" and "The Limo".

== Plot ==
This episode presents a backwards narrative, running from the final scene to the first scene.

Jerry and George run into Nina, an old girlfriend of Jerry's with whom he never slept, because they had such conversational chemistry that there was never an awkward pause during which something could happen. George has Jerry set him up on a date with Nina, and feels he must wear his Timberland boots every time he sees her, because they elevate him such that he and Nina are eye-to-eye. Jerry and Nina suffer an awkward pause in their conversation, leading them to have sex. When Elaine finds out, he makes her promise to not tell George.

Elaine receives an invitation to Sue Ellen Mischke's wedding to Pinter Ranawat in India. Given the late arrival of the invitation, Elaine assumes it is an "unvitation" and that Sue Ellen does not want her to come. Elaine meets Pinter's parents, Usha and Zubin Ranawat, who advise her not to go to the wedding; they are not going themselves. To spite Sue Ellen, Elaine buys tickets to India for herself, Jerry, George, and Nina. Noticing Elaine's evasive behavior, George gets her drunk on schnapps. While under the influence, Elaine reveals Jerry and Nina's encounter to George, prompting the latter to snipe at Jerry during the flight to India.

Elaine, Jerry, George and Nina arrive in India, where Elaine recognizes Pinter as an ex-lover who was going by "Peter" at the time. Sue Ellen is so happy that Elaine came when none of her other invitees showed that she asks Elaine to be her maid of honor. Touched, Elaine reconciles with Sue Ellen and resolves not to let her find out about her affair with Pinter. Jerry gets Elaine drunk on schnapps to find out why George is acting bitterly towards him.

George and Jerry bicker over Nina during the wedding ceremony. While lecturing them to keep quiet, Elaine mentions her affair with Pinter. Amused by the revelation, George repeats it loudly enough for everyone to hear. Sue Ellen calls her wedding off, and ends her friendship with Elaine. George demands Nina choose between him and Jerry; she declares she is not interested in either man, and only came for a free trip to India.

Kramer attends Franklin Delano Romanowski (FDR)'s birthday, and FDR gives him "the evil eye" right before blowing out the candles on his cake. FDR reveals that his wish was for Kramer to drop dead, because Kramer hit him with a snowball two years before. Kramer negotiates for Newman to use his birthday wish to protect him from dropping dead, but he instead wishes for a date with a supermodel, which comes true. Newman's new girlfriend suggests Kramer counter the wish himself. Kramer and FDR try to out-wish each other by wishing on a shooting star, throwing coins in a fountain, pulling out eyelashes, and pulling a wishbone. Kramer finally persuades FDR to retract his wish in exchange for letting FDR hit him with a snowball.

== Production ==
The episode was written by Peter Mehlman and David Mandel. Mehlman had long since quit the Seinfeld writing team, but his office was in the same building as Mandel's, and one day he visited Mandel and told him about an idea he had for a Seinfeld episode.

"The Betrayal" is an homage to Harold Pinter's play Betrayal, imitating its use of reverse chronology and its central plot point of a man having sex with his friend's lover. The groom, Pinter Ranawat, was named in tribute to Harold Pinter. Having decided on the backwards chronology, Mehlman and Mandel set about coming up with the most bizarre and striking opening possible, in order to entice viewers to keep watching to see how the story begins. They came up with an Indian wedding, as well as an opening shot of Kramer's gravestone (with the rest of the episode revealing that he had resorted to faking his own death in order to escape FDR's wish). The manner of the wedding invite was drawn from the personal experience of another Seinfeld writer, Jeff Schaffer; Schaffer got a last-minute invitation to a wedding in a foreign country, with the heavy implication that he was expected to just send a gift rather than attend.

Having come up with the premises for the storylines, Mehlman and Mandel largely wrote the episode in forwards chronological order, though the last three scenes (chronologically the first three) were not conceived until the rest of the episode had been written. They added in the reverse chronology jokes afterwards. The Kramer storyline was continually reworked throughout the process, with the writers at one point trying to adjust the plot so that Kramer would independently end up in India, and Mehlman and Mandel ultimately felt dissatisfied with how it turned out.

Due to Seinfeld's immense success, budget limitations were virtually nonexistent by the time of this episode. Director Andy Ackerman half-jokingly said he would like an elephant for the episode, and to his surprise, was provided with one. Guest actress Heidi Swedberg, having not appeared on Seinfeld since her character Susan Ross died at the end of Season 7, had since cut her hair short, so she had to wear a custom-made Susan Ross wig for the episode.

Scenes which were filmed for the episode but deleted before broadcast include George stepping in goat dung while trying to walk off the need to go to the bathroom; George putting on his Timberlands just to walk across Nina's apartment to get the wine bottle and glasses; an extension of the aftermath scene in Monk's Cafe, in which Kramer accidentally steps on a child's toy and gets the evil eye before the child blows out his birthday candles; and an extension of the plane flight scene, in which Elaine takes the pillow from the man next to her, who turns out to be Magnus from "The Butter Shave".

Jerry mistaking Kramer's name as "Kessler" is a reference to "The Seinfeld Chronicles", in which Richards's character was named Kessler.

== Critical reception ==
Many viewers objected to the episode's reverse chronology, leading to a number of fan-edited "forwards versions" of the episode being posted on the Internet.

In a review of the Season 9 DVD for Cinematic Happenings Under Development, Trevor La Pay said "The Betrayal" was his least favorite episode in the entire Seinfeld series, calling it "a gimmick-based farce".

In a 2012 retrospective review, David Sims of The A.V. Club commented that "The Betrayal" was heavily reliant on the backwards format, making it an exciting and funny episode on first viewing, but uninteresting on repeat viewings after the viewer is already familiar with the plot.
