= The Jimmy =

- Seinfeld episode
- Episode no.: Season 6 Episode 19
- Directed by: Andy Ackerman
- Written by: Gregg Kavet & Andy Robin
- Production code: 617
- Original air date: March 16, 1995

Guest appearances
- Bryan Cranston as Tim Whatley; Mel Tormé as himself; Richard Herd as Wilhelm; Anthony Starke as Jimmy; Robert Katims as Deensfrei; Jimmy Bridges as Paramedic; Elan Carter as Receptionist; Alison Armitage as Cheryl; Peggy Lane as Office Worker (deleted scenes)

Episode chronology
| ← Previous "The Doorman" | Next → "The Doodle" |
- Seinfeld season 6

"The Jimmy" is the 105th episode of the NBC sitcom Seinfeld. This is the 19th episode for the sixth season. It originally aired on March 16, 1995. In this episode, George incriminates himself for a rash of thefts at the Yankees clubhouse; Elaine confuses a handsome man with Jimmy (Anthony Starke), who only speaks in the third person; Kramer is honored as a mentally handicapped adult; and Jerry discovers that Tim Whatley's dental clinic is now "adults only". Mel Tormé appears as himself.

== Plot ==
At the health club, Jimmy, a skilled dunker, carries George through a basketball game against Jerry and Kramer. Deeply impressed, George learns that Jimmy is importing plyometric training shoes that honed his vertical leap. Jimmy speaks in the third person all the while.

At a meeting, George's superior, Mr. Wilhelm, blames someone inside the Yankees clubhouse for an audacious spree of sports equipment thefts. Having just worked out, George exudes guilt as he sweats profusely.

Elaine needs a companion to go see Mel Tormé sing at a benefit for Able Mentally Challenged Adults (AMCA). Elaine decides to ask a handsome man from the health club; neither Jerry nor George will acknowledge any man as attractive, despite Elaine's admonition that this would not make them gay. Jimmy watches Elaine trying to charm the handsome man, then flirts with her in the third person; Elaine gleefully assumes that the handsome man is "Jimmy" and she is getting hooked up with him.

Tim Whatley's dental clinic now has Penthouse magazines in the waiting room, serves adults only, and generously administers anesthetics. Kramer returns from the clinic so numbed with novocaine that he slurs his speech and cannot keep water in his mouth. Jimmy slips and falls on the water Kramer dribbled, breaking his leg. Meanwhile, George has gone into business with Jimmy, but fails to sell any shoes without Jimmy showing off his jumping prowess.

Arnold Deensfrei, the head of AMCA, sees Kramer wearing Jimmy's high training shoes while slurring. Not realizing that Deensfrei is lauding him as a mentally handicapped adult living independently, Kramer gets invited to sit with Tormé at the benefit as guest of honor.

Whatley, having "swapped" female hygienists with another dentist, knocks out Jerry with nitrous oxide for a procedure. Jerry wakes up hazily seeing Whatley and the hygienist adjusting their clothes, and becomes paranoid that they undressed and molested him.

Mr. Wilhelm overhears George selling "athletic gear" over the phone, and fingers him as the thief; having just eaten Jerry's very spicy leftover Kung Pao chicken, George sweats profusely again at the accusation. Meanwhile, George starts unconsciously lapsing into the third person.

Elaine learns who "Jimmy" really is, but also learns that the handsome man was gay all along. Elaine takes the hobbled Jimmy to the benefit, but, holding a grudge, Jimmy punches Kramer, giving him swollen lips. With Kramer slurring once more and unable to coordinate his lips, no one notices anything amiss as Mel Tormé sings "When You're Smiling" in honor of Kramer's "courage".

George must answer for the thefts to George Steinbrenner, but defends himself in the third person. Steinbrenner agrees that "George" is innocent because he himself did not steal the equipment, and drops the subject in confusion.

Later, Jerry is aghast when Kramer reads a letter in Penthouse from a dentist, confessing to committing mischiefs upon unsuspecting patients.

== Production ==
A crew member gave guest star Bryan Cranston the idea of Dr. Whatley taking a hit of the nitrous oxide before giving it to Jerry. Casting for Whatley's two hygienists specifically called for actresses with experience in nude modeling to add realism to a (deleted before broadcast) scene in which Kramer and Jerry recognize one of the hygienists in a nude photo in Penthouse.

Mel Tormé's performance of "When You're Smiling" was done in a single take before a live studio audience. Tormé's acting in the episode was so convincing that many who watched it, including Jason Alexander (who plays George), suspected that Tormé had not been fully briefed on the plot and was under the mistaken impression that Kramer actor Michael Richards really was mentally handicapped. In actuality, Tormé and Richards were already acquainted with each other before filming the episode.

The episode features the first appearance of Richard Herd as Mr. Wilhelm.
