= The Hot Tub =

- Seinfeld episode
- Episode no.: Season 7 Episode 5
- Directed by: Andy Ackerman
- Written by: Gregg Kavet & Andy Robin
- Production code: 705
- Original air date: October 19, 1995

Guest appearances
- Richard Herd as Wilhelm; Jeremiah Birkett as Jean-Paul; Leon Russom as Clayton; Ernie Lively as Zeke; Charles Cyphers as Gardner; Kate Mulligan as Sheri; Susan Isaacs as Woman; Thom Barry as Manager; Jeff Miller as Event Guard; Ruth Cohen as Ruthie Cohen (uncredited); Lee Bear as George Steinbrenner (uncredited); Larry David as George Steinbrenner (voice) (uncredited)

Episode chronology
← Previous "The Wink"	Next → "The Soup Nazi"
- Seinfeld season 7

"The Hot Tub" is the 115th episode of the NBC sitcom Seinfeld. This was the fifth episode for the seventh season. It aired on October 19, 1995. In this episode, Jerry makes a chore out of waking up a marathon runner staying with Elaine; George goes too far trying to look busy at work; and Kramer's new hot tub backfires on him.

== Plot ==
George starts grimacing at work as a ruse to look busy during the Yankees' off-season lull. Elaine, assigned to write sales copy for J. Peterman's "Himalayan walking shoes", has writer's block; she is also hosting Jean-Paul, a runner visiting from Trinidad and Tobago. After ignominiously oversleeping and missing his own race at the Olympics years ago, Jean-Paul has finally resumed racing for the New York City Marathon. Jerry meets Elaine's neighbor Judy, who was abandoned by her baby's father out of wedlock; Elaine holds Jerry to keep this a secret. Kramer uses Jerry's water to fill a new hot tub in his living room.

Jerry makes a chore out of waking up Jean-Paul on race day, and holds Elaine responsible even though she never volunteered. At the office, George gets agitated by minor inconveniences, exacerbating his visible annoyance, so Mr. Wilhelm sends George on a break to entertain guests from the Houston Astros. George bonds over drinks with the rowdy, foul-mouthed Texans, who casually call everyone "bastards" or "sons of bitches". The Texans' mannerisms rub off on George, impressing Jean-Paul; however, Wilhelm is alarmed by George aggressively cussing out the Texans over the phone.

Kramer lets in cold air to enhance his hot tub soak, which lulls him to sleep; the water heater fails, and he wakes up hypothermic in chilly water. Jerry relentlessly casts doubt on Elaine's punctuality and her ability to set alarms, and demands to book Jean-Paul a hotel room so he can have a wake-up call. Jean-Paul does not want to spurn Elaine's hospitality; however, emulating George, Jean-Paul calls Judy's baby a "little bastard" and gets evicted for harassment. Judy, assuming her child's parentage got out, blames Elaine.

Jean-Paul has no choice but to accept Jerry's offer. Jerry overcomplicates scheduling a wake-up call, annoying the hotel front desk; fearing retaliation, he pulls out of the hotel and makes Jean-Paul sleep over. Meanwhile, Elaine roams the streets searching for Jean-Paul. Lost in thought and weary, she finds unexpected comfort in the walking shoes, delivering the inspiration to finish her assignment.

Desperate for warmth, Kramer installs an industrial-grade water heater, which overloads the entire building's power mains overnight. With no alarms, Jerry and Jean-Paul oversleep by hours, but thanks to Jerry's skillful driving, Jean-Paul still makes the marathon and takes the lead. Running past spectators offering water to cool him down, Jean-Paul instead grabs Kramer's piping hot tea and receives a painful scalding.

Steinbrenner, learning that George is "cracking" under pressure, insists on sharing a hot tub one-on-one with him.
