= Live Free or Die (2006 film) =

- Live Free or Die one sheet
- Directed by: Gregg Kavet; Andy Robin
- Written by: Gregg Kavet; Andy Robin
- Starring: Aaron Stanford; Paul Schneider; Ebon Moss-Bachrach; Judah Friedlander; Michael Rapaport; Kevin Dunn; Zooey Deschanel
- Release date: 2006
- Running time: 89 minutes
- Country: United States
- Language: English

Live Free or Die is a 2006 American black comedy film starring Aaron Stanford, Paul Schneider, Zooey Deschanel, Michael Rapaport, Judah Friedlander, Kevin Dunn, and Ebon Moss-Bachrach. It was written and directed by former Seinfeld writers Gregg Kavet and Andy Robin. The film was shot in 2004.

== Plot ==
A clueless, aspiring criminal named John "Rugged" Rudgate spends his days forging rebate coupons and selling speakers out the back of his van. One day, Rugged runs into an old acquaintance, the dim-witted Jeff Lagrand, who recently returned home to help his cynical sister run the storage facility that they inherited from their father. When Rugged tries to force his way into the Lagrand family business, things go terribly wrong—and the situation gets even more complicated when an emotionally unstable cop begins investigating.

== Filming and production ==
Most of the film was shot in 2004.

== Reception ==
The film-review aggregate website Rotten Tomatoes gave the film a 40% approval rating. Film critic Frank Lovece of Film Journal International praised Aaron Stanford as "the young Steve Buscemi" and wrote that despite the film's "lack of visual click, Live Free or Die manages to be poignant without even being maudlin" and that "none of the movie's flaws negate its many remarkable little performances and casually insightful script.'

== See also ==
- "Live Free or Die", the state motto of New Hampshire
