= The Checks =

- Seinfeld episode
- Episode no.: Season 8 Episode 7
- Directed by: Andy Ackerman
- Written by: Steve O'Donnell and Tom Gammill & Max Pross
- Production code: 807
- Original air date: November 7, 1996

Guest appearances
- Gedde Watanabe as Mr. Oh; James Patrick Stuart as Brett; Richard Herd as Wilhelm; Sab Shimono as Executive #1; Akane Nelson as Executive #2; John Bowman as Teddy; George Wallace as Doctor; Jack Plotnick as Crew Leader; Toshi Toda as Mr. Tanaka; Goh Misawa as Mr. Yamaguchi; Tony V. as Clicky; Cherie Hankal as Nurse

Episode chronology
← Previous "The Fatigues"	Next → "The Chicken Roaster"

"The Checks" is the 141st episode of the sitcom Seinfeld. This was the seventh episode for the eighth season, originally airing on NBC on November 7, 1996. In this episode, the last to feature the writing team of Tom Gammill and Max Pross, Elaine's new boyfriend is enthralled by the song "Desperado" and mistakenly thinks Jerry is in dire financial straits, Kramer hosts a group of vacationing Japanese businessmen at his apartment, and Jerry and George try to sell their "Jerry" pilot to Japanese television.

== Plot ==
Elaine's new boyfriend, Brett, is obsessed with furniture designed by Karl Farbman and the song "Desperado" by the Eagles. Jerry spots an umbrella salesman using a technique he invented, "The Twirl", but the salesman claims that it was invented by Teddy Padillac, an umbrella salesman Jerry once worked with.

Twelve-cent royalty checks keep arriving from Jerry's brief appearance on a Japanese television show, the Super Terrific Happy Hour. Kramer warns George that the carpet cleaners he hired are actually a front for a religious cult. Intrigued, George waits for them to give their pitch, but they are uninterested in him.

Kramer meets some Japanese businessmen on vacation and takes them on a tour of the city. Confused about the value of ¥50,000 (about $460 in 1996), Kramer spends all their money on expensive clothing and souvenirs. Brett delivers an oversized chest of drawers to Kramer and thinks Jerry might be jealous. Kramer thinks Jerry and George's TV pilot would be perfect for Japanese television. They pitch it to Japanese television executives, who are unimpressed.

Elaine suggests that she and Brett make "Witchy Woman" (also by the Eagles) their song, but he rejects it; Elaine then suggests they share "Desperado", but Brett says "it's mine". Having run them out of money, Kramer puts his Japanese friends up at his apartment. They sleep in the chest of drawers (much like a capsule hotel) and drink with him in his hot tub. Jerry, caught in the rain, runs into Teddy Padillac. Padillac, incensed that Jerry is trying to take credit for "The Twirl", demands $200 for an umbrella. Unable to come up with the money, Jerry is left standing in the rain. Brett is convinced that Jerry is poor since he has no Karl Farbman furniture in his apartment, carries around 12¢ checks, and is unable to afford an umbrella.

George hires the cleaners to do the offices at Yankee Stadium, where they recruit George's boss, Mr. Wilhelm. George is upset that the cult chose to recruit Wilhelm and not him. The humidity from the hot tub warps the wooden chest and Kramer's guests get stuck in the drawers. Suffering from writer's cramp after endorsing all the royalty checks, Jerry can't force the drawers open and instead uses a fire ax to smash open the chest. Brett is injured when he attempts to stop Jerry from destroying the Farbman chest. The scared Japanese tourists tell the television executives about the incident, ruining any chance of selling the "Jerry" pilot to Japanese television. While Brett is being operated on for his injury, the surgeon becomes distracted by "Witchy Woman" playing in much the same way Brett was distracted by "Desperado".

== Production ==
The episode was written by the veteran Seinfeld writing partnership of Tom Gammill and Max Pross from a rough outline by Steve O'Donnell which included several key ideas used in the completed episode, such as Kramer having Japanese tourists sleep in drawers. Gammill and Pross had left the Seinfeld writing staff after season 7, but their new contract allowed them to still "consult" on Seinfeld, which gave them the opportunity to script "The Checks". Their contract was subsequently revised to close this unintended loophole, preventing them from writing any further Seinfeld episodes.

Jerry Seinfeld worked as an umbrella salesman during the 1980s, and has claimed to have invented the umbrella twirl just as his character does during the episode. The Brett story was based on a man Gammill met on a ski trip who would similarly zone out whenever the song "Desperado" played.

The opening scene was filmed on September 29, 1996. The scene was originally intended for the episode "The Fatigues". The second scene was filmed on October 7, 1996, while the third scene was filmed on October 8, 1996.

The last line before the credits had two versions made—one for if the New York Yankees won the 1996 World Series and one for if they lost the World Series. Two of the episode's guest stars (Richard Herd and Sab Shimono) had previously appeared in the 1980 M*A*S*H episode "Back Pay".

In the scene where Jerry is denied the purchase of an umbrella on the street by former colleagues a man walks by wearing an 'urban sombrero', featured in the season eight premiere episode "The Foundation".
