= The Comeback (Seinfeld) =

- Seinfeld episode
- Episode no.: Season 8 Episode 13
- Directed by: David Owen Trainor
- Written by: Gregg Kavet; Andy Robin
- Production code: 812
- Original air date: January 30, 1997

Guest appearances
- Ben Stein as Alan Shellbach; Mark Harelik as Milos; Ivana Miličević as Patty (Milos' wife); Joel Polis as Reilly; Danny Strong as Vincent; Robby Benson as Vincent (voice, uncredited); Richard Livingston as Bill; Charles Kahlenburg as Fred; Stan Sellers as McAdam; Peggy Mannix as Woman; Fatima Lowe as Secretary; Nancy Linehan Charles as Woman Exec.; Jeff Hatz as Manager

Episode chronology
← Previous "The Money"	Next → "The Van Buren Boys"

"The Comeback" is the 147th episode of the NBC sitcom Seinfeld. This was the thirteenth episode of the eighth season, originally airing on January 30, 1997.

The episode was written by Gregg Kavet & Andy Robin and was directed by David Owen Trainor.

In the episode, George Costanza goes to great lengths to deliver a retort (the eponymous comeback) to a coworker that he thought of too late to deliver on the spot (a phenomenon described by the French expression l'esprit de l'escalier). Jerry Seinfeld learns the proprietor of a tennis pro shop is a bad tennis player. After seeing a movie, Cosmo Kramer decides he needs a living will. Elaine Benes has a tragic romance with a video store employee who shares her taste in movies.

== Plot ==
George's coworker Reilly notices him stuffing himself with shrimp cocktail at a meeting and remarks: "Hey George, the ocean called; they're running out of shrimp." After the meeting, George thinks up a comeback: "Well, the Jerk Store called, and they're running out of you." He becomes obsessed with recreating the encounter so that he can make use of this comeback, despite Jerry, Elaine and Kramer all telling him that the comeback makes no sense.

Reilly changes jobs to Firestone in Akron, Ohio. George flies there to attend a meeting, and brings a tray of shrimp, prompting Reilly to repeat his "ocean" zinger. When George delivers the comeback, Reilly simply shoots back "What's the difference? You're their all-time bestseller." In desperation, George claims he had sex with Reilly's wife. This reduces the room to an offended silence, since Reilly's wife is in a coma. After arriving back in New York, George thinks of a new comeback, beginning with "the life support machine called...", and makes a U-turn so he can fly back to Akron and deliver it.

While browsing the staff picks at Champagne Video, Elaine becomes a fan of Vincent's picks. While Elaine is watching a Vincent pick, he calls her on the telephone. Elaine becomes romantically interested in him, but he refuses to meet her in person. On a subsequent visit to the video store, Elaine craves something lighter than the tearjerkers which dominate Vincent's picks. Kramer convinces her to try a Gene pick, Weekend at Bernie's II. Vincent feels betrayed by this, terminates their relationship, and stops making picks.

After Elaine rents Vincent's pick that she spurned in favor of Weekend at Bernie's II, Vincent agrees to meet her at his apartment if she brings some vodka, cigarettes, and fireworks. When she arrives, he refuses to open the door all the way. His mother opens the door, revealing that Vincent is 15 years old. Mortified, Elaine takes the vodka from the bag and walks off.

Jerry is pressured into buying a high end racquet by the worker at a pro tennis shop, an Eastern European man named Milos. While playing at a tennis club with Elaine, Jerry discovers that Milos is a horrible tennis player. In Jerry's eyes, this undermines Milos' credibility as a salesman. Milos offers to do anything in exchange for Jerry not revealing his secret. While in the shop, Jerry's eye is caught by an attractive woman. The woman, named Patty, waits for him outside his apartment. She propositions him for sex, but recoils in shame, revealing that she is Milos' wife and was instructed to seduce Jerry by her husband. The incident makes her lose respect for Milos.

Kramer rents a straight-to-video movie about a woman in a coma. Frightened by the movie, he has a living will drawn up. He retains a lawyer named Shellbach, with Elaine as his executor, and opts to have his life support terminated in all but the most extreme cases. Kramer finishes watching the movie, in which the woman comes out of the coma. Not having known that it is possible to awake from a coma, he resolves to get his living will annulled, but misses his appointment. He learns that he can catch up with Shellbach at the tennis club.

Milos asks Jerry to let him win a game of tennis to regain Patty's respect. During the game, Milos derides Jerry's tennis ability. Frustrated at Milos' taunts, Jerry begins to play for real. He hits a ball wide of Milos, who swings wildly at it, releasing his racquet into the air. It comes down on another tennis player, who falls on a ball machine, redirecting its aim to Kramer's head. Kramer ends up in the hospital. When Elaine visits him, looking for an outlet for her VCR, she unplugs a large plug. Kramer wakes up and screams, seeing the plug in Elaine's hand and thinking she just removed his life-support.

== Cultural references ==
The relationship between Elaine and Vincent is a reference to The Phantom of the Opera, which was in its 9th year on Broadway at the time.

== Production ==
Although the episode is credited as written solely by the writing team of Gregg Kavet and Andy Robin, the eponymous story arc was actually contributed by Peter Mehlman. Kavet and Robin had been working on a story involving the Yankee management, and had even cast Ben Stein for it, but felt the story was not working out and decided to instead use Mehlman's "comeback" idea, which Mehlman had been trying to get into a Seinfeld episode for years. Kavet and Robin consciously scripted the scenes where Jerry, Elaine, and Kramer try to talk George out of the "jerk store" comeback as a satire of the writing-by-committee method which was common in television (and which Seinfeld had just switched to after seven years in which individual writers and writing partners wrote their episodes largely in isolation).

Regular Seinfeld director Andy Ackerman was on vacation, so the episode was directed by David Owen Trainor.

The tennis match was set in an indoor court, but the crew was unable to book an indoor court in time to use it as a filming location. Instead, they used a crane to drape a tent over an outdoor tennis court, making it look like an indoor court. El Niño was affecting the weather patterns in the United States, resulting in heavy rain in Los Angeles on the week the crew shot the tennis court scenes. Rain collected on the tent, putting the cast and crew in danger of having hundreds of pounds of water dumped on them if the tent were to collapse, and seeped in underneath, creating electrical hazards. After filming of the master shots wrapped (by which time the crane's back wheels were lifting off the ground from the weight of the water), the cast and crew cleared out, and the remaining footage was filmed back at the studio on a makeshift half-court set.

The role of Vincent was played by Danny Strong and voiced by Robby Benson, since the writers wanted Vincent to sound older than he was. In real life, Strong was knowledgeable about films from an early age. He would rent videos from Video Archives.

Kavet and Robin were both big childhood fans of the TV drama Emergency!, and asked the casting staff to try to get Robert Fuller, who played Dr. Kelly Brackett on the show, to voice the doctor on the movie-within-a-TV-episode The Other Side of Darkness. Fuller agreed, and Robin's wife Anna (also a fan of Emergency!) played opposite him as the voice of the patient.

Kramer's trip to the executor was originally much longer, but some scenes, such as Kramer navigating across a wet floor to get to the elevator, were cut before broadcast.

== Critical reception ==
David Sims of The A.V. Club wrote, "Things are pretty disconnected in this episode, although Kramer, Jerry and Elaine all sorta come together by the end (just for a cheap, quick gag, but it's a decent one)... Elaine's romance with Vincent (played, oh so briefly, by a young Danny Strong) is more fun, although as a Phantom of the Opera spoof it feels very stale... But I like the communication that goes on between them through the video aisles and Vincent's battle for artistic supremacy with the more middle-of-the-road Gene ..."

Nick Suss wrote for the site StoriesHouse, "Like most episodes of Seinfeld, The Comeback wove four plots together seamlessly while connecting each of them with conversation. The episode was witty, silly, poignant and above all else laden with quotes."
