= The Clip Show =

- Seinfeld episodes
- Episode nos.: Season 9 Episodes 21/22
- Directed by: Andy Ackerman
- Written by: Darin Henry
- Production code: 921/922
- Original air date: May 14, 1998
- Running time: 42 minutes

Episode chronology
← Previous "The Puerto Rican Day"	Next → "The Finale"
- Seinfeld season 9

"The Clip Show" (also known as "The Chronicle", from the episode's title sequence) is an hour-long, two-part episode that constitutes the 177th and 178th episodes of the NBC sitcom Seinfeld. These were the 21st and 22nd episodes of Seinfeld from the ninth and final season. It aired on May 14, 1998. Both parts of "The Clip Show" were seen by an average of 58.53 million viewers. To accommodate the long running time of "The Finale", "The Clip Show" ran for 45 minutes on its initial airing. When rerun, it was split into two half-hour episodes, with a new scene added to introduce the second episode. The episode is a clip show containing just a few minutes of previously unseen footage, most of which is bloopers from previous episodes and behind-the-scenes photographs rather than newly filmed content.

== Plot ==
=== Part 1 ===
Jerry, Elaine, George, and Kramer plan to go to the movies, but Jerry takes out a little time to look at nine years of memories. Jerry breaks the fourth wall by talking directly to the audience, while Kramer and George interrupt by yelling back at Jerry, worried that they'll miss the previews.

The first montage of clips has the original audio removed and replaced by "Superman Theme" by John Williams. Superman is Jerry Seinfeld's favorite superhero and is often referenced in the show. The montage consists of action sequences and shots of characters expressing a sense of triumph.

Swing music plays over short clips of the cast wearing different costumes and hairstyles.

=== Part 2 ===
Kramer comes up to get Jerry. "Don't Stop 'Til You Get Enough" by Michael Jackson plays during clips of the cast dancing. More clips are seen and the closing minutes feature a series of bloopers, behind-the-scenes production, and a montage set to the Green Day song "Good Riddance (Time of Your Life)". The show ends with a clip of the four main characters getting off a subway train and going their separate ways, followed by one last set of bloopers.
