= David Owen Trainor =

American television director

- Occupation(s): Television director, camera operator and technical coordinator
- Years active: 1988–2002

David Owen Trainor is an American television director.

He began his career working as a camera operator on the feature film Paramedics in 1988. He then went on to camera operate on the sitcom Seinfeld in 1990 before being promoted to technical coordinator in 1991. He went on to direct two episodes of the series, "The Secretary" (1994) and "The Comeback" (1997). He also worked as a technical coordinator on the series Brother's Keeper, Just Shoot Me! (one episode for each series), Ellen and Working (directing two episodes for the two latter series). As well directing episodes of the NBC sitcoms Boston Common and Good Morning, Miami, his last television credit to date.
