= Gregg Kavet =

American film director

- Born: 1968 or 1969 (age 56–57)
- Education: Harvard University
- Occupation: Screenwriter

Gregg Kavet (born 1968 or 1969) is a writer and director who worked on NBC's Seinfeld for several seasons with collaborator Andy Robin. The team wrote episodes including "The Jimmy", "The Hot Tub", "The Caddy", "The Bottle Deposit", "The Fatigues", "The Comeback", "The Nap", and "The Slicer". The Fatigues won the 1997 Writers Guild of America Award for best television comedy.

== Biography ==
Kavet and Robin wrote and directed the feature film Live Free or Die. This independent film won the Jury Prize for best narrative at the 2006 South By Southwest Film Festival and was awarded the Jury Prize in New American Cinema at the 2006 Seattle International Film Festival. They also wrote the 2005 Simon Spotlight book Saving Face, a humorous guide to awkward social situations.

Kavet grew up in Wayland, Massachusetts, attending Wayland High School and Harvard University. He currently lives in Los Angeles.

== Work on Seinfeld ==
All written in collaboration with Andy Robin, unless otherwise noted.

=== Season 6 ===
- "The Jimmy"

=== Season 7 ===
- "The Hot Tub"
- "The Caddy"
- "The Bottle Deposit"

=== Season 8 ===
- "The Fatigues"
- "The Comeback"
- "The Nap"

=== Season 9 ===
- "The Slicer" (with Robin and Darin Henry)
- "The Frogger" (with Robin, Steve Koren and Dan O'Keefe)
- "The Puerto Rican Day" (with Robin, Koren, O'Keefe, Alec Berg, Jennifer Crittenden, Spike Feresten, Bruce Eric Kaplan, David Mandel, and Jeff Schaffer)
