= Andy Robin =

American film director

- Born: 1968 or 1969 (age 57–58)
- Education: Harvard University; Brown University
- Occupation: Screenwriter

Andy Robin (born 1968 or 1969) is a writer who worked on NBC's Seinfeld, alone and with collaborator Gregg Kavet. Their episode "The Fatigues" won the 1997 Writers Guild of America Award.

Robin and Kavet wrote and directed the feature film Live Free or Die. This independent film won the Jury Prize for best narrative at the 2006 South By Southwest Film Festival and was awarded the Jury Prize in New American Cinema at the 2006 Seattle International Film Festival. They also wrote the 2005 Simon Spotlight book Saving Face – How to Lie, Fake, and Maneuver Your Way Out of Life's Most Awkward Situations, a humorous guide to awkward social situations.

== Personal life ==
Robin attended undergrad at Harvard and after 18 years in show business pursued a medical degree at Brown University. He is currently a psychiatrist.

== Work on Seinfeld ==
Season 6 to 8 episodes all written in collaboration with Gregg Kavet.

=== Season 4 ===
- "The Junior Mint"

=== Season 5 ===
- "The Barber"

=== Season 6 ===
- "The Jimmy"

=== Season 7 ===
- "The Hot Tub"
- "The Caddy"
- "The Bottle Deposit"

=== Season 8 ===
- "The Fatigues"
- "The Comeback"
- "The Nap"

=== Season 9 ===
- "The Slicer" (with Kavet and Darin Henry)
- "The Frogger" (with Kavet, Steve Koren and Dan O'Keefe)
- "The Puerto Rican Day" (with Kavet, Koren, O'Keefe, Alec Berg, Jennifer Crittenden, Spike Feresten, Bruce Eric Kaplan, David Mandel, and Jeff Schaffer)

== Awards ==
- 1997 Writers Guild of America Award for best television comedy (The Fatigues)
