= Darin Henry =

American television writer

- Born: 1970 or 1971 (age 55–56)
- Education: Temple University
- Occupation: Screenwriter

Darin Henry (born 1970 or 1971) is an American television writer. He has written for many different television series, including Seinfeld, Futurama, The War at Home and Oddballs. He also wrote a Big Finish Doctor Who audio called The Game. He wrote an episode for Shake It Up and is the co-executive producer for the series.

== Writing credits ==
My Family

- "While you Weren't Sleeping" (series 5)
- "Neighbour Wars" (series 8) (Also for the last episode of series 8 Henry was credited as an associate producer with Paul Minnett & Brian Leveson)
- "The Guru" and "Kenzo's Project" (co-written with Tom Anderson) (series 9)
- "Mary Christmas" (co-written with Paul Minnett & Brian Leveson) (series 10)
- "Darts All, Folks" (series 11)

Not Going Out

- "Amy" (co-written with Lee Mack)
- "Dancing" (co-written with Lee Mack)

Seinfeld

- "The Van Buren Boys" (season 8)
- "The Slicer" (with Gregg Kavet and Andy Robin) (season 9)
- "The Bookstore" (season 9)
- "The Clip Show, Part 1" (season 9)

Futurama

- "The Problem with Popplers"

The War at Home

- "It's a Living"
- "Three's Company"

Shake It Up

- "Whodunit Up?" (season 2)
- "Spirit It Up" (season 3)
- "Clean It Up" (season 3)
- "Forward and Back It Up" (season 3) (with Jennifer Glickman)
- "Stress It Up" (season 3)

K.C. Undercover

- "Off the Grid" (season 1)
- "Double Crossed: Part 3" (season 1)
- "Stakeout Takeout" (season 1)
- "The Neighborhood Watchdogs" (season 1)
- "First Friend" (season 1)
- "The Mother of All Missions" (season 2)
- "In Too Deep" (season 2)
- "Virtual Insanity" (season 2)
- "Web of Lies" (season 3)
- "Keep on Truckin'" (season 3)
- "Stormy Weather" (season 3)
- "The Domino Effect" (season 3)

Oddballs

- "Wanted Dead or a Fly"
- "Line Cutters"
- "Pillow Fight Club"
- "Almost Home Alone"
- "Partners"
