= The Finale (Seinfeld) =

- Seinfeld episodes
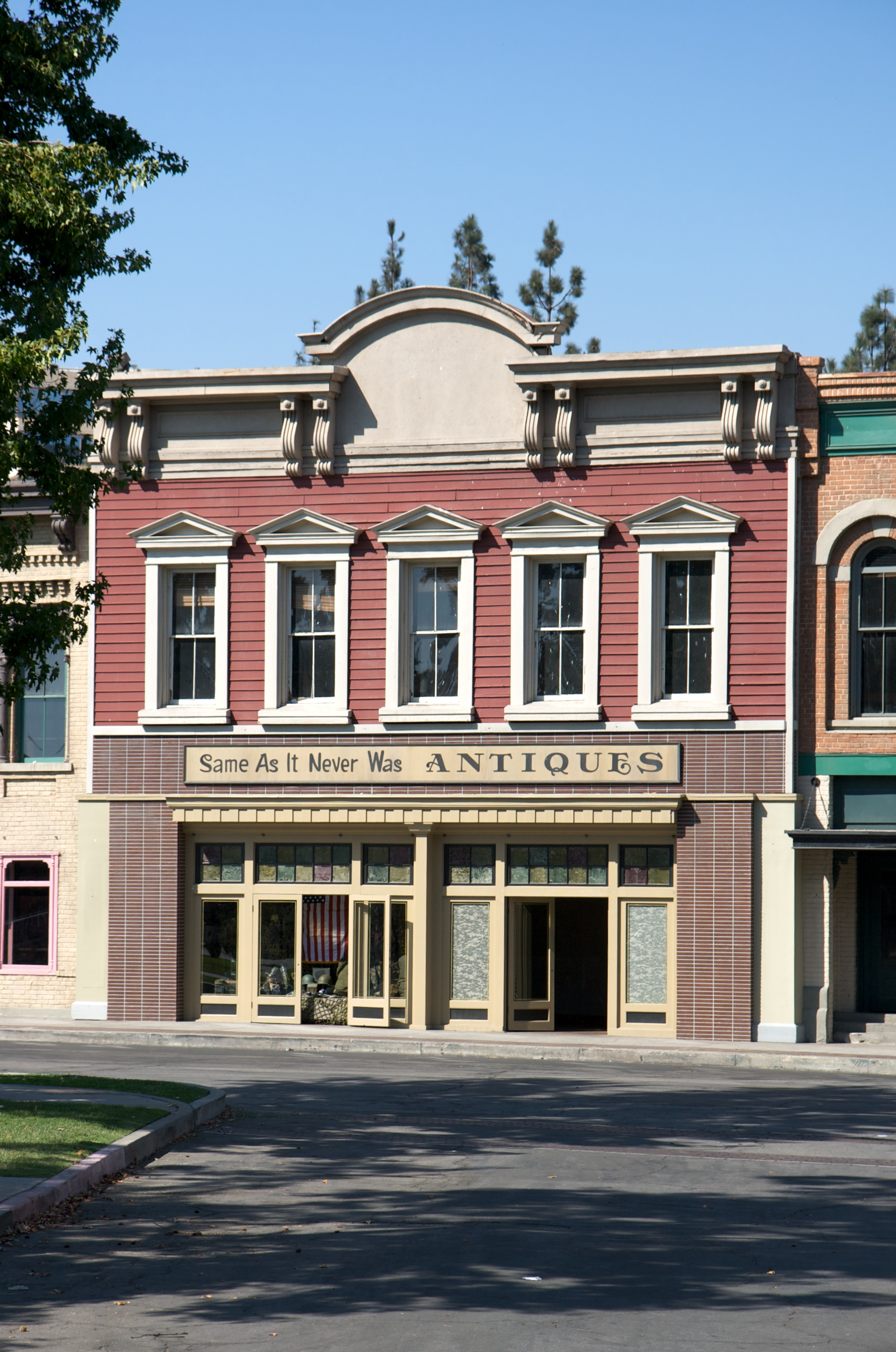
- The set shown here was used in this episode
- Episode nos.: Season 9 Episodes 23/24
- Directed by: Andy Ackerman
- Written by: Larry David
- Production code: 923/924
- Original air date: May 14, 1998
- Running time: 56 minutes

Guest appearances
- Wayne Knight as Newman; Stanley Anderson as Judge Arthur Vandelay; Philip Baker Hall as Lt. Joe Bookman; Estelle Harris as Estelle Costanza; Jerry Stiller as Frank Costanza; Barney Martin as Morty Seinfeld; Liz Sheridan as Helen Seinfeld; Phil Morris as Jackie Chiles; John Pinette as Howie; James Rebhorn as District Attorney Hoyt; Peter Riegert as NBC President James Kimbrough

Episode chronology
← Previous "The Clip Show"	Next → —
- Seinfeld season 9

"The Finale" is the series finale of the American television sitcom Seinfeld. It is the 23rd and 24th episodes of the ninth season, and the 179th and the 180th episodes overall. The episode, written by series co-creator Larry David and directed by Andy Ackerman, originally aired on NBC on May 14, 1998, to an average audience of 76 million viewers, making it the fourth-most watched overall television series finale. In the preceding hour, a clip show called "The Clip Show" aired. The initial running time for the finale was 1 hour and 15 minutes.

In this episode, Jerry and George's Jerry pilot is finally picked up as a series by NBC. However, when their private plane is forced to land in a small town in Massachusetts, Jerry, George, and their friends Elaine and Kramer unknowingly violate a local duty to rescue law (referred to as a Good Samaritan law in the episode's dialogue) and are put on trial. Co-creator Larry David, who departed from the series after the seventh season, returned to write the script for this last episode.

The episode received polarized mixed reviews.

== Plot ==
NBC's new President James Kimbrough contacts Jerry and George, offering a deal to produce their pilot Jerry as a series. Jerry and George will be moving to California to begin work. Jerry is given use of NBC's private jet and he, George, Elaine, and Kramer decide to go to Paris for "one last hurrah". Elaine calls her friend Jill to ask about the health of Jill’s father. First, she cannot get any reception with her cell phone on the street. Then, Jerry calls her with news of the pilot pickup and Elaine ends her call with Jill to take Jerry's call.

On the plane, Kramer desperately tries to get the water out of his ears from a trip to the beach by jumping up and down. He stumbles into the cockpit, causing the pilots to lose control. They make an emergency landing in the town of Latham, Massachusetts. While waiting for the airplane to be repaired, they witness an overweight man named Howie getting carjacked at gunpoint. They make fat jokes while Kramer films the theft on his camcorder. Howie tells an officer nearby, who arrests Jerry and his friends in accordance with a new law called the Good Samaritan law that requires bystanders to help out in such a situation.

Jerry calls on Jackie Chiles to represent them for the upcoming trial. The prosecution has the eyewitness testimonies of Howie and the responding officer and Kramer's camcorder recording as proof of their violation, but because this is the first case implementing this law, District Attorney Hoyt stacks the case against them as much as possible by summoning numerous character witnesses. Nearly everyone the defendants have met over the past nine years is brought in to testify to their unethical behavior, both real and assumed.

The jury finds Jerry, George, Elaine, and Kramer guilty of criminal indifference, and the judge sentences them to a year in prison. While awaiting their prison transport, Kramer finally gets the water out of his ears. Elaine decides to use her one phone call from prison to call Jill, saying that the prison call is the "king of calls". Jerry and George discuss the button on George's shirt, with George pointing out that they've had the exact conversation before.

== Cast ==
"The Finale" featured a massive cast. As usual for Seinfeld, the four regular cast members all appeared:

- Jerry Seinfeld as himself
- Jason Alexander as George Costanza
- Julia Louis-Dreyfus as Elaine Benes
- Michael Richards as Cosmo Kramer

The following actors headed up the Latham cast:

- Stanley Anderson as Judge Arthur Vandelay
- John Pinette as Howie
- Jeff Johnson as Thief
- James Rebhorn as District Attorney Hoyt
- Scott Jaeck as Officer Matt Vogel

The Seinfeld team made an effort to recruit as many guest stars from previous episodes as possible for "The Finale". However, only a handful of them were given significant roles:

- Phil Morris as Jackie Chiles
- Peter Riegert as NBC President James Kimbrough
- Wayne Knight as Newman
- Estelle Harris as Estelle Costanza
- Jerry Stiller as Frank Costanza
- Barney Martin as Morty Seinfeld
- Liz Sheridan as Helen Seinfeld
- Teri Hatcher as Sidra Holland

The rest were limited to cameo appearances, in many cases simply summarizing the events of the episode they appeared in to the courtroom or watching the trial in silence from the gallery. Geraldo Rivera, Jane Wells, and Keith Hernandez played themselves in the episode.

== Production ==
Seinfeld co-creator Larry David, who had left the series after season seven, returned to write this episode. This freed up co-creator and star Jerry Seinfeld, who had had his hands full running the show without David, to put together an opening stand-up comedy routine for the first time since David left the show.

Utmost secrecy was maintained around the production: the table read was held on one of the sets; immediately after the read, all but one copy of the script was destroyed; and the extras and studio audience were selected from among the producers' and cast's family and friends, all of whom were required to sign a legally binding agreement not to reveal the episode's details. A fake working title for this show, "A Tough Nut to Crack", was created to keep outsiders from discovering it was the finale. In addition, a fake version of the verdict scene was created in which the characters are found not guilty (although, as seen in an Easter egg on the season nine DVD set, this "alternate ending" was simply the broadcast version of the scene with the word "guilty" replaced by "not guilty", and stock footage of the Rosses inserted as a reaction shot).

Immediately prior to the live taping, Jerry Seinfeld said to his three co-stars: "For the rest of our lives, when anyone thinks of one of us, they will think of all four of us. And I can't think of three people I'd rather have that be true of." George actor Jason Alexander and Elaine actress Julia Louis-Dreyfus both recalled this speech in interviews decades later.

Initially, the episode ended with Jerry, George, Elaine and Kramer in their holding cell. David and Seinfeld decided at the last minute that this was the wrong note to end the series on, and came up with the closing stand-up scene, which was filmed after the wrap party had already taken place.

== Broadcast and reception ==
The top price for a 30-second commercial during the U.S. broadcast was approximately $1 million, marking the first time ever in American television history that a regular primetime television series (as well as a non-sport broadcast) had commanded at least $1-million advertising rate (previously attained only by Super Bowl general telecasts).

In its original American broadcast, 76.3 million viewers tuned into "The Finale", making it the fourth-most watched overall series finale in the U.S. after M*A*S*H, Cheers and The Fugitive. When this episode originally aired on NBC, TV Land paid tribute by not programming any shows opposite it, instead just showing a still shot of a closed office door with a pair of handwritten notes that said "We're TV Fans so... we're watching the last episode of Seinfeld. Will return at 10pm et, 7pm pt."

Entertainment Weekly's Ken Tucker declared the episode "off-key and bloated", particularly criticizing the near-complete lack of jokes, and the lameness of the majority of what few jokes there were. He also found closing the series with a stern lesson in morals to be both misguided and unnecessary, pointing out that the characters had already suffered for most of the wrongdoings brought up in the trial. However, he praised Jerry's prison stand-up routine, and gave the episode a C−.

Larry David has consistently stated he has no regrets about how the show ended. A 2010 Time article reported that most viewers considered the episode "downright awful" and noted that the Seinfeld reunion during the seventh season of Curb Your Enthusiasm "was viewed by many as his attempt at a do-over." A 2021 Vanity Fair article recounted how "the next day, even the shock jocks on the radio were complaining about [the finale]." Co-creator Jerry Seinfeld has had more reservations about "The Finale" than David did, commenting that while bringing back all their favorite guest stars and crew was a fun thing to do, it did not make for good comedy. Their differing views were referenced in the seventh-season finale of Curb Your Enthusiasm, in which Jerry says "We already screwed up one finale" with David responding "we didn't screw up a finale; that was a good finale!" Jason Alexander has said that people have often expressed dissatisfaction with the Seinfeld finale to him. In 2007, David said if he were to redo it he would have kept the plot of the finale less of a secret, since this heightened expectations. Michael Richards said that these expectations were distracting and negatively affected his performance.

In the final Top Ten List of the Late Show with David Letterman in 2015, presenter Julia Louis-Dreyfus jokingly criticized the episode by thanking Letterman for letting her take part in "another hugely disappointing series finale", much to the faux chagrin of fellow presenter Jerry Seinfeld, who had workshopped the joke with Letterman's writers.

The original broadcast occurred on the same night Frank Sinatra died. The 9-1-1 call was received at 9:14 pm, and the ambulance made it over to his house in just four minutes, then arrived at Cedars-Sinai Medical Center at 9:35 pm. Beverly Hills fire chief Mike Smollen attributed the especially fast response time to the streets being empty, as many people were watching the episode.

== Syndication version ==
Since the episode originally aired in a highly unorthodox 75-minute time slot, when packaged for syndication it was edited down to two episodes with 30-minute time slots. This version cut several scenes from the original episode and rearranged some parts, including the testimonies of Donald Sanger and George Steinbrenner, the scene between Jerry and Elaine before the jury re-enters the courtroom, Jerry's opening stand-up comedy act, and the scene in Monk's Cafe. The scene with Jerry, Elaine, George and Kramer having a meal in their cell was used for the credits of the first part.

== See also ==
- It Ain't Seinfeld – a professional wrestling event staged on the same night the finale aired
- "No Lessons Learned" – The series finale of Curb Your Enthusiasm
