= Steve Koren =

American screenwriter

- Education: Binghamton University
- Occupation: Screenwriter

Steve Koren is an American writer/producer and screenwriter. Most notably, he has written for Saturday Night Live, Seinfeld, and Veep. He also wrote or co-wrote the movies Bruce Almighty, Click, A Night at the Roxbury, and Superstar.

In addition, he has contributed to Curb Your Enthusiasm (specifically, the "Palestinian Chicken" episode).

Koren is a native of Queens, New York, and attended Benjamin N. Cardozo High School in Bayside, Queens.

== Career ==
After college, he began his career as an NBC page gathering coffee for the other employees. Among his other duties as a page was working for Saturday Night Live. As a Rockefeller Center tour guide, Koren would hand jokes to David Letterman and Dennis Miller as they passed in the hall, which landed him a writing gig on SNL 1992, midway through the show's 17th season. He also occasionally acted for the series.

While at SNL, he wrote/co-wrote Weekend Update and Adam Sandler’s The Denise Show; Koren was one of five writers to have survived an overhaul in 1995, and wrote many of the recurring sketches from season 21 with a nearly brand new cast, such as Mary Katherine Gallagher, The Roxbury Guys, The Joe Pesci Show, Jim Carrey’s Hot Tub Lifeguard, among many other sketches. After being named a writer supervisor midway through season 21, Koren left the show at the end of the season in 1996, after 4½ years.

In addition, he helped write and performed on Adam Sandler’s Platinum debut album They’re All Gonna Laugh at You.

Later, he became a writer for Seinfeld, and wrote the episodes "The Abstinence", "The English Patient", "The Serenity Now", and "The Dealership". He was also one of the contributors to the teleplay for "The Frogger" and "The Puerto Rican Day".

In the episode "The Van Buren Boys", a character named Steve Koren is George Costanza's choice for the first Susan Biddle Ross Scholarship to be granted by the Susan Ross Foundation.

Koren has executive-produced several films such as Adam Sandler's Grown Ups (2010), Just Go with It (2011), Blended (2014), and Pixels (2015). Koren also wrote the movie Superstar, starring Molly Shannon and Will Ferrell.

== Filmography ==
=== Writing credits ===
- Saturday Night Live (TV) (1992–1996)
- Seinfeld (TV) (1996–1998)
- A Night at the Roxbury (1998) (co-written with Will Ferrell and Chris Kattan)
- Superstar (1999) (written as Steven Wayne Koren)
- Everything But the Girl (TV movie) (2001)
- Bruce Almighty (2003) (co-written with Mark O'Keefe and Steve Oedekerk)
- Click (2006) (co-written with Mark O'Keefe)
- Fishy (short film) (2006)
- Jack and Jill (2011) (co-written with Adam Sandler and Robert Smigel)
- A Thousand Words (2012)
- Veep (2016)

=== Acting credits ===
- Seinfeld:

"The Millennium" (May 1, 1997) - as the character Steve Koren
"The Dealership" (January 8, 1998) - as the Cab Driver
"The Finale" (May 14, 1998) - as a Juror

- Fishy (short film) (2006) - as Dad
- Pixels (film) (2015) - as White House Reporter #3

== Awards and nominations ==
- Emmy Award nominee (1992, 1993) for Outstanding Individual Achievement in Writing in a Variety or Music Program; the nomination was shared with other writers for Saturday Night Live
- Emmy Award nominee (1998) for Outstanding Comedy Series; the nomination was shared with other writers for Seinfeld
