= Spike Feresten =

American (born 1964)

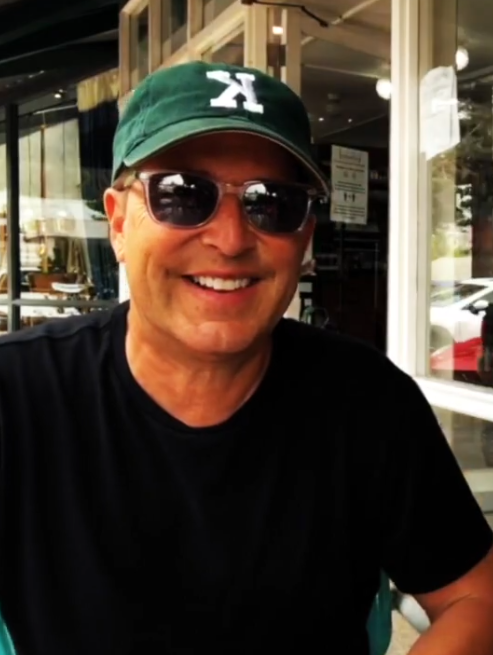
- Feresten in 2021
- Born: 1963 or 1964 (age 61–62); Fall River, Massachusetts, U.S.
- Occupations: Screenwriter; television personality
- Years active: 1980s–present
- Relatives: Wally Feresten (brother)

Spike Feresten (born 1963 or 1964) is an American television writer, screenwriter, comedian and television personality, who worked on Seinfeld, wrote for David Letterman, and hosted the late night Talkshow with Spike Feresten from 2006 to 2009 on Fox. He is the former host of Esquire Network's series Car Matchmaker with Spike Feresten. He currently hosts the podcast Spike's Car Radio with Paul Zuckerman. He was also a screenwriter for the 2007 animated film Bee Movie.

== Early life and career ==
Feresten was born in Fall River, Massachusetts and raised in West Bridgewater, Massachusetts, where he attended public schools. He lived with his parents, Mary Jo and Michael, and younger brother, Wally Feresten. Feresten then attended Berklee College of Music in Boston, where he planned to prepare for a career in music. However, according to Feresten, while there he was kicked out of his dormitory for dropping light bulbs out of his eighth story window, before seeing David Letterman perform the same stunt on his show a few weeks later. "I thought, 'God, he is getting paid. This is what network television pays you to do. Maybe I need to think twice about this music career.'" Feresten dropped out of college in order to attempt a career in television, working first as an intern at NBC in New York City, before being promoted to receptionist.

Feresten began his career writing for Saturday Night Live, where he first got the nickname "Spike" while working there as a receptionist. "It came from 'Saturday Night Live'. I was a receptionist, and I had hair licks. And one of the PAs at the time gave me the nickname. And I said, "No problem as long as you don't fire me. Call me whatever you want." According to Feresten, he started writing for the show when Dennis Miller, who was hosting "Weekend Update", started using jokes that Feresten was passing on to him. "I think my first joke had something to do with Oliver North. I can't remember it. But I remember once it aired, it was like smoking crack."

He moved from there to the writing staff of Late Night with David Letterman and then later the Late Show with David Letterman. Describing the process of working for Letterman:

It's a lot of fun. You come in and read a couple newspapers and start your day with a nice appetizer of opening remarks. And during the day, you get these different writing assignments. We would write four to eight pages of jokes a day -- and at a moment's notice might be flying off to the Daytona 500 with Mujibur and Sirajul.

In the 1990s, he wrote for the cult cartoon spoof talk show, Space Ghost Coast to Coast, which process he described as:

Two things: First you pitch them an idea that you want to do. Once they say they like the direction you are going, there is a lot of creative freedom, so they let you write it. They send you a list of people they have interviewed as guests. They have already done the interviews. They have the voice of Space Ghost ask a bunch of questions and they have a bunch of responses. You can pick your guest and see if it works within the premise of your show then you get to re-write the questions.

Feresten went on to write for The Dana Carvey Show, before getting his big break with The Simpsons and Seinfeld in 1995.

Feresten wrote one episode for The Simpsons during its seventh season, called "Sideshow Bob's Last Gleaming", which aired on November 26, 1995, in which Sideshow Bob escapes once again from prison and takes control of a TV screen at an airshow, demanding all television stations immediately go off the air. Feresten has said that while he wrote and was credited for the script, it was completely rewritten keeping only the basic ideas intact, as that was usual writing process for the show.

== Work on Seinfeld ==
In 1995, Feresten left the late-night realm to join the writing staff of the hugely successful sitcom Seinfeld during the show's seventh season, and stayed there for three seasons until the show's finale, becoming supervising producer in 1998. During his tenure at Seinfeld, Feresten received three Emmy nominations, including one for his famed episode, "The Soup Nazi". The episodes he wrote were:

Season 7

- "The Soup Nazi"
- "The Wig Master"

Season 8

- "The Little Kicks"
- "The Andrea Doria"
- "The Muffin Tops"

Season 9

- "The Junk Mail"
- "The Reverse Peephole"
- "The Bookstore"
- "The Puerto Rican Day"

=== Television work post-Seinfeld ===
After Seinfeld ended in 1998, Spike went to work writing on pilots (including one with Louis C.K.) and the short-lived The Michael Richards Show, as well as enjoying a short stint as producer of The Jamie Kennedy Experiment, which ended in April 2004.

== Talkshow with Spike Feresten ==
In 2006, Feresten began his own talk-show on Saturday nights on Fox called Talkshow with Spike Feresten. While originally envisioned as an entertainment news parody, "Talkshow" developed into a mix of traditional talkshow segments with sketch elements, field pieces, fake commercials and pop culture parodies. Feresten described the show's format to Variety magazine as being, "all the comedy you'd find in a talkshow, but without any of the talk." Notable guests on the show included Tom Green, Jerry Seinfeld, Jason Alexander, Julia Louis-Dreyfus, Seth MacFarlane, Alex Borstein, Andy Richter, Tom Arnold, Carl Reiner, Tim Heidecker, Vanilla Ice and Eric Wareheim. On the process of finding guests for the show, Feresten admitted: "We call friends. Sometimes we are very close to having our receptionist on the air. But because we're not guest driven, we just seek out funny people that we know."

It ran for three seasons, making it the longest-running late night television show in the history of the Fox network. From January 17, 2006, to February 21, 2009, the show had a six-week test run of hour-long episodes airing an hour earlier than usual; this came in the wake of the cancellation of MADtv. The show was cancelled in May 2009.
