= David Mandel =

American writer, director, producer, and actor

- Born: September 24, 1970 (age 55)
- Education: Harvard University (AB)
- Occupations: Writer; actor; director; producer
- Years active: 1992–present
- Notable work: Seinfeld; Curb Your Enthusiasm; Veep; EuroTrip; The Cat in the Hat
- Spouse: Rebecca Whitney (m. 2007)
- Children: 2

David Mandel (born 1969 or 1970 (age 55–56)) is an American writer, actor, director, and producer.

== Early life and education ==
Mandel was raised in New York. He graduated from the Horace Mann School in 1988, before obtaining a bachelor's degree from Harvard University in 1992, where he worked for the Harvard Lampoon.

== Career ==
He was an executive producer and showrunner of Veep, and also an executive producer and director of Curb Your Enthusiasm and Seinfeld. He is also a comedian, and one of the producer-directors of the teen comedy EuroTrip. He was a writer for Seinfeld during its seventh, eighth, and ninth seasons and also co-wrote the screenplay for the 2003 film adaptation of The Cat in the Hat. He is one of the creators of Clerks: The Animated Series, and he was a writer for Saturday Night Live. He had a brief stint as a host of Dave and Steve's Video Game Explosion, a comedy video game review show that aired late nights on TBS as part of the Burly Bear Network. The show only lasted a few episodes before the entire block was canceled.

Mandel is also one of the authors of Star Wars Art: Ralph McQuarrie, a comprehensive collection of Star Wars artwork by Ralph McQuarrie, published in 2016 by Abrams Books.

Since October 2020, Mandel has hosted the podcast The Stuff Dreams Are Made Of, detailing movie props and collectables with writer Ryan Condal.

== Personal life ==
Mandel married Rebecca Whitney, a pediatrician, in 2007, who he met while a student at Harvard. The couple has two kids.

Mandel is Jewish.

== Filmography ==
Title	Year	Credited as			Notes
Title	Year	Director	Writer	Producer	Notes
1992–1995	Saturday Night Live	No	Yes	No	
1995–1998	Seinfeld	No	Yes	Yes	
2000–2002	Clerks: The Animated Series	No	Yes	Yes	
2003	The Cat in the Hat	No	Yes	No	
2004	EuroTrip	Uncredited	Yes	Yes	
2005–2011	Curb Your Enthusiasm	Yes	Yes	Yes	
2012	The Dictator	No	Yes	Yes	
2012	The Simpsons	No	Yes	No	
2013	Clear History	No	Yes	No	
2015	The Comedians	Yes	No	No	
2016–2019	Veep	Yes	Yes	Yes	
2023	White House Plumbers	Yes	No	Yes	

== Seinfeld-related credits ==
Mandel wrote the Seinfeld episode "The Bizarro Jerry", and on the commentary track to the DVD, has stated that this was his favorite Seinfeld of the episodes he wrote.

=== Writer ===
- "The Pool Guy"
- "The Friar's Club"
- "The Bizarro Jerry"
- "The Abstinence"
- "The Susie"
- "The Butter Shave"
- "The Voice"
- "The Betrayal"
- "The Maid"
- "The Puerto Rican Day"
