= Andy Ackerman =

American television director (born 1956)

- Born: Robert Andrew Ackerman; September 19, 1956 (age 70); Los Angeles, California, U.S.
- Education: Santa Clara University
- Occupations: Television director; script editor; television producer
- Years active: 1979–present
- Spouse: Betsy Ackerman
- Children: 4

Robert Andrew Ackerman (born September 19, 1956) is an American director, producer, and script editor who worked on Seinfeld, The New Adventures of Old Christine and the HBO series Curb Your Enthusiasm.

== Early life and education ==
Ackerman was born in Los Angeles, California. His father Robert was a lithographer, and his mother Rosemary was a substitute teacher and homemaker. He was raised in Glendale. He attended Loyola High School in Los Angeles before graduating from Santa Clara University in 1978 with a degree in general humanities.

== Career ==
Ackerman began his career as a videotape editor on WKRP in Cincinnati (1979–82) and Newhart, winning an Emmy for the former. He also served as an assistant editor on Welcome Back, Kotter. He replaced Tom Cherones as director of Seinfeld starting in its sixth season, ultimately directing 89 episodes.

Ackerman directed every episode of The New Adventures of Old Christine, and has directed or guest directed such series as Everybody Loves Raymond, Becker, Cheers, Wings, Frasier, Two and a Half Men, Andy Richter Controls the Universe, Perfect Couples, Whitney and The Ellen Show. He also directed the pilot episode of the 2006 Fox series Happy Hour.

Ackerman has received 15 Primetime Emmy Awards nominations, winning three.

== Personal life ==
Ackerman is a Catholic. He and his wife Betsy, also a Santa Clara University graduate, have four children.

== Filmography ==
TV series

Year	Title	Director	Producer	Notes
2025	Leanne	Yes	No	Episode: "Too Much Wedding Ring"
2024	Poppa's House	Yes	Executive	Episode: "Pilot"
2020	Indebted	Yes	Executive	
2019	Mr. Iglesias	Yes	No	Episode: "Some Children Left Behind"
2019	Santa Clarita Diet	Yes	No	Episode "More of a Cat Person"
2018	The Conners	Yes	No	2 episodes
2018–2019	Happy Together	Yes	No	6 episodes
2018	Living Biblically	Yes	Executive	12 episodes
2017	Marlon	Yes	Executive	
2016–2017	The Great Indoors	Yes	Executive	
2016–2017	Grace & Frankie	Yes	No	2 episodes
2014–2015	Mulaney	Yes	No	
2011–2013	Whitney	Yes	Executive	
2010–2011	Perfect Couples	Yes	Executive	
2007–2008	Rules of Engagement	Yes	Executive	
2006–2010	The New Adventures of Old Christine	Yes	Executive	
2006	Happy Hour	Yes	No	
2005	Hot Properties	Yes	No	
2005	Life on a Stick	Yes	No	
2004–2005	Center of the Universe	Yes	No	
2004	Listen Up	Yes	No	
2004	Come to Papa	Yes	Executive	
2004	Spellbound	No	Executive	
2003	Two and a Half Men	Yes	Executive	
2003	The O'Keefes	Yes	No	
2003	Watching Ellie	Yes	No	
2002–2003	Andy Richter Controls the Universe	Yes	Executive	
2001	The Ellen Show	Yes	Yes	
2001	Raising Dad	Yes	No	
2000–2009	Curb Your Enthusiasm	Yes	No	
2000–2005	Everybody Loves Raymond	Yes	No	
2000–2001	The Trouble with Normal	Yes	Yes	
1999	It's Like, You Know...	Yes	No	
1998–2003	Becker	Yes	Yes	
1998	LateLine	Yes	Yes	
1997	Jenny	Yes	No	
1996	Public Morals	Yes	No	
1996	Suddenly Susan	Yes	No	
1996	Ellen	Yes	No	
1996	Good Company	Yes	No	
1995	Almost Perfect	Yes	No	
1995	Dweebs	Yes	No	
1994–1998	Seinfeld	Yes	No	
1994	Muddling Through	Yes	No	
1993–1995	Frasier	Yes	No	
1993	Big Wave Dave's	Yes	No	
1991–1994	Wings	Yes	Yes	
1991	Roc	Yes	No	
1988–1991	Cheers	Yes	Co-producer	Also editor

TV movies

Year	Title	Director	Executive Producer
2005	Uncommon Sense	Yes	No
2005	Peep Show	Yes	No
2006	Separate at Worth	Yes	No
2007	The Hill	Yes	No
2008	Starting Under	Yes	Yes
2009	The Big D	Yes	No
