= MythBusters (2009 season) =

- No. of episodes: 23 (includes 3 specials)

Release
- Original network: Discovery Channel
- Original release: April 8 – December 28, 2009

Season chronology
- ← Previous; 2008 season Next → 2010 season

The cast of the television series MythBusters perform experiments to verify or debunk urban legends, old wives' tales, and the like. This is a list of the various myths tested on the show as well as the results of the experiments (the myth is busted, plausible, or confirmed).

== Episode overview ==
No. overall	No. in season	Title	Original release date	Overall episode No.
114	1	"Demolition Derby"	April 8, 2009	128
Myths tested: When a bus is moving at over 50 miles per hour, will moving passengers to the inside of the turn keep the bus from flipping? Will a fruit stand drive through, chain link gate crash, caravan collision, and semi trailer shave leave the driver unharmed and able to continue in a high-speed pursuit? Will a car dropped from 4,000 feet fall faster than a speeding car? Can two big rigs that collide head on completely flatten a compact car between them? Note: This is a double-length special episode.
115	2	"Alaska Special" "Alaska Special 2"	April 15, 2009	129
Myths tested: Is pykrete tougher than ice, bulletproof, and durable enough to make a boat out of? Can a V-shaped snowplow really split a car in two? Note: This is a special episode.
116	3	"Banana Slip/Double-Dip"	April 22, 2009	130
Myths tested: Can a banana peel really cause one to slip? Does double dipping cause germ warfare? Can you really make a homemade diamond?
117	4	"YouTube Special"	April 29, 2009	131
Myths tested: Do match heads alone have the explosive punch to fire a homemade cannon? Can a 7-foot ball of Lego blocks become a rolling weapon of mass destruction? Can a car tire burst into flames if it spins fast enough? Note: This is a special YouTube-themed episode.
118	5	"Swimming in Syrup"	May 6, 2009	132
Myths tested: Can a person swim faster in syrup than in water? Can two targets be hit with one shot by splitting a bullet on an axe blade? Can a steel door be blown open by the gunpowder from six bullets?
119	6	"Exploding Bumper"	May 13, 2009	133
Myths tested: Can a car bumper explode? Did Hungarian archers get twice the penetration shooting a bow from a galloping horse?
120	7	"Seesaw Saga"	May 20, 2009	134
Myths tested: Could a skydiver whose parachute failed to open hit a playground seesaw and send a small girl flying seven stories high, and she could still survive?
121	8	"Thermite vs. Ice"	May 27, 2009	135
Myths tested: Could thermite placed on top of blocks of ice set off an explosion? Could a car stereo set off an SKS rifle? Could a person's thumb be severed while firing a hunting pistol?
122	9	"Prison Escape"	June 3, 2009	136
Myths tested: Could a human hang on to the roof of a speeding car? Can dental floss be used to cut through the steel bars of a prison? Can a prisoner fire the ball from his ball-and-chain via a ceremonial cannon, launch himself over the prison wall, and survive?
123	10	"Curving Bullets"	June 10, 2009	137
Myths tested: Can a sonic shock wave shatter glass? Is it possible to bend bullets around obstacles, like in the movie Wanted?
124	11	"Car vs. Rain"	June 17, 2009	138
Myths tested: Will driving a convertible faster in the rain help a person stay drier than stopping and putting the top on? Can popcorn be cooked with lasers or explosions?
125	12	"Knock Your Socks Off"	October 7, 2009	139
Myths tested: If one bullet is fired horizontally and the other is dropped vertically, simultaneously from the same height, will they hit the ground at the same time? Can someone really be knocked out of their socks?
126	13	"Duct Tape Hour"	October 14, 2009	140
Myths tested: Is it possible to lift a car using nothing but duct tape? Can duct tape plug holes in the bottom of boats? Can you create a working sail-boat out of duct tape? Can duct tape be used to construct a potato cannon instead of glue? Is it possible to build a working cannon using duct tape?
127	14	"Clean Car vs. Dirty Car"	October 21, 2009	141
Myths tested: Does a dirty car get better gas mileage than a clean one? Why are dimples crucial to the flight of golf balls? Is a hangover caused by beer less severe than one caused by a mixture of beer and liquor?
128	15	"Greased Lightning"	October 28, 2009	142
Myths tested: Can a 30-foot fireball be created with an oil pan fire? Does microwaving C-4 cause it to explode? Can cheese fired from a cannon pierce a sail?
129	16	"Hurricane Windows"	November 4, 2009	143
Myths tested: Will opening all of the windows of a house during a hurricane lessen the damage caused to the structure? Will a human head that has been dipped in liquid nitrogen for 5 seconds shatter when slammed into a table? Will a Christmas tree explode if frozen using liquid nitrogen?
130	17	"Crash and Burn"	November 11, 2009 (US); November 2, 2009 (UK)	144
Myths tested: Does a car explode when driven off a cliff? Can a huge rocket launch a cage holding a human, and would the person survive?
131	18	"Myth Evolution"	November 18, 2009	145
Myths tested: Can an exploding water heater pass through the second story of a house? Can a person shoot around a corner accurately using a variety of methods? Can someone hold on to a car while being driven through cardboard boxes? Can liquid nitrogen be used to pick a lock? Can a rocket-powered snowplow split a car in two?
132	19	"Dumpster Diving"	November 25, 2009	146
Myths tested: Can a person jump from a rooftop into a dumpster and walk away? Can a deep-sea diver's body be crushed into his helmet if his air hose breaks? Note: Kari Byron goes on maternity leave and Jessi Combs joins the Build Team as her replacement.
133	20	"Antacid Jail Break"	December 2, 2009	147
Myths tested: Can antacid tablets be used to blow a prison cell open? Can a person drive safely on a moonless night without using his headlights?
134	21	"Unarmed and Unharmed"	December 9, 2009	148
Myths tested: Can a cowboy shoot a gun out of a person's hand without injuring him? Is the 50-foot bus jump seen in Speed possible in real life?
135	22	"Hidden Nasties"	December 16, 2009	149
Myths tested: Can you skip a car over a lake? Is a toilet seat cleaner than other household items?
136	23	"Mini-Myth Mayhem"	December 28, 2009	150
Myths tested: Can you mail a coconut without packaging? Can you light a match with a bullet? Can you make a candle out of earwax? Can you make someone urinate involuntarily by putting their hand in a bowl of warm water while they sleep? Can you make your own gunpowder, shoot it out of a bamboo cannon, and walk away? Can you touch molten lead without burning your skin? Note: This episode is dedicated to Erik Gates, who died in a construction accident unrelated to rocketry.

== Episode 114 – "Demolition Derby" ==
- Original air date: April 8, 2009

This episode was an 87-minute-long special. The vehicles that were demolished during the episode all received an end credit in the form of an in memoriam (spelled in memorium onscreen).

=== Need for Speed ===
Myth statement	Status	Notes
While a city bus is turning at 50 miles per hour (80 km/h), all the passengers need to move to the inside of the turn if the bus is to stay upright (inspired by a scene in Speed).	Busted	In their initial test, Adam and Jamie placed several barrels filled with water inside the bus to match the weight of the nineteen passengers seen in the film. They then placed all of the barrels on the right side of the bus and performed a right-hand turn at 50 miles per hour. The bus barely managed to make the turn but successfully managed not to flip over. They then performed a second test with the weight evenly distributed in order to confirm the first test, but the bus failed to flip, proving that weight distribution was not necessary and busting the myth. In order to flip the bus, Adam and Jamie distributed all of the weight to the outside of the bus to shift the center of gravity, added steel weights to the roof to make it top heavy, and added a valve to deflate the left-side air suspension to further shift the weight of the vehicle.

=== Hollywood Crash Test ===
With these tests based on numerous car chase scenes in films, the Build Team tested myths based on whether cars would be able to successfully drive through/into various obstructions. Two criteria were used to test each scenario: whether the real crash appeared similar to its Hollywood counterpart, and whether the car could be driven away afterward. They crashed into...

Myth statement	Status	Notes
...a fruit stand.	Busted	The car completely demolished the fruit stand, but it was no longer drivable after sustaining heavy damage to its hood.
...a locked chain link gate.	Plausible	The car successfully crashed through the gate, but it suffered some damage and triggered its airbags. However, the car was still drivable.
...a camper trailer.	Busted	The impact completely demolished both the trailer and the car, rather than the car making a clean hole through the trailer as seen in movies.
...the cavity between the ground and a big rig trailer, tearing the roof off.	Plausible	The trailer tore the roof off the car, but the car's brakes failed and it rolled past the end of the test course and fell off an earthen berm. After examining the video, the team decided that the car looked drivable after passing under the trailer, and rated this plausible.

=== Car Drop Chaos ===
Myth statement	Status	Notes
A car driving at 142 miles per hour (229 km/h) can beat an identical car falling at terminal velocity in a race at a distance of 4,000 feet (1,200 m). This myth is based on a car advertisement.	Busted	The Build Team first dropped a car from a crane to see how it would behave in freefall. They found that, unlike in the commercial, the car would not fall evenly and would hit the ground front first. They distributed the weight of the car evenly to solve this. For the test, the Build Team dropped a car from a helicopter, while a remote-controlled car drove at 140 miles per hour (225 km/h) in an attempt to beat it. Because the driven car could achieve a top speed of only 105 miles per hour (169 km/h), the Build Team had to shorten the ground distance to 2,950 feet (900 m) to compensate. During the experiment, the falling car beat the ground car in covering the distance.

=== Compact Compact Supersized ===
Myth statement	Status	Notes
Two big rigs that collide head-on can completely flatten a compact car between them.	Busted	This was a revisit of season 3's Compact Compact due to the failure to successfully complete the experiment the first time. The MythBusters rebuilt the entire crash rig. The test was successful, with both trucks crashing head-on and pancaking the compact. However, the car was pushed out of the collision zone rather than staying between the trucks, and the trucks did not fuse together as stated in the myth. To learn what would be required to pancake and fuse a compact, the MythBusters decided to ram a compact with a rocket sled. The rocket sled struck the compact car at a speed of 648 miles per hour (1,043 km/h), completely disintegrating the compact car. However, the impact did not achieve the fusion they were looking for. In order to see what it would take to fuse two pieces of metal together, the MythBusters demonstrated explosion welding, where metal could be fused by using high explosives. Since trucks cannot travel faster than sound, nor can high explosives be easily found on a highway, the myth was busted.

== Episode 115 – "Alaska Special" ==
- Original air date: April 15, 2009

As part of Discovery Channel's Alaska Week 2009 series, the MythBusters returned to Alaska to test more cold weather myths.

=== Pykrete Peril ===
With this myth being based on Geoffrey Pyke's proposed project of building an aircraft carrier out of pykrete during World War II, which was never put into practice because the war ended, the MythBusters decided to test the viability of making a pykrete boat.

Myth statement	Status	Notes
Pykrete is bulletproof.	Confirmed	The MythBusters demonstrated that pykrete is bulletproof by subjecting a wastebasket-sized chunk of ice and another of pykrete to a close range impact (approximately 10 ft or 3.0 m) by a .45 caliber round. The ice shattered upon impact, and the bullet easily penetrated it. However, the pykrete chunk held together and successfully stopped and deflected the bullet while sustaining only a small (approximately 1 in or 2.5 cm deep) impact crater.
Pykrete is stronger than ice.	Confirmed	The MythBusters subjected ice and pykrete to a mechanical stress test where lead blocks were placed onto a cantilevered slab of each material to determine its breaking strength. The ice quickly failed when the weight exceeded 40 pounds (18 kg), while the pykrete had no problem supporting all 300 pounds (136 kg) of lead blocks the MythBusters had and took Jamie several additional hammer strikes to break. After this test, Jamie made a slab of "super pykrete" (made out of newspaper instead of wood pulp). It held the lead blocks and Adam's weight combined, even holding strong against repeated hammer strikes.
A working boat can be completely constructed with pykrete.	Plausible "but ludicrous"	The MythBusters first tested how long ice, pykrete, and Jamie's special "super pykrete" could last in warm water before melting. The super pykrete proved to last significantly longer, prompting Adam and Jamie to use that as their main building material. The MythBusters then built a full-size boat out of the super pykrete, dubbing it Yesterday's News, and subjected it to real-world conditions. Though the boat managed to float and stay intact at speeds of up to 23 miles per hour (37 km/h), it quickly began to spring leaks as it slowly melted. At twenty minutes in with the boat deteriorating, the experiment was pulled, and the boat lasted another ten minutes while being piloted back to shore. Though the boat worked, it was noted that it would be highly impractical for the original myth, which predicted that an entire aircraft carrier could be built out of pykrete. Adam and Jamie agreed to settle on a "plausible but ludicrous" conclusion.

In additional footage shown on the MythBusters website, two additional tests were shown.

- Blocks of ice and regular pykrete were placed on nails against a board at room temperature. The ice melted significantly faster than the pykrete.
- A "shock test" was performed on the three materials by dropping a block of each approximately six feet onto the ground. The block of ice shattered into many pieces. The block of regular pykrete broke into two pieces but did not shatter. The block of pseudo-pykrete would not break, even when slammed down from the same height.

=== Snowplow Split ===
Myth statement	Status	Notes
A V-shaped snowplow is capable of perfectly bifurcating a car front-to-rear in a head-on collision, while the driver and the passenger both escape unharmed.	Busted	Unable to find the necessary facilities in Alaska, the Build Team instead settled for a test location in Wisconsin. In their first test, the Build Team rammed a front engine car into the snowplow at 55 miles per hour (89 km/h). However, the snowplow failed to slice the car in two due to the thick engine block. In their second test, the Build Team used a rear engine car (made out of a front engine car with the engine relocated into the trunk), increased its speed to 70 miles per hour (113 km/h), and sharpened the edge of the snowplow to maximize the chances of slicing the car in two. Even though the front portion of the car was sliced in two, the snowplow again failed to cut through the engine block. Also, in both tests, the inflatable dummies representing the driver and the passenger did not escape unharmed, busting the myth. Since the test went so well, the Build Team also declared that the dreaded curse of the snowplow was busted as well.

== Episode 116 – "Banana Slip/Double-Dip" ==
- Original air date: April 22, 2009

=== Banana Peel Slip ===
Myth statement	Status	Notes
A single banana peel on the ground is guaranteed to cause the person who steps on it to slip and fall.	Busted	In their first test, a blindfolded Jamie (wearing proper protection) stepped on a banana peel while walking, but he did not slip. In the second test, multiple banana peels were laid down in Jamie's path, but he did not slip. He then tried running through the banana peels but still failed to slip. They then performed further tests by measuring a banana peel's static friction and kinetic friction and comparing it to lubricant, with the lubricant having far less kinetic friction but the banana peel having somewhat less static friction. In their full-scale test, the MythBusters built a racecourse that had the entire ground covered with banana peels, and later lubricant. They then compared how quickly and easily they could negotiate the course with banana peels and the lubricant, in which they both comically did poorly on when they ran the track without caution. In the end, the MythBusters decided that the myth was busted but just barely. Banana peels would not guarantee a fall but could still prove to be very slippery on a smooth enough surface.

=== Homemade Diamonds ===
The Build Team tested several myths that involve creating diamonds with household materials such as...

Myth statement	Status	Notes
...several chemicals such as graphite and ferric nitrate by combining them in a pressure cooker. This myth was inspired by the CSI: Miami episode "Lost Son."	Busted	Tory started by acquiring the required chemicals, as well as a diamond seed, and put them all into a pressure cooker, leaving the mix cooking for three days. However, he failed to obtain any results.
...peanut butter by using it to cover charcoal and heating it in a microwave oven.	Busted	Kari tried the method but failed to create any diamonds, despite managing to destroy two microwaves.
...molten graphite and iron by rapidly cooling it and soaking the iron in hydrochloric acid.	Busted	Grant performed the experiment but could not find any diamonds.

Unable to produce any diamonds by using household items, the Build Team went on to test whether...

Myth statement	Status	Notes
...explosives can compress graphite into diamonds.	Confirmed	The Build Team was invited to New Mexico Tech to see the demonstration, which used 5,000 lb (2,268 kg) of ANFO. This was the largest explosion to date on MythBusters, producing over twelve times the energy produced by the explosion that previously held the title (Cement Mix-up). They then performed a smaller scale blast and examined the results in the lab after a chemical bath. However, the process produces only cheap quality industrial diamonds. While those are still chemically diamonds, the Build Team agreed that this process was too impractical to attempt at home and that any homemade diamond scheme was too implausible.

=== Double Dipping ===
Myth statement	Status	Notes
The act of double-dipping a chip (and therefore transferring microbes from one's mouth into the dip on the second pass) is the equivalent of putting all of the dip directly into one's mouth. This myth was inspired by the Seinfeld episode "The Implant".	Busted	In their experiment, the MythBusters used chips with regular dip and salsa. In the control test, they put the untouched dip and salsa into petri dishes, and followed with double-dipped dip and salsa, and finally dip and salsa that had been put in Adam's and Jamie's mouths. However, when they examined their results, they found that the dip and salsa were already loaded with microbes. For a more accurate experiment, the MythBusters were forced to sterilize all their testing materials with radiation and create a sterile environment. Examining the results, the MythBusters found that double-dipping produced fewer microbes than putting all the dip in a person's mouth. Also, the number of microbes present was negligible compared to the number found in regular dip.

== Episode 117 – "YouTube Special" ==
- Original air date: April 29, 2009

Adam, Jamie, and the Build Team tested three myths drawn from videos seen on YouTube.

=== Match Bomb ===
Myth statement	Status	Notes
If the heads of 30,000 matches are gathered together and ignited, they will create a large fireball.	Confirmed	Adam and Jamie started with 30,000 paper safety matches and cut the heads off, collecting them in a 1-US-gallon (3.8 L) bucket. When these were ignited with a slow-burning fuse, they generated a fireball approximately 10 feet (3 m) high, confirming the myth. However, the person who submitted it had also asked what would happen if 1,000,000 heads were used, so the entire crew spent a day cutting off match heads to fill a 44-US-gallon (170 L) drum. These were then ignited to create an intensely bright 50-foot (15 m) fireball. Finally, Adam and Jamie built an improvised cannon out of a K-size argon cylinder and loaded it with 60,000 match heads, using a 6-pound (2.7 kg) bowling ball (shaved down to fit into the barrel) as the projectile. They aimed it at a rack of bowling pins and set it off, but the ball never hit the pins, instead sailing over them and flying 1,500 feet (460 m) uphill. Adam commented afterward that the cannon might have propelled the ball some 3,000 feet (910 m) on level ground.

=== LEGO Ball ===
Myth statement	Status	Notes
A 7-foot ball built from 5 million LEGO bricks can be easily pushed off the top of a hill, roll down, and bounce off a parked car without doing any damage.	Busted	Grant, Tory, and Kari investigated this myth in three parts: the number of bricks needed for a 7-foot (2 m) ball, whether its weight would make it hard to push around, and whether it would damage a car after rolling downhill. They managed to collect half a million bricks (donated by The LEGO Group) and calculated that a ball consisting of 5 million bricks would weigh 10 metric tons (22,000 lb), much too heavy for people to push unassisted. After borrowing another half a million bricks from private collector and artist Nathan Sawaya and expertise from Legoland California, the Build Team brought in every available crew member to put together the ball, which eventually weighed 3,000 pounds (1,400 kg), and found a road on which to roll it safely. They set up a downhill alley made of construction barricades, put a car at the bottom, and let the ball go; however, it crumbled into pieces long before reaching the car. All three parts of the myth were declared busted, and the Build Team conjectured that the people in the video may have used a large, hollow sphere as the core of their LEGO ball and glued the pieces to it. This would have made the LEGO sphere far easier to push and far less likely to break up or damage a car on impact. In the original video, the ball was made of sculpted Styrofoam. The creators of the video sought the advice of LEGO Master Model Builders and claimed that they gave them the one-million piece estimate, though the company claims it never gave them such an estimate.

=== Spinning Tire Fire ===
Myth statement	Status	Notes
A car tire can be spun so fast that friction with the ground will cause it to not only smoke but actually catch fire.	Busted	Adam and Jamie found a high-performance car (a Pontiac Firebird) and set it up to run in place, with only one tire spinning in contact with the ground. In the first test, Jamie revved the engine to top speed, causing the tire to emit thick smoke and eventually burst. No flames were observed at the time; however, after a lunch break, they discovered that some of the rubber particles had smoldered and built up enough heat to ignite. Believing that a spark might be needed to get the tire to burn, Adam set up an angle grinder and turned it on as Jamie stepped on the gas pedal for the second test. The tire did not blow out or burn this time, so for the third test, Adam hooked up a container to leak gasoline onto the tire as it spun and the grinder threw sparks. Again there was no fire, and Jamie theorized that the air turbulence caused by the spinning tire was preventing the gasoline from igniting. With no flames generated during any test, Adam and Jamie declared the myth busted.

=== Homemade Surround Sound ===
This myth was not shown in the actual episode aired in the United States, but it was featured in the version of the episode aired outside North America and on the MythBusters website and included in the iTunes download as an extra scene. It was based on a video created by the YouTube user Household Hacker.

Myth statement	Status	Notes
A person can make a working speaker out of a paper plate, tin foil, a penny, and a minijack, for under a dollar.	Busted	Tory built the homemade speakers according to the Household Hacker's specifications and created his own surround sound setup, but when he turned on the music, the speakers did not work. When Kari suggested that there might not be enough electricity to power all the speakers at once, Tory used only a single speaker but failed to get any sound again. The homemade speakers clearly did not work, and Tory also pointed out that the boast that these homemade speakers cost less than one dollar each was not true. A single minijack alone costs around ten dollars, and Tory's entire homemade surround sound set cost $150 to build.

== Episode 118 – "Swimming in Syrup" ==
- Original air date: May 6, 2009

Adam and Jamie explored the physics of swimming in syrup, while the Build Team probed two "magic bullet" myths.

=== Swimming in Syrup ===
Myth statement	Status	Notes
It is possible to swim as fast through syrup as through water.	Plausible	Adam and Jamie began by digging two long trenches and lining them with plastic sheeting to serve as swimming pools. They filled one with water and the other with syrup made from 750 pounds (340 kg) of guar gum and 10,000 US gallons (38,000 L) of water. Adam and Jamie each swam three lengths in the water to establish their benchmark average times, then did the same in the syrup. Adam's time in syrup was 28% slower than in water; Jamie tired quickly and withdrew from further testing. Thinking that the high viscosity of the syrup may have affected the results, Adam and Jamie replaced it with a mixture that was only slightly more viscous than water. Adam again swam three lengths in each pool and found that his syrup time was now only 2.8% slower than in water. A third batch, this one about as viscous as maple syrup, was prepared for both Adam and Olympic gold medalist swimmer Nathan Adrian. Adam and Nathan swam 5.4% and 9% slower here than in water, respectively (though Adam and Jamie decided to disregard Nathan's results, since he was so familiar with swimming in water that he lost his technique in the syrup and thus could not deliver a consistent performance). Based on the results for light and medium syrup, which they considered to be within the margin of error for their testing method, Adam and Jamie declared the myth plausible.

=== MacGyver's Magic Bullets ===
Myth statement	Status	Notes
It is possible to blow open a lock by packing it with the gunpowder from six revolver cartridges, fitting an empty cartridge casing to it, and hitting the primer with the butt of a gun (based on the MacGyver episode "The Wish Child").	Busted	The Build Team first explored the idea of simply shooting the lock to get it open. They set up a locked steel door and a .38 caliber revolver, and they were surprised to find that their first shot damaged the lock sufficiently to let them open the door. Based on the details shown in the episode, they began to test the myth piece by piece: first trying to pull the slugs out of the rounds with their fingers, then trying to set off the case primers by hitting them with the revolver butts. Both of these proved impossible, so they took apart six .38 rounds, collected a total of 30 grains (1.9 g) of smokeless powder from them, and packed it (wrapped in a piece of cloth) into the keyhole of a second door along with a live primer. A firing pin was fitted into a gun butt and swung at the primer; after a few adjustments, including the use of black powder instead of smokeless, the Build Team was able to set off the powder in this manner. However, the door lock remained intact. Finally, they packed the keyhole with 600 grains (39 g) of black powder (equivalent to 120 rounds) and used an electric igniter to set it off. The resulting explosion blew the lock apart, proving the concept feasible, if not the exact circumstances. The team declared the myth busted due to the sheer amount of gunpowder needed, and then the team proceeded to destroy the entire door with a charge of C-4.

=== Davy Crockett's Magic Bullet ===
Myth statement	Status	Notes
Davy Crockett could fire a shot from his musket and split the bullet on the blade of an axe stuck in a tree 40 yards away.	Confirmed	After setting up a target and sticking an axe in it, the Build Team received training from an expert in antique American firearms and began shooting from 40 yards (37 m). Each member took three shots, moving up to 20 yards (18 m) after Tory went first. Although several bullets nicked the blade or handle, none split on it until Tory tried again with a stand at the shorter distance. With one bullet hole appearing on either side of the blade, the team declared the myth confirmed and decided that a person could consistently make the 40-yard shot with enough practice. The expert then made the shot from a standing position, cleanly bursting two balloons placed to either side of the blade.

== Episode 119 – "Exploding Bumper" ==
- Original air date: May 13, 2009

=== Exploding Bumpers ===
Myth statement	Status	Notes
A car bumper can explode in a car fire and fly across 50 feet (15 m) to knee-cap a person.	Busted	Adam and Jamie started with finding out the temperature a car fire could reach. They set fire to a car with gasoline and measured the temperature with a thermographic camera, getting readings over 1,000 °F (540 °C). They then determined that the blaze reached 1,400 °C (2,600 °F), enough by far to melt the aluminium bumper but surprisingly unable to make it explode. Suspecting that unfocused flames might have caused the explosion to fail, back in the shop, they subjected several bumper shocks to directional heat from an oxyacetylene torch at various spots. However, all shocks lost pressure in one way or another before they could explode. During the course, the MythBusters interviewed an Oakland firewoman who indeed suffered bumper knee-capping. However, in her accident, the bumper flew only 15 feet (4.6 m) instead of 50 feet as alleged in the myth. Finally, Adam and Jamie simulated a 50-foot bumper blast using a delicately engineered rig consisting of two pistons packed with gunpowder and wet sand and an electric ignition system, which demonstrated the improbability of such a blast under normal conditions.

=== Medieval Mayhem ===
Myth statement	Status	Notes
Hungarian archers got twice the penetration shooting a bow from a galloping horse than from shooting stationary.	Busted	The Build Team first attempted to test the myth by having trained horse archers firing at a foam target at varying speeds. However, they were unable to get consistent data because the three archers they tested all rode at different speeds, fired their arrows at different distances, and had varying arrow velocities. For a more conclusive test, the Build Team obtained a Jeep and mounted a crossbow on the top. They then fired arrows at a large foam target while stationary and then while the Jeep was driving at 40 miles per hour (64 km/h), in both cases from a fixed distance of 60 feet (18 m). While the arrows fired while the Jeep was moving did penetrate deeper into the target, they did not penetrate twice the distance of the arrows fired while stationary, busting the myth.

== Episode 120 – "Seesaw Saga" ==
- Original air date: May 20, 2009

Adam, Jamie, and the Build Team joined forces to investigate a puzzling seesaw myth. This is the second myth in which the MythBusters and the Build Team tested a myth together.

Myth statement	Status	Notes
A skydiver whose parachute fails to open can hit the high end of a playground seesaw, landing on his feet, and launch a child on the low end safely up to the roof of a 7-story building.	Busted	Adam and Jamie constructed a steel seesaw and placed a dummy on one end whose weight matched that of an average 6-year-old girl. To approximate the effect of a skydiver hitting the high end at terminal velocity, they calculated the proper combination of weight and height and dropped several water-filled barrels. The impact crushed the seesaw, ruptured the barrels, and launched the dummy to a height of 20 feet (6 m). The Build Team was brought in to determine the terminal velocity, based on one specific type of skydiving suit and the diver's body position. From several jumps, they determined that the diver could reach a maximum speed of 122 miles per hour (196 km/h) in a vertical position. Meanwhile, Adam and Jamie designed and built a seesaw that could effectively deliver the energy of the falling skydiver to the girl without buckling. Adam did some small-scale tests to correlate drop height and maximum launch height, and also to follow the girl's trajectory in the air. Next, the Build Team did some bungee jumping to find a way to accelerate the diver to terminal velocity without having to drop him from several hundred feet up. Their solution was to attach the ends of a heavy-duty bungee cord to the diver and the ground, haul the diver up using a crane, and release him so that the cord would snap him downward at high speed. A wetsuit filled with an alginate/water mixture and dressed in a skydiving suit was used to represent the diver. The team set up the equipment at Mare Island Naval Shipyard, using the heavy-duty bungee cord and a pair of guide wires to make sure the diver dummy would hit the target accurately, and found that they could indeed reach 122 miles per hour. The girl dummy was outfitted with "shock watch" stickers to measure the forces exerted on it, and three drops were carried out. These were the results: 1st: diver hit slightly off-center and burst on impact; girl flew 55 feet (17 m) up and 70 feet (21 m) laterally, but suffered enough force to kill her; 2nd: sand-filled inner tube used for diver; girl hit the guide wires; 3rd: girl flew 130 feet (40 m) up at an angle (equivalent of 200 feet or 60 meters straight up), but experienced a g-force of 42 g, which would cause serious injury even before she hit the ground; Based on the need for an extremely strong seesaw and the injuries inflicted on the girl, the team declared the myth busted.

== Episode 121 – "Thermite vs. Ice" ==
- Original air date: May 27, 2009

=== Thermite vs. Ice ===
Myth statement	Status	Notes
Igniting a bucket full of thermite on top of a pile of ice blocks will cause an explosion.	Confirmed	This was another viral video request, with the hypothesis that the explosion was not from the thermite/ice reaction but from a hidden pouch of black powder. However, when Adam and Jamie tested the myth as shown in the video (with one galvanized steel bucket full of thermite on top of ten 1-pound or 0.45-kilogram blocks of ice), an explosion did indeed occur, thus confirming the myth. Using more thermite and more ice resulted in a larger explosion, enough to literally rain down fire a few seconds afterward and send ice chunks flying over 150 feet (46 m). In a first for the show, however, no definitive explanation was given for why this occurred. Two options were suggested, including (1) the water molecules decomposing into hydrogen and oxygen molecules, forming a fuel-air mixture that ignited in the heat; and (2) the steam from the sublimating ice is aerosolizing the thermite itself, which then explodes. No one has been able to definitively prove exactly what happens to cause this mixture to be so volatile.

=== Woofer Weaponry ===
Myth statement	Status	Notes
The vibrations caused by a car stereo system at full blast is enough to trigger a misfire in an SKS rifle.	Busted	This myth originated from Russian gangs, who use an SKS rifle with a free-floating (as opposed to spring-return) firing pin. Supposedly, any large vibrations, such as from a loud car stereo system, can cause the firing pin to trigger and fire off round after round at random. To test this, the Build Team "pimped their ride" with the most advanced sound system they could get, and placed several of the appropriate rifles in different areas in the car before subjecting them to several decibel and tone levels worth of sound. However, none of the guns went off. Even taking the guns for testing at Meyer Sound and getting a custom car specifically designed for sound system contests—with a decibel level much higher than what Meyer Sound could produce—could not produce a result, thereby busting the myth.
The shock wave caused by an exploding bomb is enough to trigger a misfire in an SKS rifle.	Plausible	In a last-ditch effort to get the myth to work, the Build Team tested another, similar myth from the same source, involving an exploded bomb setting off guns placed around the blast zone. This time, one of the guns did fire from the shockwave of the explosion, but only one, proving that while vibrations can cause the guns to misfire, it takes a pressure wave much stronger than even the most powerful sound systems can produce to do it.

=== Handgun Horror ===
Myth statement	Status	Notes
Holding a hunting revolver improperly can cause a person's fingers to be blown off by the escaping gases emitted when the bullets are fired.	Confirmed	This myth came to the MythBusters in the form of a picture that was too graphic to show on-air. After testing the gun and noting the power of the gun's recoil and the gases that emitted from between the barrel and the chamber, Adam and Jamie built a pair of chicken hands to test the damage these gases can cause to an unprotected hand. While Jamie's less anatomically correct hand suffered only some minor flesh damage from the gases, Adam's hand—specifically created to mimic the bone and joint structure of a human hand—had one finger blown almost completely off, confirming the myth.

== Episode 122 – "Prison Escape" ==
- Original air date: June 3, 2009

=== Car Cling ===
Adam and Jamie tested whether or not a person could...

Myth statement	Status	Notes
...hold on to the roof of a car with the windows down while the car is zigzagging.	Confirmed	A safety rig was constructed in case Jamie could not hold on, but he was easily able to hold on to a car going 45 mph (72 km/h).
...hold on to the roof of a car with the windows up while the car is zigzagging.	Busted	Jamie could not hold on when the car was going 45 mph (72 km/h). The windows were up for all tests after this.
...hold on to the roof of a car while the car is making a big turn.	Busted	Jamie fell off when the car was going at just 15–20 mph (24–32 km/h).
...hold on to the roof of a car when it makes a sudden stop.	Busted	Jamie lost his grip and almost blacked out after a 45 mph (72 km/h) stop.
...hold on to the hood of a car while the car is zigzagging.	Busted	Adam fell off after the first swerve at just 20 mph (32 km/h).
...hold on to the hood of a car while the car is making a big turn.	Busted	Adam fell off immediately at only 20 mph (32 km/h).
...hold on to the hood of a car when it makes a sudden stop.	Confirmed	Adam was able to hold on to the hood at both 25 and 45 mph (40 and 72 km/h) stops.
...shake someone off the roof of a car by going through a car wash.	Busted	The car wash had no effect on Jamie except for the chilly 55 °F (13 °C) water.
...shake someone off the hood of a car by going through a car wash.	Busted	Adam easily held on to the hood.

=== Floss to Freedom ===
Myth statement	Status	Notes
Dental floss can be used to cut through the steel bars of a prison.	Plausible	Grant built a flossing robot, applied toothpaste to the bars (the grit used to clean one's teeth, they reasoned, could be used to aid the floss), and let it run for a week. After a week, the bar had been worn away a fraction of an inch, which, by Grant's calculations, meant that someone can cut through one bar in 293 days (just under ten months) if that person flossed eight hours per night.

=== Cannonball Escape ===
Myth statement	Status	Notes
An 18th-century prisoner placed the ball from his ball-and-chain into the prison's ceremonial cannon, fired himself over the prison wall, and survived.	Busted	After getting the specifications of a ball-and-chain for a 170-pound (77 kg) person (what the dummy weighed) from an expert, Tory built a homemade cannon for the ball. Using one shotgun shell full of black powder, they launched just the ball 80 yards (73 m), well over the fence. After Buster was attached to it and two shells were used, he flew an unspectacular 6 feet (1.8 m). Using rope to simulate hip ligaments, they fired again. Buster's leg was completely separated from his hip, leaving this myth busted.

== Episode 123 – "Curving Bullet" ==
- Original air date: June 10, 2009

=== Sonic Boom Sound-off ===
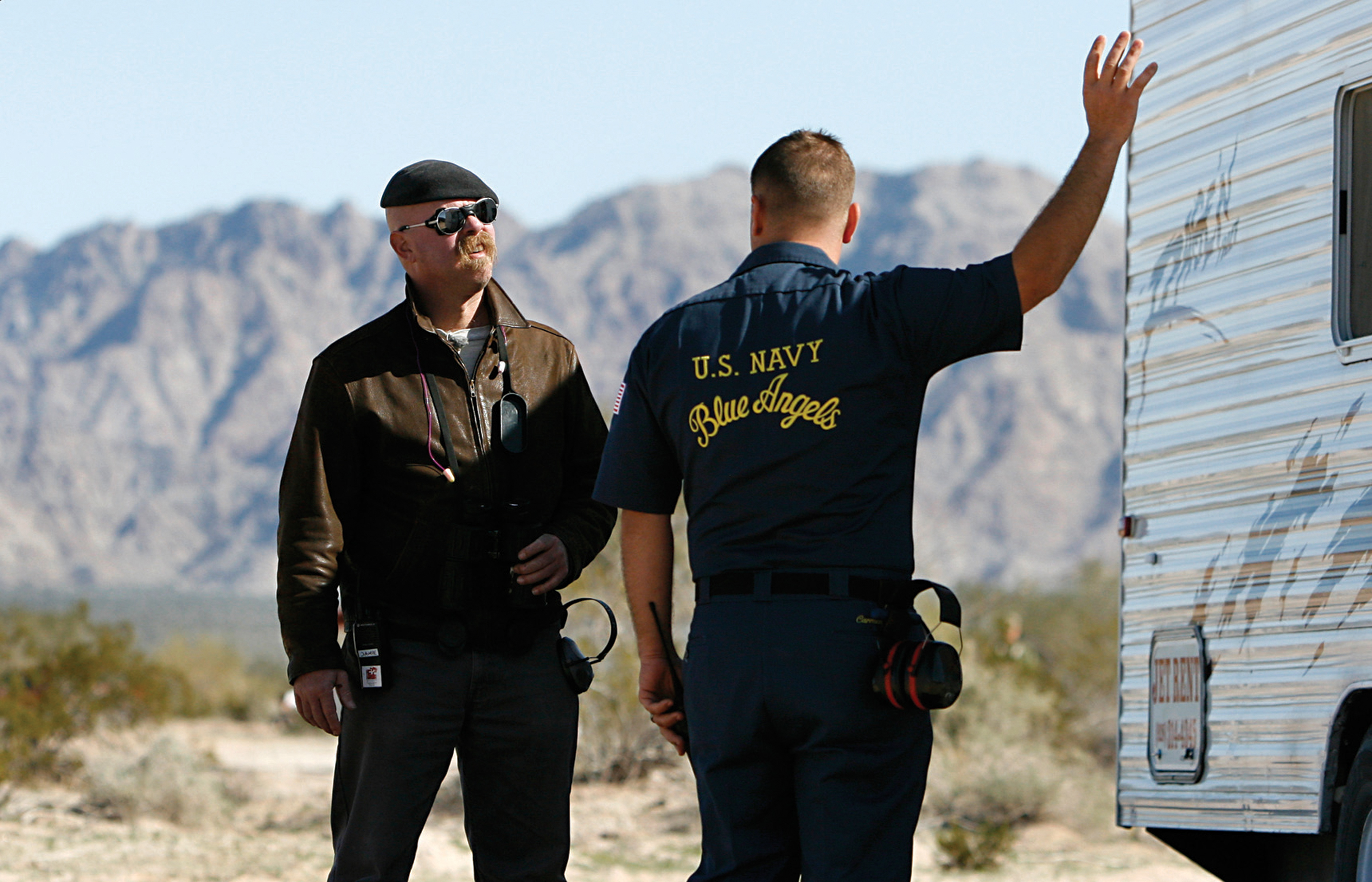
Jamie and a Blue Angels team member prepare for a flyby at Marine Corps Air Station Yuma.

To help test this myth, the MythBusters enlisted the aid of the Blue Angels and their F/A-18 Hornets.

Myth statement	Status	Notes
A supersonic bullet can (and will) break any kind of glass just by the sonic boom it generates.	Busted	The MythBusters got their hands on an Armalite AR-50 .50 caliber sniper rifle, one of the most powerful rifles available. They then lined up two rows of glass objects, such as windows, wine glasses, cups, and lightbulbs, and fired the rifle so that the bullet would pass between both rows. However, the bullet's sonic boom failed to break any of the glass, no matter how close it passed by.
A supersonic jet will break any kind of glass by the sonic boom it generates.	Busted	Jamie set up a test area filled with various glass items and products while Adam performed a flyby in an F/A-18 going supersonic. However, at flybys of 8,000, 2,000, and 500 feet (2,400, 610, and 150 m), the jet failed to break any of the glass. They then performed a series of low-altitude flybys at 200 feet (61 m), but they managed to break only a single window. Since the majority of the glass was still intact, the MythBusters declared the myth busted.

=== Bend a Bullet ===
This myth was inspired by scenes from the film version of Wanted.

Myth statement	Status	Notes
It is possible to curve a bullet around an obstacle by quickly flicking the gun upon firing.	Busted	The Build Team first tested the myth by imitating the actions seen in the movie by swinging their arms and flicking their wrists as they fired. However, they failed to hit their target and the high-speed footage revealed that the bullets were still flying straight. In order to simulate the superhuman speed and precision that the characters in the movie possessed, the Build Team used a robotic arm. However, neither human nor superhuman speeds could curve the bullet. The Build Team then tried firing bullets that had their balance and aerodynamics purposely altered from a smoothbore barrel. While the bullets were highly unstable, they still travelled in a straight path due to their massive forward momentum. The Build Team declared the myth busted since the myth defied the laws of physics. Once the bullet leaves the gun, there are no lateral forces applied to the bullet, so by Newton's laws, the bullet will follow a straight path.

== Episode 124 – "Car vs. Rain" ==
- Original air date: June 17, 2009

=== Driving in the Rain in a Convertible ===
Myth statement	Status	Notes
Driving a convertible with the top down in the rain at a high speed will ensure that no water can enter the driver compartment.	Plausible (but not recommended)	The MythBusters first performed several small-scale tests, using a model car and a wind tunnel, and found that at higher speeds, a sort of air bubble seemed to form around the driver compartment, giving credence to the myth. In their full-scale test, they used an actual convertible as well as a rain bar to provide the rain. In the control test, they stopped the convertible in the middle of the rain to put up the top, but the interior was still soaked. They then drove through the rain at 70 mph (110 km/h) and saw that the interior was significantly less soaked than in the control. They then drove the car through the rain at 90 mph (140 km/h) and saw that the interior was not soaked at all. The MythBusters attributed this to the car's windshield, which served its function as well as creating an air bubble. However, they decided to declare the myth "plausible but not recommended" due to the inherent danger of driving at such high speeds on wet roads.

=== Popcorn Pandemonium ===
The Build Team tested various myths involving popcorn.

Myth statement	Status	Notes
Popcorn can be made by detonating a propane tank with high explosive.	Busted	The explosion failed to cook or pop any of the popcorn kernels since the blast blew the kernels away before they could absorb any heat.
Popcorn can be made by igniting sawdust and dairy creamer.	Busted	The Build Team loaded popcorn kernels into a can filled with flammable dairy creamer and ignited it, but the team failed to pop any of the kernels. Like the explosives, the ignited creamer did not meet the specific requirements needed to cook popcorn.
A plane-mounted 5-megawatt laser can be used to cook popcorn, and enough popcorn can expand to the point where it can break open a house. This myth was based on the final scene from the film Real Genius.	Busted	Since a 5-megawatt laser does not currently exist, the Build Team used a 10-watt laser and still successfully popped a kernel. Even though this proved lasers could pop popcorn, there currently is not a laser powerful enough to cook such a large amount, so the Build Team resorted to using a large pan to cook popcorn through induction. They then placed a panel representing the wall and window of a house over the pan to see if the popcorn could break through it. However, the popcorn lacked the power to push through the window because it cannot pop when pressure is exerted on it. They then decided to test the expansion potential of popcorn by loading pre-popped popcorn into a small model house. They then used a piston to exert pressure on the floor of the house at 0.22 pounds per square inch (1.5 kPa), but nothing happened. They then used the piston at maximum power to destroy the house. To end on a bang, the Build Team used high explosive to destroy a house filled with popcorn.

== Episode 125 – "Knock Your Socks Off" ==
- Original air date: October 7, 2009

=== Bullet Fired vs. Bullet Dropped ===
Myth statement	Status	Notes
A bullet fired horizontally and one dropped from the same height will hit the ground simultaneously.	Confirmed	Adam and Jamie first carried out two small-scale experiments: one using ball bearings (dropped vs. shot from a spring-loaded launcher), and the other using paintballs (dropped vs. fired from a paintball gun). While the first experiment seemed to bear out the myth, the second one contradicted it; Adam attributed this result to imperfections in the paintballs' surfaces that caused them to veer slightly off course. For full-scale testing, Adam and Jamie started at a firing range and used a .45 caliber pistol to measure the distance a bullet would travel before hitting the ground. Since the ground there was not level and there was a breeze outside, they set up a second test at Fort Mason. Once they had properly fine-tuned their mechanism to fire and drop the bullets at the same time, they found that the two bullets landed within 39.6 milliseconds of each other. Commenting that this difference was less than the duration of one film frame (shot at 24 frames per second), and thus short enough for the human eye not to notice, they declared the myth confirmed.

=== Knock Your Socks Off ===
Myth statement	Status	Notes
It is possible to literally knock someone's socks off. Pairs of socks sent in by viewers were used for the testing of this myth.	Partly busted	Initially, the original myth to test was going to be what happened to the socks that go missing in a wash cycle in the laundry, hence the call for sock donations. However, the massive number of fan requests sent in along with the socks to test the idiom demanded a last-minute change of plans. The Build Team set up a nitrogen-powered cannon to deliver a powerful uppercut to Buster, stronger than the best heavyweight boxers. Buster's socks stayed on after the hit, though one of them slid down somewhat. In the next test, the Build Team swung a heavy pendulum (roughly 1,700 pounds (770 kg)) down into Buster's chest, first with shoes and socks, then with socks only. The second swing left Buster with one sock almost off his foot, but further scrutiny revealed that it came loose when that foot dragged along the ground after impact. The team then set up an explosion, using 500 pounds (230 kg) of ANFO and mannequin legs in socks at distances between 15 and 55 feet (4.6 and 16.8 m). Rupture discs calibrated to burst at 100 pounds per square inch (690 kPa) were set up at each distance as well, to evaluate the likelihood of a person's survival. The blast stripped socks off at 15 and 25 feet (4.6 and 7.6 m), bursting those discs and the one at 35 feet (11 m); at the longer distances, both the discs and the legs were intact. Since a person who lost his or her socks in this explosion would also be killed, the team declared the myth busted.

== Episode 126 – "Duct Tape Hour" ==
- Original air date: October 14, 2009

The MythBusters tackle various myths relating to the "handyman's secret weapon". They tested whether or not duct tape can...

Myth statement	Status	Notes
...lift a 5,000-pound (2,300 kg) car.	Confirmed	Through small-scale tests, the MythBusters discovered that a single length of duct tape can support up to 70 pounds (32 kg). They then attached the car to a crane with duct tape. The car was lifted successfully, and it was left suspended until the tape failed. The MythBusters were quick to point out that the tape itself failed by breaking, not by its adhesive properties.
...be used instead of standard adhesives when building a potato cannon.	Confirmed	The Build Team constructed two potato cannons, one held together with polymer cement and the other with duct tape. They fired both cannons repeatedly to compare their range and velocity, and they found that they gave essentially identical performance.
...be used to build a fully functional cannon.	Confirmed	The Build Team used 1-inch-thick (25 mm) tiles of duct tape to measure how much strength it could tolerate. Using a small-scale test cannon equipped with a strength gauge, they discovered that the duct tape tile was indeed strong enough to withstand a cannon blast. They then built a duct tape cannon with a 2-inch-thick (51 mm) barrel and compared its performance to that of a conventional steel cannon. Although the range and speed of the duct tape cannon were inferior to the steel one due to friction caused by the deformation of the duct tape barrel, it successfully fired a cannonball and remained intact.
...be used to seal leaks in a boat.	Plausible	The MythBusters patched a damaged boat with duct tape and floated it out into San Francisco Bay. The tape managed to keep the boat afloat, with only minor signs of damage after 40 minutes of exposure. Adam then decided to test whether duct tape can seal an existing leak while the boat is still in the water. He noted that it was more difficult to get the duct tape to stick underwater, but he successfully patched the leak. However, the "emergency" fix was not nearly as effective, and the duct tape quickly failed. The MythBusters concluded that duct tape was a viable temporary repair method when applied in dry conditions.
...be used to construct an entire boat.	Confirmed	The MythBusters built an entire sailboat using 690 square feet (64 m^{2}) of duct tape for the hull and sail. They then took the boat, dubbed the Stuck on You, into San Francisco Bay. The duct tape boat turned out to be fully functional with no sign of failure and, as stated by Adam, "adequately seaworthy", confirming the myth.

== Episode 127 – "Clean Car vs. Dirty Car" ==
- Original air date: October 21, 2009

Adam and Jamie test whether a dirty car gets better gas mileage than an equivalent clean car, while the Build Team tests an old adage concerning beer, liquor, and hangovers.

=== Dirty Car Cash ===
Myth statement	Status	Notes
A dirty car is more fuel efficient than a clean car because the dirt makes the car more aerodynamic like the dimples on a golf ball.	Busted (concept plausible)	Adam and Jamie covered a car in dirt and mud and drove it down a track at highway speeds to measure its fuel efficiency, and they repeated the test after the car was cleaned. They discovered that the average gas mileage for the dirty car was 24 miles per US gallon (10 km/L), while the clean car performed better at 26 miles per US gallon (11 km/L). They then tested the reasoning behind the myth and tested how well dimpled golf balls performed against smooth balls. They discovered that dimpled golf balls could fly almost twice as far as smooth balls. Dimpled balls disrupt the air around them, creating a smaller wake behind them and reducing drag. After testing model cars in a wind tunnel, Adam and Jamie put a layer of clay on a full-size car and did two more sets of runs on their track: one with a smooth clay surface, and the other with dimples pressed into it. The respective fuel efficiencies were calculated as 26 and 29 miles per gallon (11 and 12 km/L). Although the original myth was invalid, the theory behind it was sound, leading to a final judgment of "myth busted, concept plausible."

=== The Morning After ===
Myth statement	Status	Notes
A hangover caused by beer is less severe than one caused by a mixture of beer and liquor.	Busted	To perform this test, Tory and Grant would have to eat the same food, drink their alcohol at the same time, and sleep for the same length of time in the warehouse for consistent results. Kari (who could not take part because of her pregnancy) then devised a battery of tests to measure dehydration, memory, light/sound/motion sensitivity, and coordination, along with headache severeness. Without having drunk alcohol, Tory and Grant performed well on their control test. They then performed the beer test, with Tory drinking 14 cans of beer and Grant drinking 6. They both performed significantly worse than in the control tests, signifying they were badly hung over. After taking a couple days to "dry out", they then repeated the test with a mixture of beer and liquor, making sure to drink the same equivalent amount of alcohol as in the first test. The next morning, Grant improved significantly and did not have a hangover, feeling much better than in the last test. Tory woke up with a splitting headache, but other than that, he actually felt (and tested) better than with the beer alone. The Build Team then concluded that the myth was busted.

== Episode 128 – "Greased Lightning" ==
- Original air date: October 28, 2009

The MythBusters test two potential kitchen disasters, as well as whether cheese can be used with a cannon.

=== Grease Fire Fiasco ===
Myth statement	Status	Notes
If a person tries to put out a stovetop grease fire by pouring 8 US fluid ounces (240 mL) of water on it, a 30-foot (9.1 m) fireball will result.	Busted	Adam and Jamie set up a stove and started fires with three different cooking materials: canola oil, peanut oil, and lard. The ratio of oil to water was 8 to 1 in each case, with 64 US fluid ounces (1,900 mL) of oil and 8 US fluid ounces (240 mL) of water. In each case, a large fireball formed when the water was poured in, due to the sudden formation of steam, which propelled the burning oil upward. No fireball reached higher than 25 feet (7.6 m). To investigate further, Adam and Jamie did some smaller-scale tests, varying the oil/water ratio and the shape of the cooking pot. The latter had no apparent effect on the fireball height, but they decided to use a 2:1 ratio (2 US qt (1,900 mL) of oil, 1 US qt (950 mL) of water) for further full-scale work in a mockup kitchen set. Under these conditions, they were able to get a 30-foot (9.1 m) fireball; however, they declared the myth busted because the original 8:1 ratio did not generate the stated result. In a further test, Adam and Jamie set up a shelf to drop an unopened can of soup into the oil, reasoning that having all the water-based material at the bottom of the pot would more effectively launch the oil when it vaporized and exploded. The result was a fireball with an estimated height of 100 feet (30 m).
It is possible to put out a grease fire with enough water.	Confirmed	Adam called in a firefighting helicopter, which dropped 500 US gallons (1,900 L) of water on the grease fire and successfully extinguished it.

=== Microwave Mayhem ===
Myth statement	Status	Notes
A bomb made from a block of C-4 can be detonated by placing it in a microwave oven and heating it for one minute (based on a scene in the film Grosse Pointe Blank).	Busted	The Build Team set up three microwave ovens, each of which contained a different C-4 device: one unaltered block, one with wiring similar to that used in the film, and one with both wiring and a blasting cap. Using a remote-controlled bomb disposal robot, the team set each oven to run for 60 seconds at full power. The unaltered block did not heat up appreciably, while the one with only the wiring caught fire but did not detonate (though the door of that oven did burst open). The wiring/cap device exploded violently after only a few seconds of heating, due to sparks arcing across the metal wires and touching off the blasting cap. Since a person placing this bomb in a microwave would be unable to get to safety before it exploded, the team declared the myth busted.

=== Cheese Cannon ===
Myth statement	Status	Notes
A block of cheese can be fired from a cannon with enough force to shred a ship's sail (based on accounts of a 19th-century South American naval battle in which the Uruguayan commander was forced to use slabs of Dutch Edam instead of cannonballs when the ammunition ran out).	Confirmed	The Build Team evaluated three different cheeses for hardness, stiffness, and elasticity: Edam, smoked Gouda, and Garrotxa. They set up a canvas sail made with period-accurate materials and methods and fired one sample of each cheese at it. Edam, the softest of the three, bounced off the sail without damaging it. Gouda, the hardest, was too brittle and broke up into fragments as soon as it left the barrel. However, the Garrotxa, having the right mix of hardness and elasticity, remained intact and punched a hole in the canvas. Even though the exact type of cheese did not match the accounts, the team declared the myth confirmed. Kari also said this was "a very delicious myth."

== Episode 129 – "Hurricane Windows" ==
- Original air date: November 4, 2009

Adam and Jamie tested whether windows should be open or closed during a hurricane, while the Build Team took on two myths involving liquid nitrogen.

=== Hurricane Windows ===
Myth statement	Status	Notes
During a hurricane, it is better to have windows open than closed.	Busted	The MythBusters first did a small-scale test using a box with window panels at all sides with pneumatic valves attached to them. In the wind tunnel, it was determined that having all windows open seemed to be the best option, since it would provide the least stress on the structure of the house. For the large-scale test, the MythBusters made use of Medusa, the world's largest portable hurricane simulator, located at University of Florida's Hurricane Research Facility, and beforehand built a house that was small enough to accommodate Medusa's cowling but otherwise built to several state building codes. Unlike in the small-scale test, however, the house withstood the winds Medusa generated, equivalent to a Category 2 hurricane, even when the windows were closed (the windows-open test left a mess inside the house, though). In fact, the pressure exerted on the house while the windows were closed was so minimal, it was negligible. The MythBusters explained that unlike their small-scale box, the surface area of a full-size house's windows are only a fraction of the building's total surface area, negating the effect. When other components of a hurricane, such as rain and flying debris, were added, the house was again left standing, but the windows were broken, resulting in a mess similar to that of the windows-open test. This meant that there would still be damage in the hurricane's aftermath, inside or out, no matter if the windows are closed or open, and it is still best to board up one's windows before a hurricane.

=== Liquid Nitrogen Myths ===
Myth statement	Status	Notes
A human head dipped into liquid nitrogen for five seconds can be shattered into pieces (based on a scene in the film Jason X).	Busted	For this test, Grant built a pan hammer robot to simulate an object being smashed on the counter. Four heads using a mold of Kari's bust were then made: three made of ballistics gel, each with a skull and brain matter analog inside, and one completely made of ice. In the two control tests, the ice head shattered, while the ballistics gel head in room temperature had only its front part broken. The test for the one dipped into liquid nitrogen for five seconds showed a result seemingly in between the two control tests: Parts of the head did shatter but not completely. To achieve the results shown in the film, the third head had to be dipped in the liquid nitrogen for five minutes. To really simulate human flesh and bone, the myth was then retested using two pigs' heads. The head dipped for only five seconds merely had its snout flattened, while the one submerged for fifteen minutes did not even shatter, completely busting the myth. In a related test not aired in the actual episode but shown on the MythBusters website, Kari made an ice sculpture of a pig's head. The pan hammer broke off only the snout of the ice head; the rest of the head was shattered after it fell off the table.
A fresh Christmas tree doused with liquid nitrogen can spontaneously explode.	Busted	For a control test, a Christmas tree explosion was made using a detonation cord. Then, a second Christmas tree was sprayed with liquid nitrogen. However, after half an hour and with the temperature of the tree plummeting to almost −330 °F (−201.1 °C), no explosion occurred, not even after Tory fired it with buck shot. The myth was busted because conifers and other kinds of cold-climate trees have air spaces outside the tree cells large enough to accommodate the expanding water as it turns into ice, thus preventing an expected explosion.

== Episode 130 – "Crash and Burn" ==
- Original US air date: November 11, 2009
- Original UK air date: November 2, 2009

=== Crash and Burn ===
Adam and Jamie tested whether a car would explode when driven off a cliff.

Myth statement	Status	Notes
A car that goes over the side of a cliff will always explode in a fireball, just like in the movies.	Busted	Adam and Jamie took a car out to a quarry and set it up on chocks. However, before Adam could put a weight on the gas pedal, the car started rolling over the edge. It made it past only the first few ledges of the cliff and did not explode. The second car was raised by a forklift so they could get it up to speed, and then they set it on the ground. Despite crashing as it did in the movies, this car did not explode either. Adam and Jamie discovered why: The gas tank is put on the underside of the car and between the wheels, intentionally out of harm's way. The MythBusters dropped a 3,000-pound (1,400 kg) weight directly on the gas tank to simulate the car landing on a rock and flattening the gas tank. The result was the kind of fireball seen in the movies. Adam and Jamie attached the gas tank to the front of a car, drove it over the cliff, and caught the car on fire. It still was not the kind of fireball from the movies, though. The car crept towards the edge because Jamie had left the parking brake on. So, with Frank Doyle's help, Adam and Jamie loaded another car up with explosives, drove it off a ramp and over a cliff, and watched it crash perfectly like in the movies. Frank's method was the one mostly used by filmmakers. Adam then stated that, for once, Hollywood did not exactly bend the laws of physics; it just turned a one-in-a-million shot into a one-in-one shot.

=== Rocket Man ===
The Build Team saw if a rocket could launch a cage containing a human.

Myth statement	Status	Notes
In 1633, an Ottoman Turk named Lagari Hassan launched himself 1,000 feet (300 meters) into the air by using a rocket, flew down to Earth with a wing-like device, and survived.	Busted	Since the myth is a legend retold over the years, definitive records of neither the rocket's design nor the wing device exist. Kari found two illustrations of the story: one showing a multi-engine rocket, and the other showing a single-engine rocket. Tory and Grant each built a small-scale version of one of the rockets. Tory's small-scale multi-engine rocket was relatively stable, while Grant's small-scale single-engine, half-cage design flew erratically and almost crashed into the crew. For the full-scale test, they decided to use Tory's rocket shape but with only one engine for safety reasons. The next part to test was the wing-device. After doing some hang-gliding (Kari stayed on the ground, being pregnant), Grant and Tory realized that a safe wing design would be too huge to store and deploy at the right time. They decided on using a parachute, since definitive records of the wing-device do not exist. Kari built a spring-loaded mechanism to fire the parachute at the right time, and she attached it to the simulaid. The team set the rocket off at an actual missile launch site, but the results were not good. The rocket shot up to around 100 feet (30 m), then tumbled around in the air and caught on fire, burning the simulaid, dubbed "Rocket Man," to a crisp. Like the Ming Dynasty Astronaut myth before, this ancient rocket legend was busted.

== Episode 131 – "Myth Evolution" ==
- Original air date: November 18, 2009

The MythBusters test new tangents from five previous myths.

=== Exploding Water Heater ===
Myth statement	Status	Notes
An exploding water heater can shoot up about 500 feet (150 m) in the air at around 300 miles per hour (480 km/h).	Confirmed	The MythBusters did this test after some viewers doubted their estimates in the original water heater rocket myth. They set up a full-sized 52 US gal (200 L) water heater, removed all safety mechanisms, and covered it with blankets to speed up heating. After the eventual explosion, Adam used the high-speed camera footage to help him in his calculations, which revealed that the unobstructed water heater shot up 560 feet (170 m) at an initial speed of 350 miles per hour (560 km/h), which was near their estimates in their original test.
A water heater can explode like a rocket and shoot through the roof of a two-story house.	Plausible	The MythBusters set up a three-tier scaffold to simulate a two-story house. The lowest level housed the 52-US gallon water heater, the second level was a set simulating a living room, and on top was a roof built to standard California building codes. The resulting explosion from the water heater did cause it to shoot through the living room floor and the roof, landing on the metal scaffold next to the house model. The myth was deemed plausible because, unlike with the original myth, the show did not mention any documented events of water heater explosions in two-story houses.

=== Corner Shot ===
The Build Team tested various Hollywood methods for shooting around corners, beginning with an offshoot of the Bend a Bullet myth from episode 123.

Myth statement	Status	Notes
A device that shoots bullets around right angles exists (based on the film Wanted).	Confirmed	The device—aptly named the "CornerShot"—does exist, though it is considerably larger than its film counterpart. While standing outside the doorway to a room, Kari successfully used the device to shoot a target inside.

Grant and Tory also tested other techniques of shooting around a corner in Hollywood movies. Starting from Kari's position at the doorway, they tried to hit the target in the room by...

Myth statement	Status	Notes
...firing with only the gun exposed to the target while still hidden.	Busted	Because Grant could not see the target, all of his shots missed.
...jumping out of the corner and shooting at the target.	Plausible	Tory hit the target by using this technique and landed on a mattress that had been placed to break his fall. However, chances of doing this in a real-world setting (i.e., no mattress on which to land and the target shooting back) are slim.

According to Tory, this "complete set" appears to have set a first on MythBusters, where three myths were tested simultaneously with one confirmed, one plausible, and the remaining one busted.

=== Car Cling (Cardboard Box Wall Crash) ===
Taking off from the original Car Cling myth, Adam and Jamie tested whether or not someone could...

Myth statement	Status	Notes
...hold on to the roof of a car with the windows up while the car crashes through a wall of cardboard boxes.	Confirmed	Jamie stayed on the top of the car, even though he let go seconds before the car crashed through the wall. Some boxes were hit by the front end of the rig, and only one box directly hit him.
...hold on to the hood of a car while the car crashes through a wall of cardboard boxes.	Confirmed	Adam stayed on the car despite feeling what he described was a force acting on his feet from the boxes. Upon closer inspection of the high-speed footage, Adam actually let go of his grip on the hood and slid up the windshield. He then regained his grip on the hood just as he was about to fall off the car. Since the loss of his grip happened so fast for anyone to notice (around one second), this myth was deemed confirmed.

The MythBusters pointed out that the tests were done with empty cardboard boxes, as they seemingly are in many Hollywood movies. A different result may suffice if they contained any shipment, especially heavy ones such as electronics or "anvils."

=== Liquid Lock Pick ===
Fans requested having this myth tested after the original Liquid Nitrogen myths were shown in the episode "Hurricane Windows".

Myth statement	Status	Notes
A padlock soaked in liquid nitrogen is easier to break.	Confirmed	It took Tory four seconds using a hammer and crowbar to break a padlock at room temperature. After a second lock was sprayed with liquid nitrogen for five minutes, he was able to break it in one hit. The Build Team then tested a door locked with a deadbolt; Tory required over five minutes to smash it at room temperature but less than two minutes after it had been frozen. Grant pointed out that the method would require so many people, and so much time and specialized equipment, that it would not be a practical or stealthy way of breaking into a building. Nevertheless, the team declared the myth confirmed. In a test shown only on the MythBusters website (and aired in versions of the episode shown outside the US instead of the deadbolt test), a second padlock test was done using a large heavy-duty padlock. There, Tory was unsuccessful in breaking the room-temperature lock after four minutes; he broke only part of the bunker's lock hasp. When a second lock was dipped into liquid nitrogen, it took Tory only five hits and 14 seconds to smash it.

=== Snowplow Rocket Replication ===
The original Snowplow Split tests shown in the second Alaska Special focused only on the circumstances of the myth. This new, supersized test presented below looked onto the results.

Myth statement	Status	Notes
A V-shaped snowplow is capable of perfectly bifurcating a car front-to-rear in a head-on collision, while the driver and the passenger both escape unharmed.	Busted	A wedge entirely made of steel was made and then installed onto a rocket sled to represent the snowplow. The surrogate snowplow traveled a total distance of 770 feet (230 m) and struck the car at a speed of 550 miles per hour (890 km/h), completely splitting it along its length with a thrust of 75,000 pounds-force (330 kN). Afterwards, the wedge disintegrated when the rocket sled slammed into a concrete barrier behind the car. The Build Team still regarded the myth as busted because an average motorist is highly unlikely to encounter a snowplow traveling with enough speed to destroy a car in this manner.

== Episode 132 – "Dumpster Diving" ==
- Original air date: November 25, 2009

Adam and Jamie test a Hollywood chase scene jump, while the Build Team probes a gruesome diving disaster. Kari departs to begin her maternity leave, and Jessi Combs joins the Build Team in her absence.

=== Dumpster Diving ===
Myth statement	Status	Notes
A person who jumps from the roof of a building into a full dumpster can survive and run away (based on the occurrence of this event during chase scenes in several movies).	Plausible (but not recommended)	Adam and Jamie first took some lessons in safe stunt falls, jumping onto an airbag from heights of 13 and 20 feet (4 and 6 m) without injury. They then inspected a few typical dumpsters but found materials inside that would endanger a person falling into them, such as hospital waste, wood, and metal rebar. Adam jumped from the top of a ladder onto four "ideal" materials—empty cardboard boxes, shredded paper, Styrofoam packing peanuts, and foam rubber blocks—to evaluate their ability to cushion a fall. The foam rubber performed the best in this respect and was chosen for full-scale testing. With accelerometers on his body to measure his speed changes, Buster was dropped from 20 feet (6 m) into the airbag and a dumpster full of foam rubber. The two trials yielded g-forces of 11.4 g and 9.9 g, respectively, indicating that a leap into the dumpster would be survivable and perhaps even more comfortable than jumping into the airbag because of the lower g-force involved. Adam then attempted the dumpster jump from the same height; upon landing, he was able to climb out and run away. He and Jamie classified the myth as plausible but not recommended, since a person making the jump would have no way of knowing ahead of time whether the dumpster contents would safely break the fall.

=== The Squeeze ===
Myth statement	Status	Notes
A deep-sea diver in an old-style suit can be crushed into his or her helmet if the line connecting him to his or her surface air compressor breaks.	Confirmed	The Build Team learned that this kind of suit was typically fitted with a non-return valve that prevented a loss of suit pressure if the line broke. They chose to proceed on the premise that the diver might have forgotten to keep the valve in good condition, and put together a small-scale ballistic gelatin model of a human diver, complete with suit and helmet. Placing it at the bottom of a 15-foot (4.6 m) dive tank and cutting the air supply, they were visibly surprised to see gelatin being squeezed up into the helmet as the pressure crushed the suit. At this point, Kari withdrew from further work to go on maternity leave and was replaced by Jessi Combs. The team made a full-size human analog from pork and a model skeleton (dubbed Meat Man by Tory, who made him), filled its chest with simulated internal organs, dressed it in a suit and Mark V dive helmet, and lowered it to a depth of 300 feet (90 m) in the ocean. After the suit was properly pressurized to 135 pounds per square inch (930 kPa) to match the water depth, they cut the air supply. The pressure change caved in portions of the helmet and caused it to fill with flesh, blood, and organs from the body being crushed upward. Based on this result, the team declared the myth confirmed.

== Episode 133 – "Antacid Jail Break" ==
- Original air date: December 2, 2009

Adam and Jamie put a story of a prisoner's escape to the test, while the Build Team investigates a supposedly foolproof method for smugglers to avoid detection.

=== Antacid Jail Break ===
Myth statement	Status	Notes
By mixing enough antacid tablets with water, a prisoner can generate enough carbon dioxide to blow his or her cell apart.	Busted	Adam and Jamie first ran some bench-scale tests to correlate the volume and pressure of the liberated gas with the number of tablets used and the size of the container. Meanwhile, the crew built a prison cell in a naval shipyard warehouse, complete with plumbing fixtures and a door made of 1.25-inch (32 mm)-thick, bullet-resistant plastic. For a small-scale test, Adam and Jamie put together a glass box, lined it with airtight plastic sheeting, and mixed 100 tablets with water inside; the resulting gas pressure blew out its sides. Adam and Jamie decided to use 22,000 tablets (roughly 10 years' worth, based on two tablets provided with every meal) in their first full-scale test. After lining the cell with plastic, they mixed the tablets with 350 US gallons (1,300 L) of water but did not see any rise in pressure. Realizing that the gas was probably leaking out around the plumbing pipes, they removed the fixtures and brought in the equivalent of 100,000 tablets' worth of solid and powdered antacid. When the water was added, the resulting pressure—a peak of 4 pounds per square inch (28 kPa)—bent the door outward severely until the plastic lining burst at its lower edge. In the end, Adam and Jamie agreed that while the method could perhaps be used to break open a prison cell, there was a fatal flaw; if the prisoner were inside the plastic, he or she would rapidly be overcome and suffocated by the amount of carbon dioxide released from the tablets, and if he or she were outside the plastic, the resulting pressure from the bag pressing on his or her body would cause compressive asphyxia and/or fatal internal injuries. Based on this, and the unfeasibly large number of tablets required, Adam and Jamie deemed the myth busted.

=== Driving in the Dark ===
Myth statement	Status	Notes
A person can drive safely at or above highway speeds in near-total darkness without using headlights.	Busted	This myth was inspired by stories of smugglers beating checkpoints at the Canada–US border by making late-night runs, turning off their headlights, and driving fast to go incognito. To test this, Grant, Tory, and Jessi set up a course at an indoor go kart track, complete with obstacles to test reaction time, long-range vision, and sign-reading ability. Each member drove the course in the dark, with headlights on, and was evaluated for lap time and driving skill. Next, each one sat for 20 minutes in a totally darkened room to let his/her eyes adjust before making a second run with the headlights off. Grant and Jessi both performed badly on the obstacles during this run; Tory was the only one able to complete the course, and he did so only by driving much more slowly than in his first lap. Jessi then suggested that the team add the hazard of an oncoming car's headlights, and to simulate them, Grant fastened halogen lamps to his old champion BattleBot Deadblow (nicknamed "Blinky" because of the headlights) and positioned it behind a turn before the next run. When Tory tried to drive the course, the glare from Deadblow's lights caused him to crash almost immediately. Finally, he put on a set of night vision goggles and attempted one more run, with Jessi chasing him on a go kart outfitted with a siren and flashing lights to simulate a police car. He performed badly, complaining of a lack of depth perception and a narrow field of view, and was soon caught by Jessi. Since no one was able to negotiate the course well without lights, the team declared the myth busted.

== Episode 134 – "Unarmed and Unharmed" ==
- Original air date: December 9, 2009

Adam and Jamie test the Hollywood cowboy's ability to shoot a gun out of a villain's hand, while the Build Team tries to re-create a big-budget bus jump.

=== Unarmed & Unharmed ===
Myth statement	Status	Notes
It is possible to shoot a pistol out of a person's hand without injuring him or her.	Busted	Adam and Jamie made several plywood cutouts and equipped their hands to hold a revolver with the same amount of force that a typical person would use. They placed the guns in three different positions—drawing from the hip, pointed ahead for a shootout, and aimed sideways at a hostage—and fired at each. Only the "hostage" position allowed them to both shoot the gun away and keep from injuring its holder due to bullet shrapnel. Adam and Jamie then devised separate methods for determining whether a person would be startled enough to drop his or her gun if it were hit. Adam built a paddle with a gun butt and allowed Jamie to hit it with a baseball bat, delivering roughly the same kinetic energy as a bullet; he dropped it on impact, but Jamie was not satisfied with the result. He attached a short side barrel to a revolver, intending to fire a bullet out of it so that the recoil would match the kick of a bullet in flight hitting the gun. This rig did not work properly, so he removed the side barrel and attached a second grip upside down on top of the revolver frame, mounted on a swivel. Each man held the gun in all three positions ("draw," "shootout," and "hostage") while the other triggered it remotely at a random time. Jamie dropped it in "draw" and "hostage" but not in "shootout," while Adam held on to it in every situation. Owing to the difficulty of hitting the small target of the revolver, the high risk of shrapnel injuries, and the unpredictable reactions of the person holding the weapon, Adam and Jamie classified the myth as busted.

=== Speed Bus Jump ===
Myth statement	Status	Notes
A bus can jump over a 50-foot (15 m) gap in a roadway, land safely on the other side, and drive away (based on a scene in the movie Speed).	Busted	The Build Team acquired a bus with the same dimensions as that used in the film, then built a small-scale model of both it and the stretch of road in question. Running at a calculated speed of 20 miles per hour (32 km/h), the bus plunged off the end of the road and crashed into the support posts at ground level on the other side. When the gap was halved, the bus still dropped far enough to hit the far end of the roadbed head-on. The team theorized that hidden ramps placed on either end of the gap may have helped the bus to make its jump safely. After outfitting their full-size bus for remote-control steering on an airfield, they did a speed test and found that it could go up to 58 miles per hour (93 km/h), rather than the 70 miles per hour (110 km/h) depicted in the film. With the 50-foot target distance scaled down to allow for the lower top speed, they jumped the bus off a ramp; it fell far short of the target, but it remained relatively intact until it hit a concrete safety barricade. Since the bus could not make the jump, the team declared the myth busted.

== Episode 135 – "Hidden Nasties" ==
- Original air date: December 16, 2009

Adam and Jamie tackle two health-hazard myths, while the Build Team tries to skip a car like a stone.

=== Rat Pee Soda ===
Myth statement	Status	Notes
Drinking from a can of soda on which a rat has urinated can be fatal, due to pathogens contained in the urine.	Busted	Adam and Jamie began with a control sample of 1,000 cans, cleaning their tops and turning a pack of rats loose for 90 minutes to urinate on them. Adam and Jamie discovered that the urine would fluoresce under black light, then collected 1,000 cans from various locations and storage areas around San Francisco. To their surprise, a large number of these cans showed apparent contamination under the light; they took swabs from the tops and sent them to Stanford University for chemical analysis, which revealed only harmless dust. Since no rat urine was on the cans, and since any pathogens ingested with the soda would almost certainly be rendered harmless in the digestive tract, Adam and Jamie classified the myth as busted.

=== Car Skip ===
Myth statement	Status	Notes
It is possible to skip a car across the surface of a pond like a stone by driving it off a ramp at 50 miles per hour (80 km/h) (based on a scene in the film Cannonball Run III).	Busted	The Build Team acquired a car with the same surface area, weight, and weight distribution as the Lamborghini that performed the stunt in the film. Jessi determined that the Lamborghini went off the ramp at roughly 50 miles per hour (80 km/h) and traveled 100 feet (30 m) to the other side of the pond. After setting up an artificial pond and the needed ramp, Grant remotely steered the car into the jump. It went nose-down, hit the water, completed a full end-over-end flip, and landed—badly damaged—in the water at the far end. The team conjectured that the car in the film may have been weighted at its rear end in order to make it behave as it did. They performed some small-scale tests to determine the best speed and whether or not the ramp was needed, then set up a second car for another jump. This time, they ran at 100 miles per hour (160 km/h), with the ramp removed and a nitrous oxide tank added to the car, and were able to skip the car all the way to the other end of the pond and drive it away. Since the scene had proven impossible as shown in the film (with the original speed and the ramp), the team declared the myth busted.

=== Hidden Nasties ===
Myth statement	Status	Notes
Some common household items are dirtier than a toilet seat, in terms of number and/or type of germs they carry.	Confirmed	Adam and Jamie selected several items that might carry large numbers of germs, including a toilet seat for comparison. They swabbed a small area of each item, dipped the swabs in liquid growth medium, and transferred the mixtures to agar plates. After the samples were incubated overnight, they were analyzed to determine the number of germ colonies. Results were as follows: Toilet seat – 2; Cell phone – 6; Shopping cart handle – 10; Hotel room TV remote – 44; Computer keyboard – 65; Light switch – 332; Paper money – 936; Kitchen sponge – too many to count; In descending order, the sponge, money, light switch, and keyboard were found to have the highest numbers of dangerous germs. Adam and Jamie recruited a college class to take swabs from 10 of each item, again including 10 toilet seats for comparison, and incubated them as before. This time, the ranking (in descending order of average germ count) was sponge, money, keyboard, toilet seat, and light switch. Because some items did have more germs than the toilet seats, the myth was labeled as confirmed.

== Episode 136 – "Mini-Myth Mayhem" ==
- Original air date: December 28, 2009

The MythBusters examine six small bizarre tales. A notice appears after the end credits, honoring rocketry expert Erik Gates, who contributed materials and expertise for several segments. He died in a construction accident on December 20, 2009.

Myth statement	Status	Notes
A whole coconut can be sent by mail without any packaging.	Confirmed	Adam and Jamie addressed a coconut to themselves, stamped it, and put it in the mail. It later came back to the M5 workshop with no visible damage.
A strike-anywhere match can be lit if grazed by a bullet fired from a gun.	Confirmed	Adam and Jamie set up a .45 caliber pistol and aimed it at a match head. After several shots that either missed the match or destroyed the head entirely, they were able to get a bullet to graze the head and ignite it. They commented on the high degree of accuracy needed to make this shot.

=== Ear Wax Candle ===
Myth statement	Status	Notes
It is possible to make a usable candle out of earwax (based on a scene in the film Shrek).	Busted	The Build Team collected wax from Tory's ears and ignited it alongside paraffin and beeswax, two common materials used for candles. The earwax burned with some sparking and sputtering, whereupon the entire MythBusters crew, their families, and other volunteers were called in to provide more wax. When the team made this into a candle and lit it alongside one made from paraffin, the earwax burned very poorly and inconsistently and soon went out. They attributed this result due to the fact that the material did not melt down smoothly as did the paraffin, which could then easily travel up the wick to burn in the flame.

=== Camp Prank ===
Myth statement	Status	Notes
Dipping a sleeping person's hand in a bowl of warm water will cause him or her to wet the bed.	Busted	At the California Center for Sleep Disorders, Adam and Jamie set up a bed with a moisture-sensitive alarm. Each took a turn as a test subject, with the other ready to place the sleeper's hand in the water once he had achieved a deep-enough sleep. Jamie never reached that point, while Adam kept waking up due to his sleep apnea and ended up with his hands in an awkward position. Jamie was only able to pour the water over Adam's hands, which soon woke him up without triggering the alarm. Crew member Matt Cordova was brought in for a third trial; five minutes after his hand was placed in the water, the alarm went off, but this was due to water spilling out of the bowl.

=== Gorn Cannon ===
Myth statement	Status	Notes
It is possible to create impromptu gunpowder and use it to effectively fire a cannon made from a bamboo stalk (based on the Star Trek episode "Arena" involving a Gorn).	Busted	Grant and Tory collected the ingredients for gunpowder and began to mix them by hand in various ratios, testing them against industrial powder to find the best formulation. Meanwhile, Jessi bored out a thick bamboo stalk to use as a cannon barrel, which the Build Team wrapped with ropes to duplicate the episode more closely. They set up the cannon, with a Gorn target in front and "Captain Kirk" (Buster dressed in a red shirt, because, as Grant commented, any Star Trek crew member that goes down to a planet while wearing a red shirt is not coming back) at the breech, and loaded it with ammunition and homemade powder. When they set the cannon off, the powder only burned without exploding; they achieved the same result with an actual cannon and the homemade powder. When the Build Team loaded the bamboo cannon with industrial powder and set it off, the resulting explosion destroyed the barrel and wrecked "Kirk", but the Gorn was undamaged. Finally, they made a second cannon, reinforced its breech with plywood, and fired it with the same charge, injuring "Kirk" far worse than the Gorn and leading the team to declare the myth busted.

=== Lead Plunge ===
Myth statement	Status	Notes
A person can wet his or her hand and briefly dip it into molten lead without injury.	Confirmed	Adam and Jamie did some research on the Leidenfrost effect, in which cool water vaporizing on a very hot surface generates a layer of vapor that temporarily insulates against high temperature. They melted some lead in a crucible and heated it to 700 °F (370 °C), then dipped a raw, wetted sausage; it emerged partially cooked and with some particles of lead adhering to it. After Adam and Jamie raised the temperature to 850 °F (450 °C), the sausage could be dipped and removed intact, since the lead was now hot enough not to solidify on contact. Finally, Adam and Jamie dipped their own fingers into the liquid—a pinky and an index for Jamie, four fingers at once for Adam—and brought them out unscathed.
