= Melanie Smith (actress) =

American actress (b. 1962)

- Born: December 16, 1962 (age 63); Scranton, PA
- Occupations: Former actress; Yoga instructor; Life coach
- Years active: 1987–2009 (as actress); 2010–present (as yoga instructor / coach)
- Known for: As the World Turns; Star Trek: Deep Space Nine
- Spouse(s): Michael Eidel (m. 1996; div. 20??)
- Children: 1
- Website: workwithmelaniesmith.com

Melanie Smith (born December 16, 1962) is an American former actress. She appeared as Jerry Seinfeld's girlfriend, Rachel, in three episodes of Seinfeld. She was also the third actress to portray Tora Ziyal on Star Trek: Deep Space Nine and had a starring role as Emily Stewart on As the World Turns from 1987 to 1992. Since retiring from acting in 2009, she has become a life coach and runs a yoga studio in New Hope, Pennsylvania. She is the author of Unfinished Business: 8 Steps to Heal Your Trauma, Transcend Your Past, and Transform Your Life, and is the vocalist and a cowriter on her passion project jazz album, The Broken and the Breaker.

== Filmography ==
=== Film ===
Year	Title	Role	Notes
1992	Trancers III	R.J.	Direct-to-video
1993	The Baby Doll Murders	Peggy Davis	
1994	Molly & Gina	Dixie	
1995	The Killers Within	Cynthia Alpert	
1996	Night Hunter	Raimy Baker	
2001	Bodily Sanctions	Cathy Jones	
2003	End Game	Andrea Raitano	

=== Television ===
Year	Title	Role	Notes
1987–1992	As the World Turns	Emily Stewart	183 episodes
1991	Wife, Mother, Murderer	Courtroom Sketch Artist	Television film
1992	Silk Stalkings	Jackie Ruis	Episode: "In Too Deep"
1992	Beverly Hills, 90210	Alyssa Garner	Episode: "The Kindness of Strangers"
1993	Raven	Janis	Episode: "The Guardians of the Night"
1993–1994	Melrose Place	Celia Morales	5 episodes
1994	The Adventures of Brisco County, Jr.	Karina	Episode: "Bye Bly"
1994	Seinfeld	Rachel Goldstein	Episodes: "The Raincoats"; "The Hamptons"; "The Opposite"
1994	Green Dolphin Beat	Linda Rodriguez	Television film
1994	Blossom	Alex	Episode: "Dirty Rotten Scoundrel"
1994	Matlock	Sharon Perleen	Episode: "Dead Air"
1995	Deadly Games	Randi Tanenbaum	Episode: "The Practical Joker"
1995	Murder, She Wrote	Diana Barrow / Nina Larson	2 episodes
1996	Nowhere Man	Young Pauline	Episode: "Forever Jung"
1997	Star Trek: Deep Space Nine	Ziyal	6 episodes
2000	Curb Your Enthusiasm	Lucy Montone	Episode: "The Group"
2001	It's Like, You Know...	Maggie	Episode: "Raw Deal"
2002–2003	The Division	Ronnie Inwood	4 episodes
2005	Seinfeld: Inside Look	Rachel	2 episodes
2009	Gotham the Series	Claire Ryan	Pilot episode, did not go to series

== Book ==
- Smith, Melanie (2023). Unfinished Business: 8 Steps to Heal Your Trauma, Transcend Your Past, and Transform Your Life. New York, NY: Simon & Schuster. p. 288. ISBN 1647425166.
