= The Hamptons (Seinfeld) =

- Seinfeld episode
- Episode no.: Season 5 Episode 21
- Directed by: Tom Cherones
- Written by: Peter Mehlman & Carol Leifer
- Production code: 521
- Original air date: May 12, 1994

Guest appearances
- Melanie Smith as Rachel; Lisa Mende as Carol; Melora Walters as Jane; Richard Burgi as Ben; Mark L. Taylor as Michael; Jesse D. Goins as Cop

Episode chronology
← Previous "The Fire"	Next → "The Opposite"
- Seinfeld season 5

"The Hamptons" is the 85th episode of the NBC sitcom Seinfeld, the 21st episode of the fifth season. It aired on May 12, 1994. In the episode, over a weekend at a beach house in the Hamptons, everyone else sees George's girlfriend topless before he can; Jerry's girlfriend sees George's penile "shrinkage" after a swim; Elaine receives the same compliment as the hosts' ugly baby; and Kramer treats everyone to stolen lobster.

== Plot ==
Carol and Michael have invited everyone to their beach house in East Hampton, New York, for the weekend to see their new baby (as they had in "The Boyfriend"). Jerry brings his girlfriend Rachel, having made peace with her devout Jewish father with a gift of kishka. George brings his girlfriend Jane, assuming that they will have sex for the first time.

Preoccupied with buying local tomatoes for his mother, George is absent when Jane casually goes topless in front of Jerry, Kramer, and Elaine. Jealous that Jerry got to see Jane topless before himself, George seeks to see Rachel naked in return. He fruitlessly tries to catch Rachel changing; later, she walks in on him changing after swimming in the pool, and apparently laughs at his shrunken penis from the cold water. George and Jerry ask Elaine if "women know about shrinkage", which she does not. George is desperate to explain "shrinkage" to Rachel, but Rachel, paying him no heed, gossips to Jane.

Kramer stumbles onto a commercial lobster trap at the beach, and steals the lobsters to cook for dinner. Since shellfish is not kosher, Rachel cannot have any, although she is tempted. Michael is outraged by Kramer's theft, since his father caught lobsters to put him through school.

The guests are revolted by Carol and Michael's "ugly" baby, but the family pediatrician, Ben, praises Elaine and the baby alike as "breathtaking". When Elaine asks Ben, to whom she is attracted, about this, he confides that he was just being polite, but does not clarify whether this referred to her or to the baby's parents.

In the middle of the night, Jane goes home by herself, while Kramer stops Rachel from trying to sneak a taste of lobster, to her gratitude. George gets his revenge on Rachel by serving her scrambled eggs with lobster for breakfast and then successfully walking in on her naked, but gets a tomato in the face from her later. Michael hands Kramer over to police for the lobster theft, and he is sentenced to community service picking up trash on the side of the highway.

== Influence on popular culture ==
The episode has been credited with giving "new meaning to the word 'shrinkage'". Seinfeld writer Peter Mehlman took credit for introducing the word, with Larry David encouraging him to use it in the episode; inversely, Mehlman gave David credit for "sponge-worthy", the catchword from "The Sponge" in the seventh season. The word was later used in a Budweiser commercial, cited as a testament to the show's influence.
