= Allison Schulnik =

American painter, sculptor, and filmmaker (born 1978)

- Born: 1978 (age 47–48); San Diego, California, U.S.
- Education: California Institute of the Arts
- Known for: Painting, sculpture, film, and video animations
- Spouse: Eric Yahnker
- Children: 1
- Website: allisonschulnik.me

Allison Schulnik (born 1978) is an American painter, sculptor, and animated filmmaker. She is known for her heavily textured, impasto oil paintings and her animated short videos.

== Early life and education ==
Schulnik was born in San Diego in 1978. In 2000, she earned a Bachelor of Fine Arts in Experimental Animation from California Institute of the Arts.

== Art practice ==
A multidisciplinary artist, Schulnik is known both for her paintings and her animated video and film works.

As a painter, her signature style is to use thick layers of oil paint to create heavily textured works that are almost sculptural in terms of their depth. These paintings often begin by creating preliminary drawings, followed by the creation of the painting, where she relies on spontaneity and gesture to create texture with her hands. Thematically, her paintings often depict phantom-like creatures and boneless animals that appear to be melting off of the canvas.

Schulnik's animated works begin with the creation of small sculptures of figures and objects made from clay, paint and other materials. She has also used traditional hand-drawn animation techniques in some works.

Her freestanding sculptural works, usually made of ceramic, are often exhibited alongside her paintings and animated works.

Schulnik's collaborations with musicians include the 2009 stop-motion/claymation video Forest for the song Ready, Able by Grizzly Bear. In 2015, Deafheaven selected a painting by Schulnik to use for the cover art of their album New Bermuda.

== Personal life ==
Schulnik is married to fellow artist Eric Yahnker. They live and work in Sky Valley, California and have one daughter.

== Solo exhibitions ==
- 2007: Fools, Rejects, and Sanctuaries, Mark Moore Gallery, Santa Monica, CA
- 2007: No Luck, Rokeby Gallery, London, UK
- 2008: No Luck Too, Mike Weiss Gallery, New York, NY
- 2009: Go West, Mark Moore Gallery, New York, NY
- 2009: Allison Schulnik, Unosunove, Rome, IT
- 2010: Home for Hobo, Mark Moore Gallery, Santa Monica, CA
- 2010: Home for Hobo Too, Tony Wight Gallery, Chicago
- 2011: Performance, Division Gallery, Montreal, QC, Canada
- 2011: Mound, ZieherSmith, New York, NY
- 2012: Mound, Nerman Museum of Contemporary Art, MO
- 2012: Mound, Oklahoma City Art Museum, OK
- 2012: Salty Air, Mark Moore Gallery, Los Angeles, CA
- 2013: EX.POSE: Allison Schulnik, Laguna Art Museum, Laguna, California
- 2014: Eager, ZieherSmith, New York
- 2014: Allison Schulnik/Martix 168, Wadsworth Atheneum Museum of Art, Hartford, Connecticut
- 2016: Hoof, Mark Moore Gallery, Culver City, California
- 2016: Hoof II, ZieherSmith, New York
- 2017: Eager, Flint Institute of the Arts, Flint, Michigan
- 2017: Nest, Galeria Jaier Lopez & Fer Frances, Madrid, Spain
- 2020: Hatch, PPOW, New York

== Filmography and videography ==
- 1997: The Slaying, 16mm stop-motion/live action animated film, 1:00
- 1999: Vedma, 16mm stop-motion animated film, 5:00
- 2000: Pistachio, 16mm stop-motion animated film, 7:00
- 2008: Hobo Clown, stop-motion/claymation video, 5:00
- 2009: Forest, stop-motion/claymation video, 4:30, for the song Ready, Able by Grizzly Bear, from the album Veckatimest
- 2011: Mound, stop-motion/claymation video, 4:33
- 2014: Eager, stop-motion/claymation video, 8:30
- 2019: Moth, hand-painted gouache on paper, animated video, 3:15

== Awards ==
- 2010: South by Southwest Film Festival – Feature Film Audience Award Runner-Up for Forest
- 2014: South by Southwest Film Festival – Special Jury Recognition Award for Eager
- 2014: Ottawa International Animation Festival – Best Abstract/Experimental Animation Film for Eager

== Collections ==
- Albright-Knox Art Gallery
- Chapman University
- Crocker Art Museum
- Farnsworth Art Museum
- Laguna Art Museum
- Los Angeles County Museum of Art
- Montreal Museum of Contemporary Art
- Museum of Fine Arts Houston
- Museé des Beaux Arts de Montréal
- Museum of Contemporary Art San Diego
- Nerman Museum of Contemporary Art
- Santa Barbara Museum of Art
- US Department of State
- Wadsworth Atheneum
