= The Fire (Seinfeld) =

- Seinfeld episode
- Episode no.: Season 5 Episode 20
- Directed by: Tom Cherones
- Written by: Larry Charles
- Production code: 520
- Original air date: May 5, 1994

Guest appearances
- Melanie Chartoff as Robin; Veanne Cox as Toby; Dom Irrera as Ronnie Kaye; Jon Favreau as Eric the Clown; Lisa Pescia as Joanne; Hiram Kasten as Michael; Patience Cleveland as Old Lady; Lawrence LeJohn as Fireman; Jerry Stiller as Frank Costanza (voice, uncredited); Estelle Harris as Estelle Costanza (voice, uncredited)

Episode chronology
← Previous "The Raincoats"	Next → "The Hamptons"
- Seinfeld season 5

"The Fire" is the 84th episode of the NBC sitcom Seinfeld and the 20th episode of the fifth season. It originally aired on May 5, 1994. This was the final episode to be written by Larry Charles. In this episode, Jerry gets revenge on Elaine's coworker Toby for heckling his show, George abandons women, children and the elderly during a fire, and Kramer has a heroic adventure saving Toby's severed pinky toe.

== Plot ==
Kramer's coffee table book about coffee tables is now in prepress at Pendant Publishing. Reviewing the proofs, Elaine's coworker Toby bounces off the walls with relentless enthusiasm that Elaine cannot keep up with. Jerry is anxious to impress a notable magazine critic attending his next show, and Kramer brings Toby, promising she is a "great laugher". Having never attended standup, Toby loudly cheers and boos nonstop, throwing Jerry off-guard. Toby is unapologetic for heckling to "express herself".

George is dating Robin, a comedy club waitress. He attends her young son's birthday party, and is disappointed that the birthday clown does not remember Bozo the Clown. Discovering a small kitchen grease fire, George starts a panic, then shoves the kids, Robin and her elderly mother, and the clown to the ground in a mad dash and escapes alone. The fire is easily put out, and everyone is appalled when George shamelessly defends himself as "leading" the charge to escape.

Jerry gets bad press for Toby's heckling flustering him on stage. At George's suggestion, he gets the "ultimate comedian's revenge" by heckling Toby at work in return. Toby runs out into the street in distress, where a street sweeper runs over her foot and cuts off her pinky toe. Later, Kramer recounts his race against time to deliver the severed toe on ice to the hospital, forcing him to fight off a gunman and drive a runaway bus while making stops all at the same time. George is astounded by Kramer going to such lengths for a toe.

When Toby returns to work with her toe reattached, Elaine gets sidelined entirely as Toby receives the office's outpouring of sympathy, and a promotion to senior editor that Elaine was in the running for. Toby's first order of business is putting Kramer's book on sale.

George, inspired by Kramer, vows to Robin at the comedy club that he will change. A prop comic's water gun robbery gag startles George, who starts another panic and shoves everyone aside. Fellow comedians hail Jerry for standing up to hecklers, but Jerry's hard-won second chance to impress the critic is ruined by the gun scare.

== Production ==
Writer Larry Charles said the episode was sparked by the mental image of George pushing women and children out of his way to escape a fire, and he built the rest of the episode off of this starting image. The Toby/Elaine rivalry was inspired by the office politics at a show next door to Seinfeld; one of the employees had lost a baby, and some of her co-workers were jealous of the attention their boss gave her because of this tragedy.

The voice that announces Jerry's name before he goes on stage is that of show co-creator Larry David. Robin was played by Melanie Chartoff, whom Larry David and Michael Richards knew from the time they worked on the short-lived sketch series Fridays. Jon Favreau made his first television acting appearance in this episode as Eric the Clown.

It was originally planned that Kramer's adventure in the bus would be filmed in action, and the resulting footage intercut with the scene in which he recounts what happened. However, the audience reaction to Kramer's monologue was so positive that the bus scene was deemed unnecessary. The sequence where he finds the toe and ices it inside a Cracker Jack box was filmed, but not used, and appears among the deleted scenes in the DVD release.

== Legacy ==
The Season 5 DVD contains an animated rendition of Kramer's telling of the pinky toe story as part of Seinimation, a series of short animated bonus features on DVDs of the last four seasons, directed by Eric Yahnker.
