= Veanne Cox =

American actress (born 1963)

- Born: January 19, 1963 (age 63); Norfolk, Virginia, U.S.
- Occupations: Actress, ballet dancer
- Years active: 1982–present

External image
- Veanne Cox IMDb photo

Veanne Cox (born January 19, 1963) is an Emmy and Tony-nominated American stage and screen actress and former ballet dancer.

== Early life ==
Cox was born in Norfolk, Virginia. She is a 1981 graduate of Manchester High School in Chesterfield, Virginia. She studied ballet at the Washington School of Ballet, acting at the Studio Theatre (Washington, D.C.) and voice at Catholic University of America.

== Career ==
Her Broadway debut was in the Marvin Hamlisch musical Smile in 1986 as Sandra-Kay Macaffee. She appeared in the Roundabout Theatre revival of Stephen Sondheim's Company in 1995 as "Amy", for which she received a Tony Award nomination for Featured Actress in a Musical. She appeared in The Public Theater (2003) and the Broadway productions of Caroline, or Change (2004) as Rose Stopnick Gellman.

Cox appeared in the made-for-television movie Cinderella (1997) as one of the stepsisters, and appeared in Erin Brockovich as Theresa Dallavale.

She has appeared in episodes of many television series, such as Seinfeld (playing Toby in the episode The Fire), Blue Bloods in 2016, and Odd Mom Out.

She starred in the Guthrie Theatre production of Private Lives as Amanda in 2007.

== Selected stage credits ==
- Summer Stock — Goodspeed Opera House — 2023
- The Music Man — Kennedy Center — 2019
- An American in Paris — Palace Theatre — 2015
- La Cage aux Folles — Broadway revival — 2010
- The Beaux' Stratagem — The Shakespeare Theatre — 2006
- The Wooden Breeks — Lucille Lortel Theatre — 2006
- Caroline, or Change — Eugene O'Neill Theater – 2004
- House/Garden — Manhattan Theatre Club — 2002
- The Dinner Party - Music Box Theatre NYC - 2001
- The Altruists — Vineyard Theatre — 2000
- Company — Roundabout Theatre — 1995

== Filmography ==
=== Film ===
Year	Title	Role	Notes
1982	Bristlelip	Haughty Princess	Short
1989	Miss Firecracker	Tessy Mahoney	
1997	Henry Fool	Laura	
1997	Cinderella	Calliope	TV movie
1998	Dangerous Proposition	Eryn	
1998	You've Got Mail	Miranda Margulies	
2000	Erin Brockovich	Theresa Dallavale	
2000	Big Eden	Mary Margaret Bishop	
2001	Beethoven's 4th	Martha Sedgewick	Video
2002	Two Weeks Notice	Melanie Corman	
2003	Marci X	Caitlin Mellowitz	
2004	Our Italian Husband	Sonya	
2006	The Sasquatch Gang	Lenora	
2006	Out There	Maggie	
2008	Sex and the City	Halloween Woman #1	
2009	The Rebound	Haley	
2014	The Better Angels	Aunt Elizabeth	
2014	The Rewrite	Clara Foss	
2016	Little Boxes	Sarita	
2017	Stay at Home Dad	Marjorie	Video short, completed
2018	Radium Girls	Dr. Katherine Drinker	
2025	A King's Curtain	Kim	Short

=== Television ===
Year	Title	Role	Notes
1984	ABC Afterschool Special	Robin Miller	"Out of Step"
1994	The George Carlin Show	Alice Jean	"George Expresses Himself"
1994	Island City	Helen	TV film
1994	Seinfeld	Toby	"The Fire"
1994	Love & War	Ellen	"A Lonely Nation Turns Its Eyes to You"
1994	The 5 Mrs. Buchanans	Katie	"Nothing on Delilah"
1995	Hope and Gloria	Mary	"Falling in Bed Again"
1995	Pride & Joy	Lisa	"Are You My Mother?"
1997	Cinderella	Calliope	TV film
1998	Caroline in the City	Alice	"Caroline and the Big Night"
1999	The Norm Show	Judy	"My Name Is Norm"
2000	Madigan Men	Sandy Whitlow	"Love's Labor Lost"
2001	One Life to Live	Melissa Miller	TV series
2002	The Education of Max Bickford	Rachel Kane	"Money Changes Everything"
2002	Law & Order: Criminal Intent	Martha Strick	"Maledictus"
2003	Judging Amy	Mrs. Margolis	"Picture of Perfect"
2004	My Sexiest Mistake	Kristen	TV film
2005	Joan of Arcadia	Personable Woman God	"The Rise & Fall of Joan Girardi"
2005	CSI: Crime Scene Investigation	Faith Hollis	"Unbearable"
2006	Numbers	Trish Schane	"Rampage"
2007	Boston Legal	Dr. Kathleen Ryan	"Duck and Cover"
2007	Side Order of Life	Celia Larabee	"Whose Sperm Is It Anyway?"
2009	Law & Order	Ms. Barsett	"Rapture"
2009	Royal Pains	Lois	"No Man Is an Island"
2011	Louie	Ellie Bormer	"Halloween/Ellie"
2011	Pan Am	Miss Havemeyer	"Pilot", "We'll Always Have Paris", "The Genuine Article"
2012	Law & Order: Special Victims Unit	ACS Case Worker	"Child's Welfare"
2013	Smash	Actress	"The Read-Through", "The Fringe", "Musical Chairs"
2014	2 Broke Girls	Amy	"And the Not Broke Parents"
2016	Odd Mom Out	Trixie	"The High Road"
2016	Blue Bloods	Camilla Lawson	"Personal Business"
2017	Incorporated		"Burning Platform", "Golden Parachute"
2019	NCIS: New Orleans	Parker	"X", "Crab Mentality", "The River Styx, Part II"
2019–2023	The Marvelous Mrs. Maisel	Corinne	4 episodes
2020	New Amsterdam	Debra Keating	"In the Graveyard"
2020	Tommy	Jane	"Lifetime Achievement"
2024	Only Murders in the Building	Dr. Maggie	"The Stunt Man"
2026	Widow's Bay	Abigail Stevens	"Our History"
