= Eric Yahnker =

American artist (born 1976)

Eric Yahnker is a contemporary artist born in 1976 in Torrance, California. His humorous, meticulously rendered graphite and colored pencil drawings and elaborate process pieces examine pop culture and politics. His work is represented by Ambach & Rice in Los Angeles, where he was included in an exhibition with Erwin Wurm and Raymond Pettibon in 2010.

He studied journalism at the University of Southern California before earning his BFA at the California Institute of the Arts in 2000. During his second year at CalArts he worked on the storyboard for South Park: Bigger, Longer & Uncut. After he graduated he drew and directed Seinimation, a series of short animated bonus features on DVDs of Seinfeld’s last four seasons.

He is married to artist Allison Schulnik. They live together with their daughter in Sky Valley, California.

== Exhibitions ==
=== Solo ===
- 2013 Ebony & Benghazi, Ambach & Rice, Los Angeles
- 2012 Virgin Birth n' Turf, The Hole, NYC
- 2012 Party Sub/Sub Party, The Armory Show, NYC, Ambach & Rice
- 2011 Cracks of Dawn, Ambach &Rice @ Kunsthalle L.A., Chinatown, Los Angeles, CA
- 2010 Nervous Surf, Galerie Jeanroch Dard, Paris France
- 2009 Naughty Teens/Garbanzo Beans, Ambach & Rice, Seattle WA
- 2008 Piano Man (For Guitar), Jack the Pelican Presents, Brooklyn NY
- 2008 Dolly Parton Behind A Tree, Kim Light Gallery (project room), Los Angeles, CA

=== Group ===
2013

- True Believers, Torrance Art Museum, Torrance, CA
- Rogue Wave, L.A. Louver, Venice, CA
- The Archaic Revival, Zic Zerp, Rotterdam, Netherlands (curated by Dani Tull & Ewoud Van Rijn)
- Good Intentions: Re-Imagining Rockwell's Boy Scouts, Subliminal Projects, Los Angeles, CA
- Report on An Unidentified Space Station, Paradise Row @ The Armory Show, NYC

2012

- Portrait of a Generation, The Hole, NYC
- Breadbox, ZieherSmith@Icon Building, Nashville, TN
- Body Snatchers, White Box, NYC (curated by [Raul Zamudio])
- Visible, Harris Art Gallery, University of La Verne (curated by Dion Johnson)
- The Right Wrong, Greene Exhibitions, Culver City, CA
- Facial Expressionism: Immanence Envisaged, Cerritos College, Norwalk, CA (curated by James MacDevitt)
- In the Future the Artist Will Say: That Object is a Work of Art, 3rd Ward, Brooklyn, NY
- Celebrity Skin, White Box Contemporary, San Diego, CA
- Where My Cones At?, Double Break Gallery, San Diego, CA

2011

- will be home..., Ambach & Rice, Los Angeles, CA
- B-B-B-BAD, Anna Kustera Gallery, New York, NY (curated by Doug McClemont and Billy Miller)
- Telephone, Torrance Art Museum, Torrance, CA
- FACEMAKER, Royal-T, Los Angeles, CA (curated by Kathy Grayson)
- Nothing To Say, Guerrero Gallery, San Francisco, CA

2010

- Gray Day, Roberts & Tilton, Culver City, CA (curated by Noah Davis)
- Suspension of Disbelief, Other Gallery, Shanghai, China (curated by Raul Zamudio)
- Playboys and Killjoys, AMBACH & RICE, Seattle, WA
- Veel/Plenty, Voorkamer, Lier, Belgium
- Meer/More, Voorkamer, Lier, Belgium
- The Power of Selection, Pt.3, Western Exhibitions, Chicago, IL
- Session_12_Words + Untitled, Four Boxes Gallery, Skive, Denmark
- The Weight of the Words, Stuffinablank.com, online exhibition (curated by Pedro Torres)
- Instant L.A. Summer, Carmichael Gallery, Los Angeles, CA
- Sonny Smith: 100 Records, Gallery 16, San Francisco, CA (traveled to: Okay Mtn. Gallery, Austin, TX/
- Cinders Gallery, Brooklyn, NY/ False Front Gallery, Portland, OR)
- Bushwick Schlacht!, Fortress to Solitude, Bushwick, NY
- Inaugural Exhibition, Guerrero Gallery, San Francisco, CA
- Fuckheads, Kinkead Contemporary, Los Angeles, CA (curated by Angela Dufresne)
- Paper! Awesome!, Baer Ridgway Gallery, San Francisco, CA (curated by Brion Nuda Rosch)
- Riders, Galerie Polad-Hardouin, Paris, France
- The Power of Selection, Pt.1, Western Exhibitions, Chicago, IL (curated by Ryan Travis Christian)

2009

- Baker's Dozen, Torrance Art Museum, Torrance, CA
- Session_7_Words, Am Nuden Da, London, England
- Ulli and Lucrecia's Lustige Gruppenausstellung Mit Party, 533 Gallery, Los Angeles, CA
- Interrobang, Space Gallery, Portland, ME
- Beautiful/Decay: A to Z, Kopeikin Gallery, Los Angeles, CA
- control c, control v, eberb9, Chicago, IL
- The Haunted House Show, Colin Roberts' Studio, Los Angeles, CA
- No Right Beast, Women's Building, Los Angeles, CA

2008

- L.A. Potential, HangART-7, Salzburg, Austria (curated by Hubert Schmalix, Roger Herman)
- HangART-7, Salzburg, Austria (curated by Hubert Schmalix, Roger Herman)
- Found/Gevonden/TrouveVoorkamer, Lier, Belgium
- Women's Building, Los Angeles, CA
