= Peter Mehlman =

American entertainer

- Born: 1955 or 1956 (age 69–70)
- Education: University of Maryland
- Occupation: Screenwriter

Peter Mehlman (born 1955 or 1956) is an American television writer, comedian, and producer, best known for serving as a writer and producer on the TV series Seinfeld through nearly all of the show's nine-year run from 1989 to 1998.

He also created the 1999 series It's Like, You Know... and produced the 2004 animated series Father of the Pride. Both were short-lived.

== Early life ==
Mehlman grew up in a Jewish family in New York City. He graduated from the University of Maryland in 1977.

== Career ==
=== Early career ===
Peter Mehlman began his career as a sportswriter for The Washington Post. He made his first move from print journalism to television writing when, from 1982 to 1984, he wrote for and produced the television series SportsBeat with Howard Cosell. For the next five years he returned to freelance magazine writing in New York for magazines such as The New York Times Magazine, GQ and Esquire.

=== Work on Seinfeld ===
In 1989, Mehlman moved to Los Angeles and was offered the opportunity to write a script for Seinfeld by Larry David. As he had never written a script up to that point ("Pre-Seinfeld, I'd barely written any dialogue in my life"), Mehlman submitted instead a short humorous piece he had written for the New York Times Magazine. Jerry Seinfeld was so impressed by the piece that he gave Mehlman a writing assignment, out of which came the series' first freelance episode, "The Apartment." Mehlman was hired for the first full season of Seinfeld as a program consultant (1991–92) and, over the next six years, worked his way up to co-executive producer in the show's last season after Larry David's departure.

Describing the process of writing for Seinfeld and evaluating his own work on the show, Mehlman wrote in an article for Entertainment Weekly:

Seinfeld was the only show in which you came up with your own story lines or you were gone. There was no "writers' room." You wrote and rewrote your own scripts before kissing them off to Larry David and Jerry so they could dose it with magic. I was ready to say I did bad work on "The Visa", better on "The Sponge", really good on "The Implant". I was ready to argue that my episodes showed signs of a sensibility: A bunch dealt with radically changing one's appearance; a clump with contraception; a batch had people trying to be someone else; almost all had friends drastically at cross-purposes. My story lines were truly "about nothing." (Except when they weren't: It took me weeks to realize that my friend's experience with a valet parker's BO would make a funny episode. Too broad of an idea for me to see.).

On the subject of how Seinfeld was different from all other network shows, Mehlman commented:

It broke all their rules about likable characters, setup/punchline dialogue, everything. It didn't fall into one of their comfort zones, like A classic fish-out-of-water story! (FYI: Fish, when out of water, die.) And the fact that Seinfeld never had touching moments made the networks apoplectic.

A writer for The Morning Call said, "Everyone talks about the damage done when Jerry's cocreator and former executive producer Larry David left the series in 1996. But Seinfeld may have suffered the death blow when writer and coexecutive producer Peter Mehlman, who helped steer the show after David left, departed for Steven Spielberg's DreamWorks at the end of last season." She pointed to important elements that Mehlman created for the series, such as:

- Elaine shoving Jerry and others while exclaiming "Get out!!" for the first time;
- The question whether Teri Hatcher has a breast implant and George's double-dipping his chip at a snack table (both in "The Implant");
- George's thinking he has turned Susan to lesbianism ("The Smelly Car");
- Jerry and girlfriend Courteney Cox pretending to be married to get a drycleaner's discount, only to end up bickering like old marrieds ("The Wife");
- George feeling left out on a visit to The Hamptons because everyone else got to see his date topless ("The Hamptons");
- The word shrinkage "enters our vocabulary", as do "the sponge" ("The Sponge") and "yada yada" ("The Yada Yada").

=== Post-Seinfeld work ===
In 1999, Mehlman created, produced and co-wrote the sitcom It's Like, You Know..., which was primarily a bitter satire of life in Los Angeles and the Hollywood notables and idle rich who live there, as seen through the eyes of Manhattan writer, Garment (played by Chris Eigeman). The show was often described as a Los Angeles version of Seinfeld. Despite being nominated for "New Program of the Year" at the Television Critics Association Awards in 1999, the show was canceled by ABC after 26 episodes, mostly to clear more time slots for Who Wants to Be a Millionaire?.

Mehlman commented afterward that he found the studio interference from ABC a problem during the show's production, and after the show was canceled commented that he "wouldn't do another show for ABC if the future of Israel depended on it."

"When ABC execs gave me their first note on the script—a small plot change—I pondered it and said, No, I think it's good the way it is. What else you got? The ABC brass looked at me as if I'd announced I was pro-pedophilia. My first experience with network interference. Seinfeld had no network interference."

He then wrote a TV pilot called The White Album, which he described as "a dark, comic, serialized murder mystery", but he failed to find a network which would produce it.

Since May 2005, Mehlman has contributed articles for the progressive news website The Huffington Post. He has written editorial articles on such topics as O. J. Simpson, Mel Gibson and the Saddam Hussein trial and hanging.

In June 2007 he claimed that, unlike Adolf Hitler and Joseph Stalin, the George W. Bush administration didn't even mean well to its constituency.

In 2009, he wrote and produced the online comedy series Peter Mehlman's Narrow World of Sports, a series of 13 humorous interviews with sports figures such as Kobe Bryant, Danica Patrick and Tony Hawk. The series was sponsored by the Palm Pre and aired on YouTube. It was nominated for a Webby Award in 2010 for "Best Reality/Variety Host".

== Seinfeld episodes written by Mehlman ==
Season 2

- "The Apartment" – Mehlman pitched an idea where Elaine wants to leave the city, but Larry David, Larry Charles and Jerry Seinfeld suggested Elaine move closer to Jerry rather than further away.

Season 3

- "The Nose Job" – Based on a father of Mehlman's friend, who owned a store, and spoke his mind to his customers.
- "The Good Samaritan"

Season 4

- "The Virgin"
- "The Visa"
- "The Implant"
- "The Smelly Car" (with Larry David) – A friend of Peter Mehlman's told a story about a smelly car whose odor could not be defeated.

Season 5

- "The Masseuse"
- "The Wife"
- "The Hamptons" (with Carol Leifer)

Season 6

- "The Chinese Woman"
- "The Scofflaw"
- "Highlights of a Hundred, Part 1"
- "Highlights of a Hundred, Part 2"

Season 7

- "The Sponge"
- "The Shower Head" (with Marjorie Gross)
- "The Wait Out" (with Matt Selman)

Season 8

- "The Soul Mate"
- "The Money"
- "The Yada Yada" (with Jill Franklyn)

Season 9

- "The Betrayal" (with David Mandel)
- "The Maid" (with Alec Berg, Jeff Schaffer, David Mandel, and Kit Boss)
