= The Wife (Seinfeld) =

- Seinfeld episode
- Episode no.: Season 5 Episode 17
- Directed by: Tom Cherones
- Written by: Peter Mehlman
- Production code: 517
- Original air date: March 17, 1994

Guest appearances
- Courteney Cox as Meryl; Barney Martin as Morty Seinfeld; Liz Sheridan as Helen Seinfeld; Scott LaRose as Greg; Len Lesser as Uncle Leo; Joseph Ragno as Marty; Rebecca Glenn as Paula; Nick LaTour as Grandpa; Susan Segal as Waitress; Lili Bernard as Anna; Lawrence Mandley as Owner

Episode chronology
← Previous "The Stand In"	Next → "The Raincoats"
- Seinfeld season 5

"The Wife" is the 81st episode of the NBC sitcom Seinfeld. The 17th episode of the fifth season, it was originally broadcast on March 17, 1994. In this episode, Jerry and his girlfriend roleplay as husband and wife for a dry cleaning discount. A fellow health club member gives Elaine mixed romantic signals, while planning to get George thrown out for urinating in the shower. Jerry's quasi-wife was played by Courteney Cox, just prior to Cox's breakthrough as a star. For the syndicated repeats, this episode is just one of a few this season to keep Jerry's opening stand-up routine intact.

== Plot ==
Jerry and his girlfriend Meryl flirt playfully after a night together. Jerry finds a locket in his dry-cleaned jacket and returns it to the dry cleaner. Grateful to get his cherished memento back, the owner gives a 25% discount for Jerry and his family. Meryl spontaneously claims to be Jerry's wife, and Jerry plays along amorously. They carry on their act over breakfast at Monk's, where, following the example of Kramer and his African-American girlfriend Anna, they bring along "outside syrup" for their pancakes.

Waiting for George at the health club, Elaine runs into fellow member Greg, who surprises her with an open-lipped kiss; Elaine becomes interested in Greg because he otherwise negs her. George fails to meet up because Greg saw him urinating in the shower. Kramer wheedles Jerry into taking his quilt for the discount; Jerry runs into Meryl and Uncle Leo back at the dry cleaner, and is forced to drop his "marriage" bombshell on his unsuspecting uncle.

Elaine searches for romantic signals in everything Greg does. She goes from disappointment when he wipes off a water bottle she shares with him, to encouragement when he fails to wipe off his sweat-drenched exercise machine for her. Because Greg plans to get George kicked out of the club, George demands that Elaine threaten to report Greg's sweaty machine as leverage, unsympathetic that this would torpedo Elaine's chances with Greg. However, Greg actually had eyes for the club manager all along, tipping Elaine over to George's side.

Jerry and Meryl bicker like an old married couple over a missing can opener, then make up at bedtime as they sleep platonically. Jerry meets an attractive woman who cannot afford dry cleaning, and adulterously gives her his discount despite her guilty conscience. When Meryl finds the other woman's laundry, Jerry demands a "divorce", and they realize that a pretend marriage was more than they were ready for. Meryl leaves, keeping Jerry's syrup to remember him by.

Kramer is so sleep-deprived without his quilt that he starts keeling over and looking pale. He goes for a tan to make himself presentable to meet Anna's parents, but falls asleep on the tanning bed. He gets so tanned as to look made up in blackface, appalling Anna's family.

== Production ==
After filming, the producers belatedly decided that they wanted the character of Paula to be more exotic, so they hired a voice actress to dub over all of Rebecca Glenn's speech, reciting all the same dialogue in a French accent.
