= The Stand In (Seinfeld) =

- Seinfeld episode
- Episode no.: Season 5 Episode 16
- Directed by: Tom Cherones
- Written by: Larry David
- Production code: 516
- Original air date: February 24, 1994

Guest appearances
- Danny Woodburn as Mickey; Mark Tymchyshyn as Phil; Karla Tamburrelli as Daphne; Debbie Lee Carrington as Tammy; W. Earl Brown as Al; Michael Rivkin as Fulton; Joe Gieb as Johnny; Layne Beamer as Father; Thomas Dekker as Son; Jerome Betler as Director

Episode chronology
← Previous "The Pie"	Next → "The Wife"
- Seinfeld season 5

"The Stand In" is the 80th episode of the NBC sitcom Seinfeld. This was the 16th episode of the fifth season. It aired on February 24, 1994. In this episode, Jerry struggles to get a hospitalized friend to laugh, George commits to a woman he does not like out of sheer spite, and Kramer pressures his friend Mickey Abbott, a little person, to commit taboo "heightening".

== Plot ==
George is hopelessly bored by dating Daphne, since they always end up reading the news in silence, while their mutual friend Al Netche gushes over his own chatty romance. Al suggests that Jerry help cheer up their hospitalized friend, Fulton. Jerry takes the task so seriously that he sweats bullets entertaining Fulton, who is so morose that Jerry cannot land a single joke. Jerry reminisces about their friend "Pachyderm" trying to chat up a woman only to drop hot pizza slices on both their faces, but this too falls flat.

Kramer and his friend Mickey Abbott, a little person, are both working as stand-ins on All My Children, but Mickey is standing in for a child actor who is quickly outgrowing Mickey's height. Kramer twists Mickey's arm to wear lifts to keep his job, even though this is "not done". This subtle difference makes waves among the little people on set, with Tammy becoming attracted to Mickey while Mickey's rival Johnny Bigiano becomes suspicious.

George is about to break up with Daphne, but learns that Al warned her of George's fear of commitment. George commits himself to Daphne to prove Al wrong, despite liking her even less as a result. He declares that he will even marry Daphne just to spite Al.

Jerry vouches for his friend Phil Totola to Elaine, and sets them up on a date. Elaine cracks up Phil with the "Pachyderm" story, and they hit it off, but she is disgusted when Phil has his genitals out for no apparent reason as they sit in his car. Later, Phil is entirely oblivious to why Elaine was turned off, even as he complains about a woman breastfeeding in public.

Mickey discovers that Johnny found the lifts in his locker, and regrets letting Kramer talk him into breaking the unwritten rules against "heightening". Mickey gets outed, and all the little people on set shun him in disappointed silence as he defends himself. When Tammy leaves with Johnny, Mickey tackles Kramer to the ground in fury.

Fulton's wife blames Jerry for Fulton getting sicker, and Jerry begs for another chance, promising that his latest act "killed" on stage. This time, Jerry is so funny that Fulton, gasping for breath, dies from laughter. George is freed from his commitment when Daphne turns him down for "Pachyderm"—revealing that she was the woman he dropped the pizza on.

== Production ==
Larry David got the idea for the Mickey Abbott plot when he noticed how many little people worked as stand-ins for child actors (little people are preferred over children as stand-ins because children cannot legally work as many hours a day as adults). Michael Richards recalled being immediately excited by his work with Danny Woodburn, the actor who plays Mickey, due to the chemistry between their two characters. In the scene where Mickey tackles Kramer, Richards wore a back brace and padding so that he could take a full fall without injury. The scene where Mickey corrects George over him using the word midget instead of little people was added by Woodburn who insisted that a moment like that be added. He further believes that his toughened reaction is what earned him the chance to reappear in the series.

A man exposing his penis on a date was drawn from a real date staff writer Carol Leifer had.

== Reception ==
David Sims of The A.V. Club gave the episode a B grade saying: "[The episode] is not a great episode, especially considering Larry David wrote it, but it's got some very impressive touches, and Phil Totola's dick move (pardon the pun) is one of them."
