= The Implant =

- Seinfeld episode
- Episode no.: Season 4 Episode 19
- Directed by: Tom Cherones
- Written by: Peter Mehlman
- Production code: 419
- Original air date: February 25, 1993

Guest appearances
- Teri Hatcher as Sidra; Megan Mullally as Betsy; Tony Amendola as Rushdie; Carol Rosenthal as Ticket Clerk; Donald Bishop as Dr. Allenwood; Kieran Mulroney as Timmy

Episode chronology
← Previous "The Old Man"	Next → "The Junior Mint"
- Seinfeld season 4

"The Implant" is the 59th episode of the sitcom Seinfeld. It is the 19th episode of the fourth season, and first aired on February 25, 1993 on NBC. In this episode, Elaine investigates whether Jerry is dating a woman with breast implants, and George tries to legitimize himself as his girlfriend's boyfriend by accompanying her to a funeral in Detroit. This episode popularized the term "double dipping" entering the public lexicon.

== Plot ==
After enjoying his first date with Sidra, Jerry runs into her at their health club. Elaine is sure, at a glance, that Sidra has breast implants, so Jerry sends her to get proof for him. After Elaine double-checks, Jerry decides not to see Sidra again.

After nine dates with Betsy, George has failed to put the moves on her, being deprived of his dominant hand when she sits on his right side. He learns that she does so because she is deaf in her right ear, but switches places anyway to make his move. George dismisses a sudden phone call as not an emergency, but it brings news that Betsy's aunt has died.

Kramer misses the warm weather in Los Angeles, while claiming that he saw author Salman Rushdie at the health club. In the sauna, Jerry and Kramer suggest that George would be legitimized as Betsy's boyfriend by accompanying her to the funeral in Detroit, and Kramer schemes to help George get a bereavement discount to earn frequent flier miles for himself. They learn that a death certificate is required to claim the discount post-flight.

In the sauna, Elaine finds Sidra complaining about Jerry, who used his "old girlfriend" as an excuse to break up. Elaine trips and grabs onto Sidra's breasts to break her fall. She reassesses Sidra's breasts as being real and "spectacular", to Jerry's anguish. Kramer books a flight to Puerto Rico with his miles, and tries to identify Rushdie without asking outright, due to the fatwa against him. In the sauna, the lookalike claims to be "Sal Bass", a writer, which Kramer takes to be coded wordplay for his real name.

At the wake in Detroit, George offers to get Betsy snacks, but gorges himself while making excuses to secure the death certificate. He thoughtlessly double-dips a chip, then doubles down when Betsy's brother Timmy confronts him. Timmy tries to stop George by force, starting a fracas, and Betsy throws George out.

Sidra meets at Jerry's, despite her displeasure. He sits on her left to use his dominant hand to put the moves on her, and lets her tease him about whether her breasts are real. Jerry dismisses sudden pounding on the door as not an emergency, but finally lets in Kramer, who wants to borrow his bathing suit, and Elaine, who is sharing photos of her Puerto Rico trip with Jerry. Sidra deduces that Elaine is the "old girlfriend" and that Jerry sent her. She leaves, but not before taunting Jerry with her real and "spectacular" breasts.

George's bereavement discount claim is shown up as blatantly fraudulent when he brings back only a photo of himself next to the casket as proof.

== Production ==
During the taping, Larry David asked Teri Hatcher to add the line "And, by the way, they're real, and they're spectacular," which was not in the script.

== Reception ==
The television show MythBusters tested the theory that double dipping was like "putting your whole mouth right in the dip" on the April 22, 2009 episode. The MythBusters found that double-dipping produced fewer microbes than putting all the dip in your mouth. Also, the number of microbes present was negligible compared to the amount found in a regular dip.

In Salman Rushdie's non-fiction book Joseph Anton: A Memoir, Rushdie recounts bumping into Jerry Seinfeld at a cocktail party where Seinfeld nervously asked his opinion of "The Implant" and "visibly relaxed" upon Rushdie's telling him "that he had thought the episode very funny."
