= HouseholdHacker =

American YouTube channel

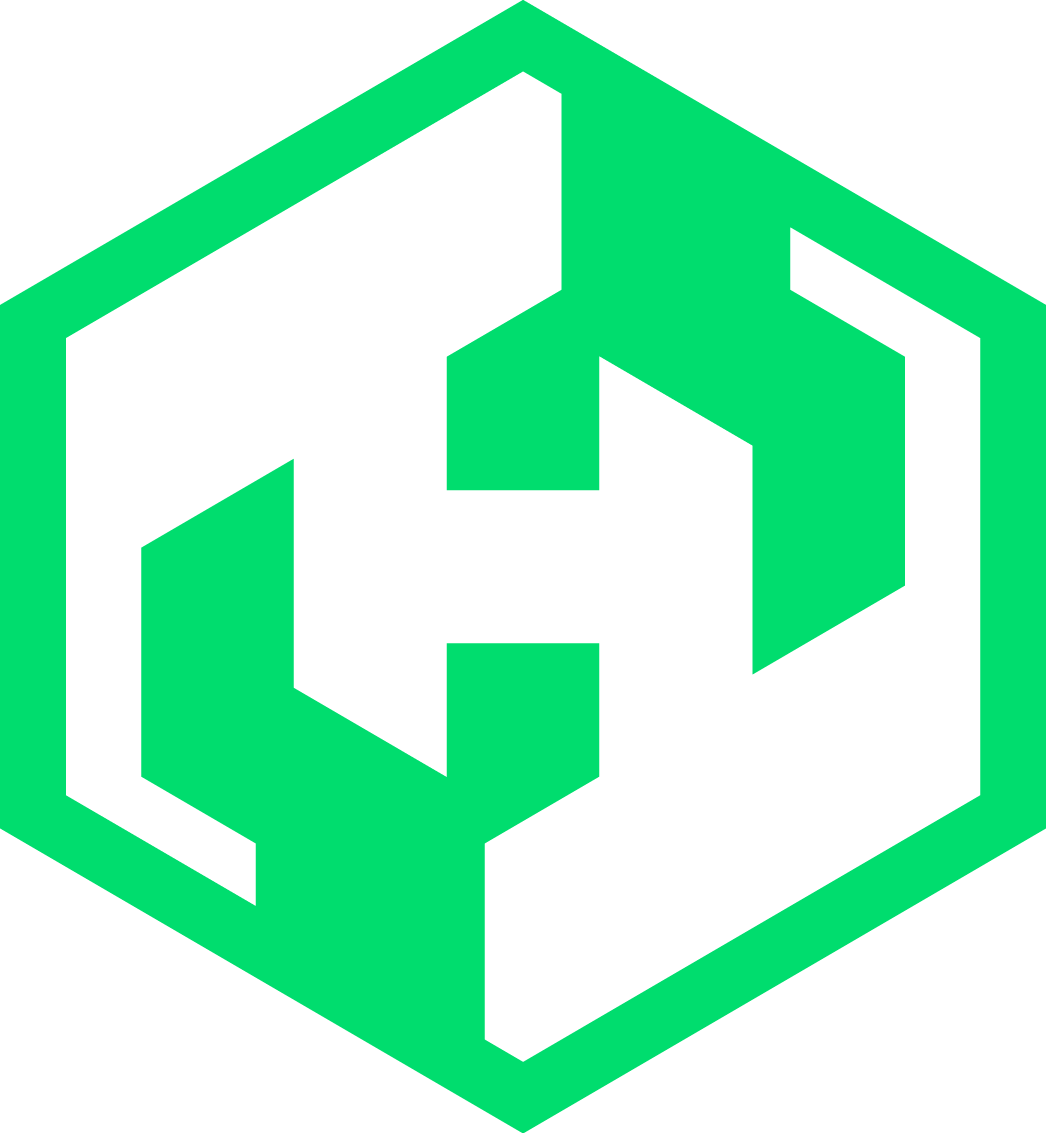
- HouseholdHacker Logo

YouTube information
- Channel: HouseholdHacker
- Years active: 2007–2021 (YouTube)
- Genre: How-to
- Subscribers: 4.7 million
- Views: 936 million
- Last updated: October 25, 2025

HouseholdHacker is an inactive YouTube channel that posted videos of various "hacks", or quick solutions to common everyday problems. As of July 2022, the channel has 4.87 million subscribers and over 929 million views. The group is primarily known for its 2007 hoax video which claimed one could charge an iPod battery using an onion and Gatorade. The video fooled normally reliable sources, and drew the attention of the MythBusters among others. A few additional hoax videos followed, but drew less attention.

== Background ==
According to the HouseholdHacker YouTube channel page: "At HouseholdHacker, we solve your common everyday problems and create things utilizing items you find around your house. You might say we try to bring out the MacGyver in all of us. From kitchen hacks and tricks to getting rid of ants; we do it all." HouseholdHacker was started by Dylan Hart and Traveler.

HouseholdHacker was launched in November 2007 and quickly attracted interest, becoming YouTube's most subscribed channel for the month of December 2007. By January 2009, HouseholdHacker was the 22nd most subscribed YouTube channel. As of February 28, 2021, they have over 4.96 million subscribers. In November 2022, that number fell to 4.85 million subscribers.

Dylan Hart
- Born: 1982
- Died: November 6, 2020
- Years active: 2007-2021

== iPod Onion ==
In November 2007, HouseholdHacker released a video entitled "How to Charge an iPod using electrolytes and an onion." The video, which claimed to demonstrate how one could recharge an iPod using little more than Gatorade and a white onion, was an overnight success. The video drew the attention of The Unofficial Apple Weblog, which reported it as fact. Within its first week, the video had been viewed over 4 million times.

By the following November, the video had been viewed more than 7 million times (currently over 10 million) and attracted the attention of ABC News, who asked "Can an Onion Charge an iPod?" ABC put the video to the test, but failed to obtain the promised result. Reporter Emily Friedman remarked "this appears to be an iFraud."

The TV show MythBusters also put the onion video to the test in 2008. In a segment dubbed "iOnion," Grant Imahara was unable to get any charge from the onion setup found in the HouseholdHacker video. He explained that the setup lacked the crucial anode and cathode that would be required to get the electrolytes found in Gatorade moving and concluded the video was a complete hoax. In an interview with ABCNews, Adam Savage called the video "complete horse shit."

=== Appeal ===
The iPod onion video fooled a number of normally savvy folks, or at least had them trying the technique out for themselves, which has led to several theories as to why it was so appealing. Farhad Manjoo of Salon speculated that it was the style in which the video was delivered. "He's got a friendly, helpful voice, but he's not casual – he speaks in the formal, confident manner of a TV how-to guy," says Manjoo. Anna Solana of La Vanguardia, on the other hand, speculated that it was the "science" itself that attracted the viewers, remarking that something so magical "freaks" people out and makes them want to believe.

== Follow-up videos ==
Following the iPod onion video, HouseholdHacker has released a number of videos that have generated some attention. A March 2008 video entitled "How to Cheat on any Test" has attracted 8 million views and the ire of some school teachers. Another video entitled "How to Create a High-Def speaker for under a buck" again drew the attention of the show MythBusters. Tory Belleci followed the instructions in the video, but when it came time to plug in the speakers nothing happened. In addition to disproving the video, he pointed out that the "under a buck" part of the claim was also false, noting that a single minijack alone typically costs about $10 retail. However, it is possible to get minijack cables for under a dollar online.

== Death of channel creator ==
On February 28, 2021, Scott Kinmartin, the lead content producer for the channel, announced in a now-unavailable video that Dylan Hart died on November 6, 2020. Hart was 38 years old. According to Kinmartin on Twitter, Hart died due to "medical complications", but the exact cause of death was never revealed, possibly due to privacy reasons.
