= It's Like, You Know... =

- Cast of the show
- Created by: Peter Mehlman
- Starring: Steven Eckholdt; Chris Eigeman; Evan Handler; A. J. Langer; Jennifer Grey
- Composer: W. G. Snuffy Walden
- Country of origin: United States
- Original language: English
- No. of seasons: 2
- No. of episodes: 26 (7 unaired)

Production
- Executive producers: Peter Mehlman; Ted Harbert
- Running time: 30 minutes
- Production companies: 42 Pound Productions; EWH3 Productions; DreamWorks Television

Original release
- Network: ABC
- Release: March 24, 1999 – January 5, 2000

It's Like, You Know... is an American sitcom television series broadcast by ABC. It starred Steven Eckholdt, Chris Eigeman, Evan Handler, A. J. Langer, and Jennifer Grey, and depicted life in Los Angeles as viewed through the eyes of Eigeman's character, a diehard New Yorker named Arthur Garment. The series aired for two seasons, from March 24, 1999, until January 5, 2000.

== Synopsis ==
The show sought to lampoon an upper class Los Angeles lifestyle, in part by presenting the Manhattan writer, Garment, as a fish out of water among Hollywood notables and the idle rich. In the pilot his character arrives with unconcealed hostility, intent on treating his readers to a bitter satire on the absurdities and excesses of LA culture. While staying with an old friend from college, Garment finds himself increasingly torn between button-down stern contempt for West Coast attitudes and a growing enchantment with the relaxed whimsy constantly swirling around him.

The show was heavily marketed as ABC's answer to the recently concluded NBC show Seinfeld. Despite longtime Seinfeld writers Peter Mehlman and Carol Leifer driving the show's scripts, it failed to capture the same audience.

The show was also notable for featuring the actress Jennifer Grey playing herself, the source of a running joke related to her real-life rhinoplasty.

== Cast ==
- Steven Eckholdt as Robbie Graham
- Chris Eigeman as Arthur Garment
- Evan Handler as Shrug
- A. J. Langer as Lauren Woods
- Jennifer Grey as Herself

== Episodes ==
=== Series overview ===
| Season | Episodes | Originally released | |
| Season | Episodes | First released | Last released |
|---|---|---|---|
| 1 | 7 | March 24, 1999 | May 5, 1999 |
| 2 | 18 | September 21, 1999 | January 5, 2000 |

=== Season 1 (1999) ===
| No. overall | No. in season | Title | Directed by | Written by | Original release date | Prod. code | Viewers (millions) |
|---|---|---|---|---|---|---|---|
| TBA | TBA | "Pilot" | John Whitesell | N/A | Unaired | 17-98-100 | N/A |
Note: This is the series' original pilot, which went unaired.
| 1 | 1 | "Welcome to L.A." | Andy Ackerman | Peter Mehlman | March 24, 1999 | 17-98-101 | 12.01 |
| 2 | 2 | "The Getaway" | John Whitesell | Peter Mehlman | March 31, 1999 | 17-98-102 | 14.20 |
| 3 | 3 | "Memories of Me" | John Whitesell | Peter Mehlman & Jon Hayman | April 7, 1999 | 17-98-105 | 10.48 |
| 4 | 4 | "The Client" | John Whitesell | Richard Doctorow | April 14, 1999 | 17-98-103 | 9.96 |
| 5 | 5 | "Two Days in the Valley" | John Whitesell | Dawn Urbant | April 21, 1999 | 17-98-104 | 8.91 |
| 6 | 6 | "Author! Author!" | John Fortenberry | Jennifer Eolin | April 28, 1999 | 17-98-111 | 9.51 |
| 7 | 7 | "The Conversation" | John Fortenberry | Peter Mehlman | May 5, 1999 | 17-98-107 | 9.10 |

=== Season 2 (1999–2000) ===
| No. overall | No. in season | Title | Directed by | Written by | Original release date | Prod. code | Viewers (millions) |
|---|---|---|---|---|---|---|---|
| 8 | 1 | "Twins" | John Fortenberry | Carol Leifer | September 21, 1999 | 17-99-201 | 10.41 |
| 9 | 2 | "Enchanted April" | John Fortenberry | Peter Mehlman | September 28, 1999 | 17-99-203 | 8.33 |
| 10 | 3 | "The Long Goodbye" | John Fortenberry | Peter Mehlman & Jon Hayman | October 5, 1999 | 17-98-112 | 10.92 |
| 11 | 4 | "Coast to Coast" | John Fortenberry | Jon Hayman | October 12, 1999 | 17-99-204 | 9.84 |
| 12 | 5 | "Arthur 2: On the Rocks" | John Fortenberry | Richard Doctorow | October 19, 1999 | 17-99-205 | 8.54 |
| 13 | 6 | "Lost in America" | John Fortenberry | Jill Franklyn | October 26, 1999 | 17-99-206 | 9.35 |
| 14 | 7 | "The Sweet Smell of Success" | John Fortenberry | Bill Masters | November 2, 1999 | 17-99-207 | 8.96 |
| 15 | 8 | "Hollywood Shuffle" | Leonard R. Garner Jr. | Story by : Etan Cohen; Teleplay by : Carol Leifer & Peter Mehlman | December 8, 1999 | 17-99-208 | 9.55 |
| 16 | 9 | "The Life of Brian" | Leonard R. Garner Jr. | Richard Doctorow & Jill Franklyn | December 15, 1999 | 17-99-212 | 8.82 |
| 17 | 10 | "Summer of '42" | Leonard R. Garner Jr. | Story by : Bill Masters; Teleplay by : Carol Leifer & Peter Mehlman | December 22, 1999 | 17-99-209 | 8.37 |
| 18 | 11 | "The Apartment" | Joe Regalbuto | Etan Cohen | December 29, 1999 | 17-99-210 | 7.50 |
| 19 | 12 | "Heat" | John Fortenberry | Peter Mehlman | January 5, 2000 | 17-99-213 | 8.61 |
| 20 | 13 | "Trading Places" | John Whitesell | Jeff Astrof & Mike Sikowitz | Unaired | 17-98-106 | N/A |
| 21 | 14 | "Walking Tall" | John Fortenberry | Amy Welsh | Unaired | 17-98-108 | N/A |
| 22 | 15 | "The Quick and the Dead" | John Fortenberry | Allison Adler | Unaired | 17-98-109 | N/A |
| 23 | 16 | "Raw Deal" | John Fortenberry | Story by : Jeffrey Mehlman; Teleplay by : Peter Mehlman & Jon Hayman | Unaired | 17-98-110 | N/A |
| 24 | 17 | "Lust for Life" | John Fortenberry | Peter Mehlman | Unaired | 17-99-202 | N/A |
| 25 | 18 | "Hoop Dreams" | John Fortenberry | Peter Mehlman | Unaired | 17-99-211 | N/A |

== Broadcast ==
When ABC canceled the series, seven episodes remained unaired (six episodes from the planned second season, in addition to the original unaired pilot). These episodes have since aired abroad, including in Argentina on Fox Latin America and in Australia on The Comedy Channel.

== Reception ==
Ratings for the series were low, due in part to the sudden explosion of reality programming and ABC's decision to dedicate much of its primetime schedule to the then-popular Who Wants to Be a Millionaire.
