= The Raincoats (Seinfeld) =

- Seinfeld episodes
- Episode nos.: Season 5 Episodes 18/19
- Directed by: Tom Cherones
- Written by: Tom Gammill; Max Pross; Larry David; Jerry Seinfeld
- Production code: 518/519
- Original air date: April 28, 1994
- Running time: 42 minutes

Guest appearances
- Wayne Knight as Newman; Jerry Stiller as Frank Costanza; Estelle Harris as Estelle Costanza; Barney Martin as Morty Seinfeld; Liz Sheridan as Helen Seinfeld; Sandy Baron as Jack Klompus; Michael G. Hagerty as Rudy; Dorien Wilson as Alec; Stephen Pearlman as Mr Goldstein; Annie Korzen as Doris; Judge Reinhold as Aaron; Melanie Smith as Rachel; LaRita Shelby as Tour Leader; Jason Manary as Joey

Episode chronology
← Previous "The Wife"	Next → "The Fire"
- Seinfeld season 5

"The Raincoats" is a two-part episode of the American sitcom Seinfeld. It is the 82nd and 83rd episode of the show, and the 18th and 19th episodes of the fifth season. The episode was first shown on NBC on April 28, 1994, and garnered a Primetime Emmy Award nomination for Outstanding Guest Actor in a Comedy Series for Judge Reinhold.

The episode was written by Tom Gammill, Max Pross, Larry David and Jerry Seinfeld, and directed by Tom Cherones. In this episode, Morty partners with Kramer to sell off some vintage raincoats with only days before he and Helen leave for Paris; Elaine's boyfriend devotes himself to Morty and Helen; George tries to get out of mentoring for Big Brother, and sells his father's old clothes behind his back; and Jerry and his girlfriend cannot resist making out during the film Schindler's List (1993).

== Plot ==
=== Part 1 ===
Jerry is sending his parents Helen and Morty to Paris for their anniversary, but he counts the days until they leave and he can finally have his girlfriend Rachel over after weeks apart. George gets recruited as a Big Brother mentor to young Joey. George decides to fake his own Paris trip to get out of this, and ropes in Jerry's parents to mail postcards from Paris in his name.

Kramer is wearing vintage clothes from Rudy's, from the wardrobes of the newly deceased—reminding George of his father Frank's old clothes in the attic. To dodge George's invitation to dinner with his parents, Jerry's parents lie about having plans; Jerry is surprised by his parents confiding that they have never liked the deranged Costanzas.

Elaine's boyfriend Aaron, an uncomfortably "close talker", meets Morty and Helen. Aaron immediately offers franc bills for their trip, then whisks them away to the Metropolitan Museum of Art for a day-long behind-the-scenes tour. Elaine and Jerry are confused by Aaron's devotion to two total strangers.

Morty recognizes Kramer's beltless raincoat as his own poorly selling design, the "Executive". Kramer promises to offload Morty's unsold stock at Rudy's for a finder's fee. However, Morty needs Jack Klompus's help to ship the raincoats to New York before the Paris trip. George's excuse backfires, because Joey happens to need a travel companion to reunite with his father in Paris. Jerry does not let George pawn Joey off on his parents.

The Costanzas haplessly wait two nights for the Seinfelds, Estelle having made too much paella. George steals into the attic in the night, making Frank jumpy that mice have gotten in. Selling Frank's clothes to Rudy, George gets an extra $25 by tearfully eulogizing his "late" father. George finds out the Seinfelds had dinner unplanned with Kramer, and becomes indignant on his parents' behalf. Rudy sells Frank's shirts to Kramer, and is keen to buy Morty's raincoats.

To Elaine's dismay, Aaron enjoyed the Seinfelds' company so much that he brings them along to see My Fair Lady with Elaine, followed by dinner and even a romantic carriage ride. This outing gives Jerry and Rachel some alone time, but not nearly enough. Meanwhile, Jack fails to unlock the Seinfelds' garage to retrieve the raincoats.

George shares in his parents' outrage at being snubbed twice. Frank and Estelle move on to planning a cruise, but Frank complains that he needs his missing "cabana wear" from the attic. Meanwhile, Rudy burns Frank's clothes to purge a moth infestation.

=== Part 2 ===
At Helen's recommendation, Jerry and Rachel go see Schindler's List, but they cannot resist making out through the solemn movie. Kramer and Morty both arrogantly demand a bigger cut of their take, only to split the difference and end up back where they started. George refunds Rudy for the moth infestation, but learns too late that the clothes are gone.

Newman, who saw Jerry and Rachel's indiscretion, gleefully tattles to Helen and Morty, who reprimand Jerry. Jack calls to report that he not only smashed a window to get the raincoats, but also cheaped out on shipping, cutting the delivery too close. Morty chooses the raincoats over the Paris trip because he "can't stop now".

George invites Kramer over to finish off the paella, but Frank recognizes his cabana shirt on Kramer, and George blurts out having sold the clothes. George takes the Seinfelds' forfeited plane tickets for himself and Joey. At the airport, Morty finds the raincoats strewn about because Jack did not tape the box, while George suffers Joey's disrespect.

Back at Rudy's, Frank learns that his "death" netted George $25. Thanks to Frank's moths, Rudy stops buying secondhand clothes, leaving Morty and Kramer holding the bag. Aaron is even more sentimental than Jerry as they see Morty and Helen off back home; guilt-stricken, he laments that he "could have done more" for them at even greater personal expense. Jerry is forbidden from seeing Rachel again after Newman, as postman for Rachel's household, tattled to her morally righteous father. Jerry finds Newman and vengefully chases him.

Morty and Helen return to find the house robbed clean through the broken window. They seek respite on a cruise, but get booked on the same ship as the Costanzas.

== Production ==
Larry David said the idea of making out at Schindler's List "must have come from sitting in temple ... thinking what would happen if I reached over and touched my wife's breast now, or something like that. ... You know, I just can't pay attention in there, and so my mind wanders, and I think that's why I put that in." Jerry Seinfeld commented that Schindler's List was specifically chosen because they knew that the film's director, Steven Spielberg, was a fan of the show. Aaron's dismay when the Seinfelds return to Florida is an allusion to the scene in Schindler's List in which the title character, Oskar Schindler, is in a state of anguish for not being able to do more to help the doomed Jews during the Holocaust.

The "moths" in the show were added in post-production. Stephen Pearlman was unable to be present at the audience taping of the episode due to scheduling conflicts, so Larry David stood in for him during the taping of his scene. The audience's laughter from the performance with David was then applied to a later filming with Pearlman for the broadcast episode.
