= Sky Valley, California =

Sky Valley
- Census-designated place
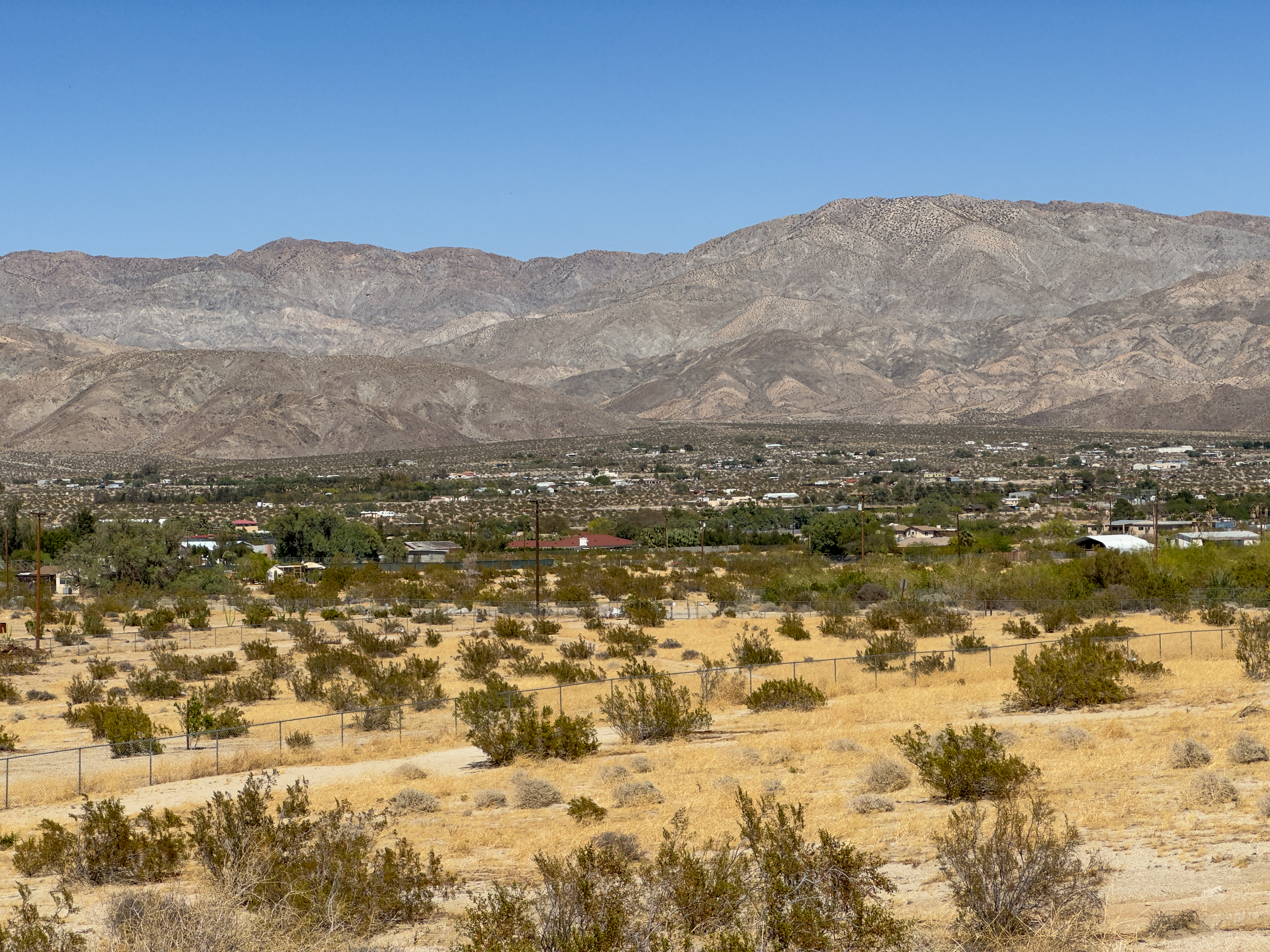
- Sky Valley, California and Little San Bernardino Mountains from Indio Hills

- Location in Riverside County, California

- Position in California.
- Coordinates: 33°53′28″N 116°21′18″W
- Country: United States
- State: California
- County: Riverside

Area
  - Total: 24.319 sq mi (62.986 km^{2})
  - Land: 24.319 sq mi (62.986 km^{2})
  - Water: 0 sq mi (0 km^{2}) 0%
- Elevation: 994 ft (303 m)

Population (2020)
  - Total: 2,411
  - Density: 99.14/sq mi (38.28/km^{2})
- Time zone: UTC-8 (Pacific (PST))
  - Summer (DST): UTC-7 (PDT)
- GNIS feature ID: 2583145

Sky Valley is a census-designated place in Riverside County, California. Sky Valley sits at an elevation of 994 feet (303 m). The 2020 United States census reported Sky Valley's population was 2,411.

== Geography ==
According to the United States Census Bureau, the CDP covers an area of 24.3 square miles (63.0 km^{2}), all of it land.

== Demographics ==
Historical population
Census	Pop.	Note	%±
2010	2,406		—
2020	2,411		0.2%
U.S. Decennial Census; 1860–1870 1880-1890; 1900 1910 1920; 1930 1940 1950; 1960 1970 1980; 1990 2000 2010

Sky Valley first appeared as a census designated place in the 2010 U.S. census.

=== Racial and ethnic composition ===
Sky Valley CDP, California – Racial and ethnic composition Note: the US Census treats Hispanic/Latino as an ethnic category. This table excludes Latinos from the racial categories and assigns them to a separate category. Hispanics/Latinos may be of any race.
Race / Ethnicity (NH = Non-Hispanic)	Pop 2010	Pop 2020	% 2010	% 2020
White alone (NH)	1,623	1,299	67.46%	53.88%
Black or African American alone (NH)	28	32	1.16%	1.33%
Native American or Alaska Native alone (NH)	12	15	0.50%	0.62%
Asian alone (NH)	20	34	0.83%	1.41%
Native Hawaiian or Pacific Islander alone (NH)	3	3	0.12%	0.12%
Other race alone (NH)	4	31	0.17%	1.29%
Mixed race or Multiracial (NH)	34	107	1.41%	4.44%
Hispanic or Latino (any race)	682	890	28.35%	36.91%
Total	2,406	2,411	100.00%	100.00%

=== 2020 census ===
As of the 2020 census, Sky Valley had a population of 2,411. The population density was 99.1 inhabitants per square mile (38.3/km^{2}). The age distribution was 17.3% under the age of 18, 5.6% aged 18 to 24, 20.0% aged 25 to 44, 27.6% aged 45 to 64, and 29.5% who were 65 years of age or older. The median age was 52.8 years. For every 100 females, there were 113.4 males, and for every 100 females age 18 and over, there were 115.7 males age 18 and over.

The census reported that 98.3% of the population lived in households, 1.7% lived in non-institutionalized group quarters, and no one was institutionalized. 2.4% of residents lived in urban areas, while 97.6% lived in rural areas.

There were 967 households, out of which 18.8% included children under the age of 18, 43.3% were married-couple households, 5.4% were cohabiting couple households, 25.5% had a male householder with no spouse or partner present, and 25.7% had a female householder with no spouse or partner present. 32.9% of households were one person, and 18.7% were one person aged 65 or older. The average household size was 2.45. There were 575 families (59.5% of all households).

There were 1,692 housing units at an average density of 69.6 units per square mile (26.9 units/km^{2}). Of these, 967 (57.2%) were occupied and 725 (42.8%) were vacant. Of occupied units, 80.4% were owner-occupied and 19.6% were occupied by renters. The homeowner vacancy rate was 6.2% and the rental vacancy rate was 18.0%.

Racial composition as of the 2020 census
Race	Number	Percent
White	1,435	59.5%
Black or African American	35	1.5%
American Indian and Alaska Native	31	1.3%
Asian	36	1.5%
Native Hawaiian and Other Pacific Islander	3	0.1%
Some other race	510	21.2%
Two or more races	361	15.0%

== Cultural references ==
Seminal desert rock band Kyuss released the highly acclaimed album Welcome to Sky Valley in 1994. The album's cover artwork features a photo of a welcome sign located outside of the town, which has since become an attraction for fans of the band.
