= Michelle Shields =

American actress, model and singer

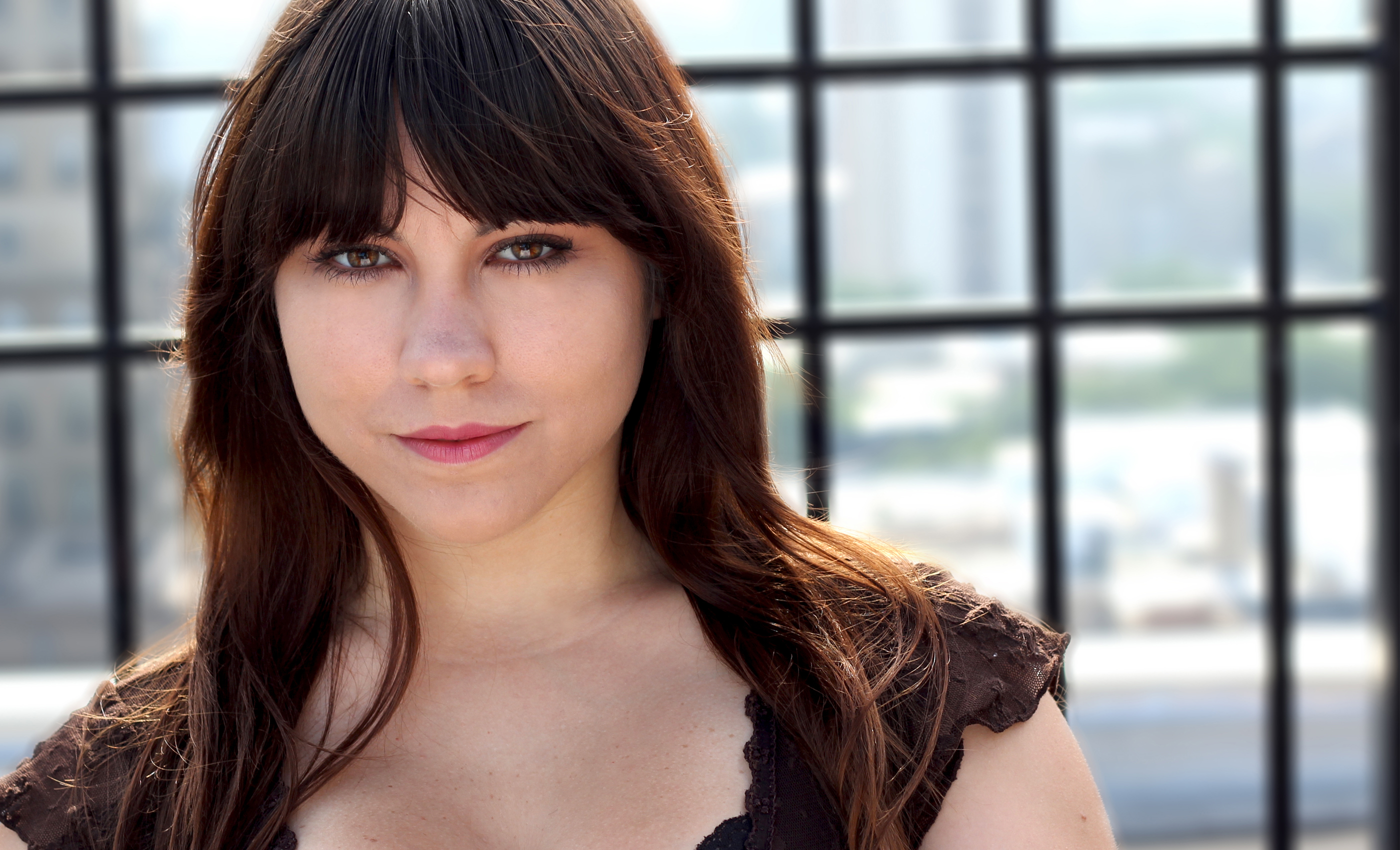
- Michelle Shields, 2011
- Occupation: Actress/model/singer
- Years active: 2005–present

Michelle Shields is an American actress, model and singer. She is primarily known for her roles in various horror films including starring as Elizabeth in Frankenstein: Day of the Beast, acting opposite of horror legend Linnea Quigley in Post Mortem America, 2021 in a featured role, appearing in Sister Mary, and having on screen roles in blockbusters such as The Dark Knight.

Shields has worked with the likes of Lloyd Kaufman, Larry Thomas, James Vallo, and Bruce Vilanch. She also does work in television and stage. She also stars in several comics produced by Comic Book Divas. Shields is also a multi-time featured guest at the annual Days of the Dead convention, the Wheaton All Night conventions and Days of Terror, as well as many others.

She was recently cast as the lead in the feature film Llorona and a featured role in the remake of Night of the Living Dead.

== Selected filmography ==
- Voices From the Graves (2006) as Crystal
- Timeserver (2007) as Dot
- Fred Claus (2007)
- The Dark Knight (2008)
- Isle of the Damned (2008)
- Cannibal Island Holocaust (2008) as Pucci
- Working Title (2009)
- Public Enemies (2009)
- Not Another B Movie (2010) as Suzie the PA
- Mountain Mafia (2010) as Lilly
- Special Day (2010)
- Post Mortem, America 2021 (2011) as Suze
- Sister Mary (2011) as Detective Emma Sharp
- Chasing Hollywood (2011)
- Exile (2011) as Professor Loomis
- Illusion (2011)
- Frankenstein: Day of the Beast (2011) as Elizabeth
- Dark Worlds: Slasher (2012) as Snow White, Slasher, Allison Smith
- Divorced Dudes (2012) as Medina
- Night of the Living Dead (2012)
