= The Day of the Beast (disambiguation) =

The Day of the Beast is a 1995 Spanish film.

The Day of the Beast may also refer to:

- The Day of the Beast (novel), 1922 novel by Zane Grey
- Frankenstein: Day of the Beast, 2011 horror film
