= Byron Thames =

American actor

- Born: April 23, 1969 (age 57); Jackson, Mississippi, U.S.
- Occupations: Actor, musician
- Years active: 1981–present
- Spouses: Lisa Alpert (m. 1993; div. 1995); Tricia Leigh Fisher (m. 2007)
- Children: 2, including Hudson Thames
- Relatives: Eddie Fisher (father-in-law); Connie Stevens (mother-in-law); Carrie Fisher (half-sister-in-law); Todd Fisher (half-brother-in-law); Joely Fisher (sister-in-law)

Byron Thames (born April 23, 1969) is an American television and film actor and musician.

== Early life ==
Born in Jackson, Mississippi, his family moved shortly after his birth to New Orleans, Louisiana. He moved to Hollywood, California, with his mother at age eight to pursue a career as an actor.

== Career ==
After meeting actor/director Michael Landon, Thames was cast in the NBC television network dramatic television series Father Murphy in 1981 at the age of eleven opposite actor and former NFL athlete Merlin Olsen. The series ran for two seasons and ended in 1983. The following year, he was cast in Johnny Dangerously, playing the part of actor Michael Keaton's character as a child, and appeared in a starring role in the Mick Jagger-penned dramatic film Blame It on the Night.

In 1985 he received a starring role in Seven Minutes in Heaven. The film centered on the relationships of three teenage friends, portrayed by Thames, Jennifer Connelly and Maddie Corman. During the 1980s, Thames also made appearances in a number of television series, including: CHiPs, Silver Spoons, 21 Jump Street, Family Ties, Highway To Heaven and Brand New Life.

In 2001, he appeared in Don's Plum as the title character, "Don Plum". In 2004, he co-starred with James Vallo in the independent sci-fi comedy Space Daze which was distributed by Troma Entertainment in 2005 and then reprised his role in the 2009 sequel Spaced Out. In 2007, he teamed up again with Vallo and Space Daze writer/director John Wesley Norton playing the lead role in the then titled Working Title which was later released as Not Another B Movie in 2011 (also distributed by Troma).

Thames provided additional voices in two Blue Sky films Epic and Rio 2, along with Jim Conroy, John Storey, Randy Thom, Jason Harris Katz, Holly Dorff, David Cowgill, and more.

== Personal life ==
Byron Thames married actress Lisa Alpert in 1993. They had one son together, singer and actor Hudson Thames. They divorced in 1995 and he married actress Tricia Leigh Fisher in August 2007. The couple resides in Hollywood, California, with their child, as well as their children from his prior marriage and her previous relationship.

== Filmography ==
=== Film ===
Year	Title	Role	Notes
1983	Heart Like a Wheel	John (age 10-13)	
1984	Blame It on the Night	Job Dalton	
1984	Johnny Dangerously	Young Johnny	
1986	Seven Minutes in Heaven	Jeff Moran	
1989	84C MoPic	MoPic	
2001	Don's Plum	Don	
2003	Without Rhyme or Reason	John	
2005	Space Daze	Bartender	
2006	Spaced Out	Mike Cosim	
2007	Boxboarders!	Chainsaw Officer #1	
2009	Saving Grace B. Jones	Clint Dexter	
2010	Not Another B Movie	Bryon	
2011	From Up on Poppy Hill	Additional voices	
2012	Chronicle	Howard	
2013	Epic	Additional voices	
2013	The Wind Rises	Additional voices	
2014	Rio 2	Additional voices	
2014	Hacks	Byron	
2016	Ice Age: Collision Course	Additional voices	
2018	Next Gen	Additional voices	
2022	Mind Wiped	Mike Colsim	

=== Television ===
Year	Title	Role	Notes
1981–1983	Father Murphy	Matt Sims	31 episodes
1982	CBS Schoolbreak Special	Danny Gordon	Episode: "Just Pals"
1983	CHiPs	Kevin Cody	Episode: "Journey to a Spacecraft"
1983	The Powers of Matthew Star	Ryan Wilson	Episode: "The Great Waldo Shepherd"
1984	Silver Spoons	Randy	3 episodes
1987	21 Jump Street	Dylan Taylor	Episode: "Bad Influence"
1988	Highway to Heaven	Josh Barnett	Episode: "A Mother's Love"
1988	A Father's Homecoming	Eric Birstock	Television film
1988	Vietnam War Story	Mitty	Episode: "The Fragging"
1988	Freddy's Nightmares	Billy	Episode: "Mother's Day"
1989	Family Ties	Josh Wakefield	Episode: "Deja Vu"
1989	Monsters	Paul	Episode: "The Match Game"
1989–1990	Brand New Life	Laird Gibbons	6 episodes
1993	Cooperstown	Young Harry	Television film
1994	Diagnosis: Murder	Charlie	Episode: "Reunion with Murder"
1995	ER	Willy	Episode: "Long Day's Journey"
2001	Star Trek: Enterprise	Crewman	Episode: "Broken Bow"
2008	Californication	Self	Episode: "La Ronde"
2017	Sleepovers	Billy James	Television film
