= Miss Foozie =

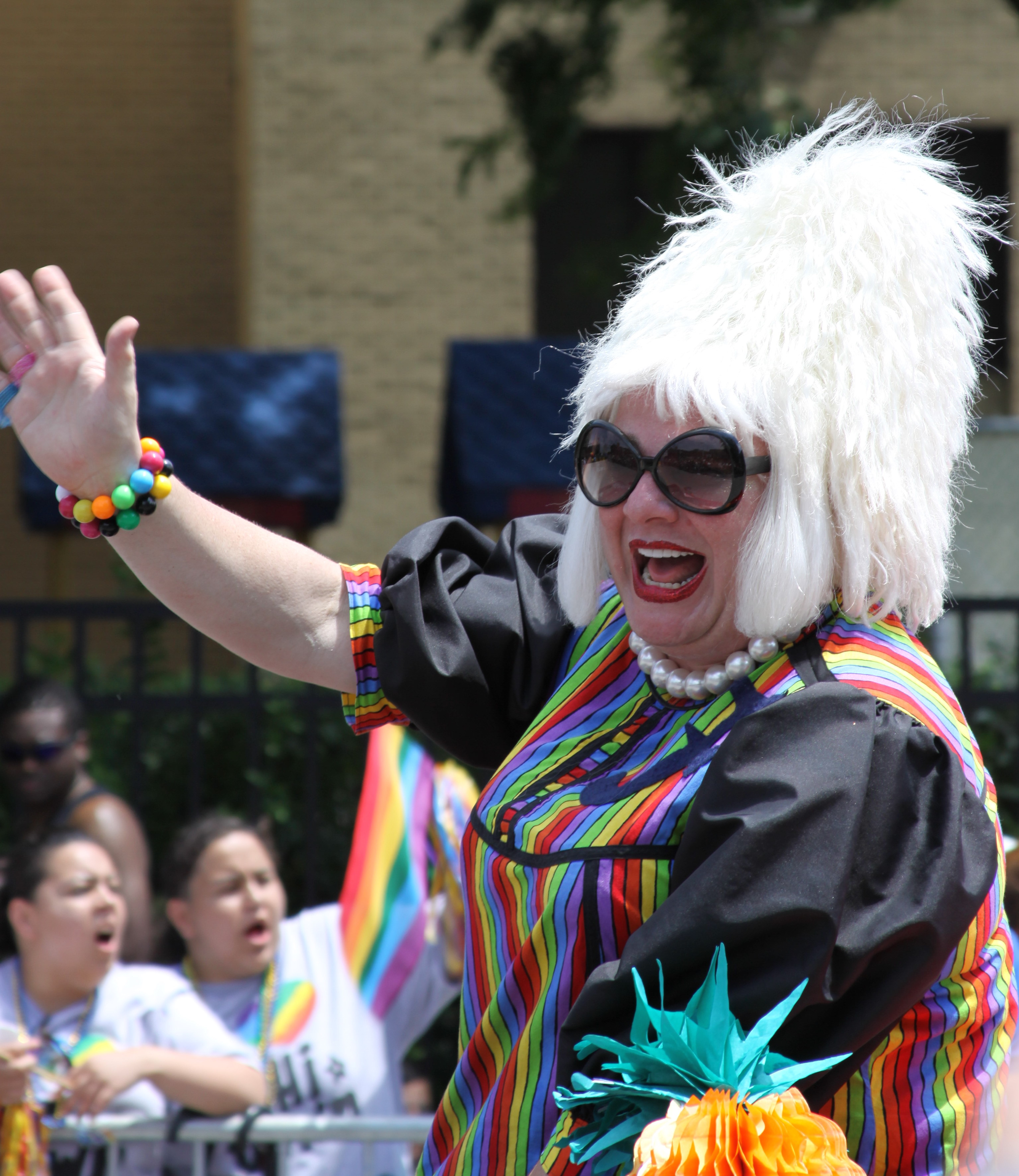
- Miss Foozie rides in the back of a car during the 2010 pride parade in Chicago, Illinois.

In-universe information
- Alias: Lucy Foozie
- Species: Human
- Gender: Female
- Occupation: Personality
- Nationality: American

Lucy Foozie (born April 6, 1960), better known as simply Miss Foozie, is the stage name of John Foos, a character from Chicago. Time Out Chicago calls her a "drag hostess and entertainer", and Chicago Free Press has awarded her "best female impersonator". Since 2008, Miss Foozie has served as Community Ambassador for ChicagoPride.com.

In 1997, Miss Foozie was "born" at her portrayer's 37th birthday party. Since then, her career has included parades, four movies, and live performances throughout the United States.

== Movies and television ==
In 2004, Miss Foozie appeared in Twenty Gay Stereotypes Confirmed, a tongue-in-cheek look at gay stereotypes using the director's childhood home movies. She appears on the streets of Chicago introducing the third stereotype while uttering her catchphrase, "Hello, Pineapples!"

In 2005, Miss Foozie made a special appearance in Bowser Makes a Movie, a comedy about a young man struggling to make a hay adult film. In 2007, Miss Foozie appeared as herself in Father Knows..., an LGBTQ+ themed film involving a father-son relationship, gay romance, and explicit sex. In 2009, Miss Foozie played herself again in Sister Mary, a dark comedy written and directed by Scott Grenke, starring Brent Corrigan, Bruce Vilanch, and producer James Vallo.

On May 25, 2011, Connie de Bie spent "A Night with Miss Foozie" in Chicago with the Windy City celebrity for 1st Look Chicago on Life/Style Television, a division of NBCUniversal, describing, "She's a character artist with a supersized personality and when Miss Foozie enters a room, you'll know it! She's extremely well-known and supportive of Chicago's gay community. Watch as the two paint the town as Miss Foozie gears up for Pride Fest!" The program was broadcast on June 19, 2011 on NBC nationwide after Saturday Night Live.

== Publications ==
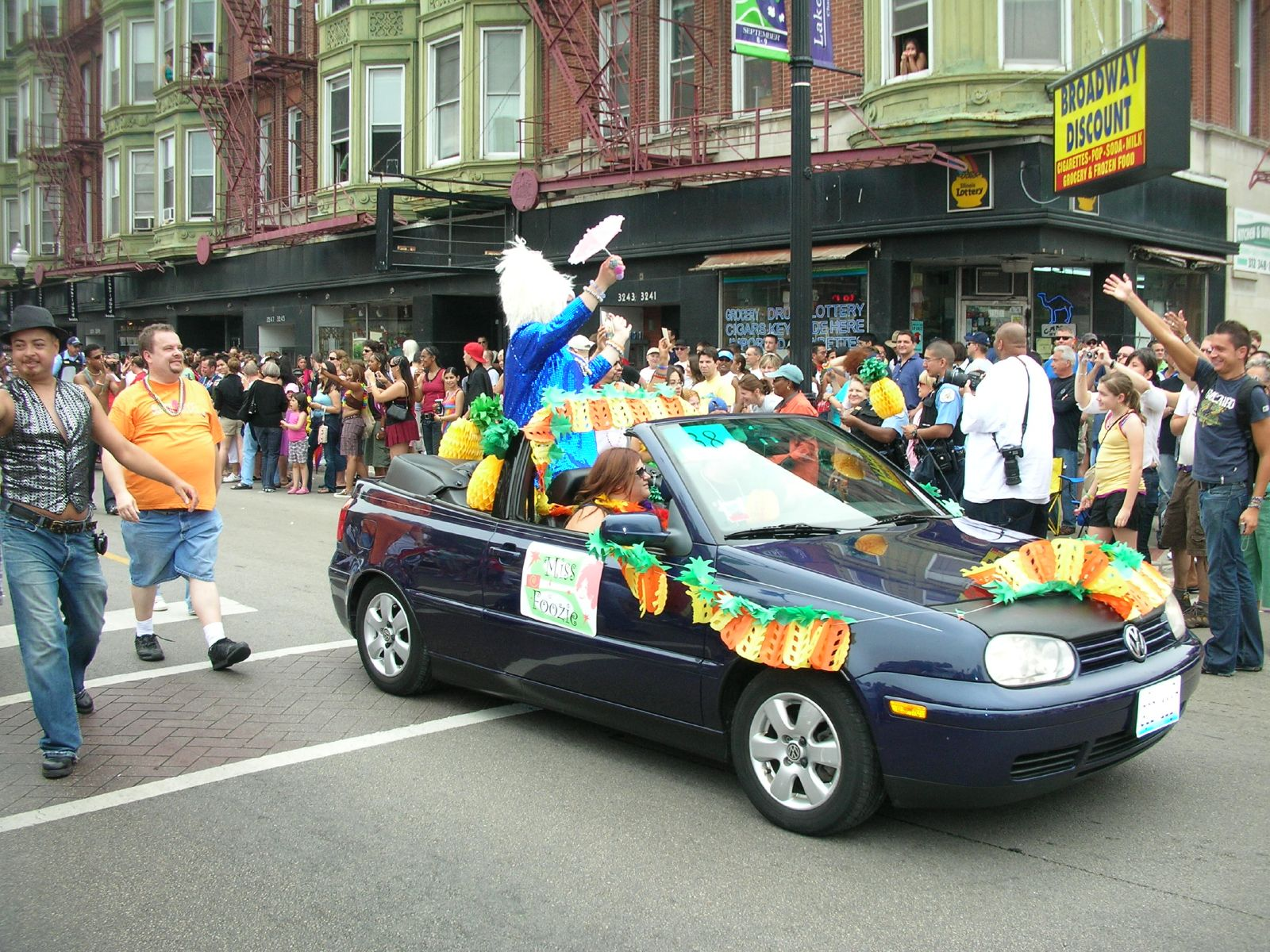
Miss Foozie rides in the back of a car during the 2007 pride parade in Chicago, Illinois.

On March 20, 2002, Miss Foozie appeared on the cover of Nightspots, an extensive, four-color glossy of Chicago's vibrant LGBT nightlife scene, published by Windy City Media Group, which also publishes Windy City Times, the city's oldest gay newspaper. Artwork of her appeared on the cover on May 1, 2005, and she appeared on the cover again in April 2007. In November 2002, she appeared on the cover of BoystownChicago, and she appeared on the cover again in 2005 as "Chicago's Most Loved Host".

For North Halsted Market Days in 2003, Chicago artist Lee Kay created a caricature of her in the window of Boystown adult shop Batteries Not Included. BOI Magazine, a free magazine established in January 2000 distributed in bulk in the Chicago area, featured Kay's photo & artwork on the cover. In June 2004, she appeared on the cover of Chicago magazine Crusin'. In June 2005, she advertised beads in print ad for Gay Mart in Chicago.

In March 2007, she appeared in Time Out Chicago, and her photo ran alongside a question she answered in an article for their October 15–21, 2009 issue titled "Virgin territory"; Jason A. Heidemann asked some of their favorite LGBT Chicagoans to "reveal their first same-sex shag.": "My first time was all about who is the top and who is the bottom. That took five minutes."

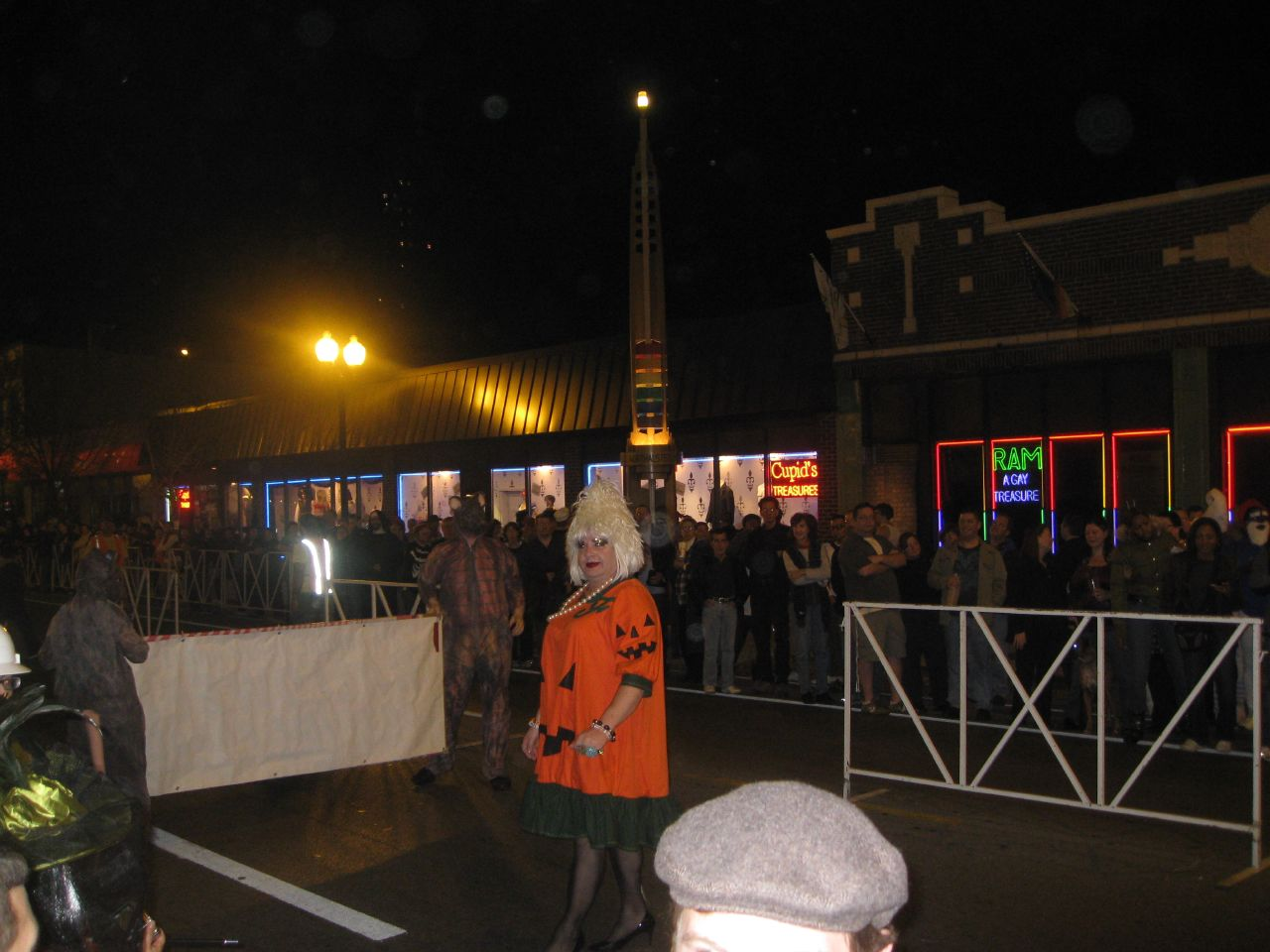
Miss Foozie emcees the 12th Annual Triangle Neighbors' Northalsted Halloween Parade in Boystown in 2008.

She appeared on the cover of Gay Chicago Magazine in April 2007, and again on October 29, 2009 as the Queen of Hearts for her then-upcoming role as hostess and emcee for that year's Halloween parade. Photographer Ashley Allen photographed her front and center with the other characters of Alice's Adventures in Wonderland: Alice, Mad Hatter, March Hare, and Cheshire Cat.

In April 2007, she appeared in a straight periodical, wig and all, for Chicago magazine's special report "Money in Chicago 2007". The section entitled "Who Makes What" featured other Chicagoans from a variety of professions from many walks of life with salaries from $200,000 to $0, where she revealed her own to be $23,500.

In June 2007, she was on the front page of Metromix for that year's pride parade, and she was featured in the "Summer Festivals" gallery in the Chicago section for Market Days that year.

On August 24, 2007, photographer Mia Algotti featured Foozie during North Halsted Market Days. The photo showed her in front of a dunk tank seating a twink in Skyline. Dave Ouano photographed her for the August 2007 cover of Chicago Free Press' Freetime section.

== See also ==
- List of LGBT periodicals
- Newspapers of the Chicago metropolitan area
