= Blame It on the Night =

1984 film

- Theatrical release poster
- Directed by: Gene Taft
- Screenplay by: Len Jenkin
- Story by: Mick Jagger; Gene Taft
- Produced by: Gene Taft
- Starring: Nick Mancuso; Byron Thames; Leslie Ackerman; Richard Bakalyan
- Cinematography: Álex Phillips Jr.
- Edited by: Tony Lombardo
- Music by: Ted Neeley; Tom Scott
- Production company: Delphi II Productions
- Distributed by: Tri-Star Pictures
- Release date: November 2, 1984
- Running time: 85 minutes
- Country: United States
- Language: English

Blame It on the Night is a 1984 American drama film directed by Gene Taft and written by Len Jenkin. The film stars Nick Mancuso, Byron Thames, Leslie Ackerman and Richard Bakalyan. The film was released on November 2, 1984, by Tri-Star Pictures.

== Plot ==
Job Dalton is the illegitimate son of star rocker Chris Dalton. He is attending a military school when he receives the sad news that his mother has died. Chris is on tour when the news of the death of Job's mother reaches him. A bit bored with his life and desiring to gain a relationship with his son, he decides to bring the boy on tour with him. To Job, who has only heard his mother's version of their relationship, and who views the military school as home, and aspires to a military career, his father's life and career are as foreign as life on Mars.

What follows are lessons for both as Chris learns how to set limits, how to talk (and listen to) a teenager; and Job learns how to loosen up and enjoy life. They clash frequently on their way to understanding each other, but the denouement in the desert is moving and leaves the viewer feeling they're on the right track.

== Cast ==
- Nick Mancuso as Chris Dalton
- Byron Thames as Job Dalton
- Leslie Ackerman as Shelly
- Richard Bakalyan as Manzini
- Leeyan Granger as Melanie
- Rex Ludwick as Animal
- Michael Wilding Jr. as Terry
- Dennis Tufano as Leland
- Stephen John Hunter as S.G.
- Gary Chase as Buster
- Merry Clayton as herself
- Billy Preston as himself
- Ollie E. Brown as himself
- Mark J. Goodman as himself
- Melissa Prophet as Charlotte
- Joe Mantell as Attorney
- Sandy Kenyon as Colonel
- Linda Blais as Stewardess
- James Bem Sobieski as Cadet in Barracks
- Ida Martin as Baby Nicholas
- Lily Martin as Baby Nicholas
- Anthony T. Mazzucchi as Mazzucchi
- Shepard Saunders as Bob Ritz
- Robert Michaels as Peter Styne
- Judith Marx as Yvonne
- Marissa Ravelli as Daughter #1
- Wendy Brainard as Daughter #2
- Nina Franciosa as Girl in Audience
- Andrew Lauer as Boy in Audience
- Richard Caruso as Sax Player
- Marla Phillips as Gloria Aaron
- Candy Chase as Cowgirl
- Lee Schaff Guardino as Cowgirl
- Larry Randles as Cowboy
- Greg Gault as Cowboy
- Paul Micale as Policeman
- Heidi Banks as Groupie #1
- Paige Nan Pollack as Groupie #2
- Rhonda Rosen as Waitress
- Hank Robinson as Umpire
- Ralph E. MacEwen as Roadie
- Max Rasmussen as Roadie
- Jim Veneziano as Roadie
- Bradley Lieberman as Cadet
- Erik Troy as Cadet
