= Undermain Theatre =

Theatre in Dallas, Texas, United States

Coordinates: 32.7849°N 96.7776°W

- Interactive map of Undermain Theatre
- Address: 3200 Main Street; Dallas, Texas; United States
- Capacity: 90 seat house
- Designation: Small Professional Theatre

Construction
- Opened: 1984
- Years active: 30

The Undermain Theatre is an 80-seat regional theater, home to the professional theater company, Deep Ellum Theatre Group. It is located in Deep Ellum, Dallas, Texas. Deriving its name from the actual location of the basement space "under Main Street", this ensemble group of theatre artists performs new and experimental works throughout Dallas, New York City and Europe and has become known for producing works by many contemporary writers.

== Undermain Theatre history ==
In fall 1983, Katherine Owens and Raphael Parry arrived in Dallas. Both were interested in presenting new and experimental material with an ensemble company in the Deep Ellum area. They began producing together at Stage Number One's Greenville Avenue Theater, in association with Dallas Actor's Theater, on a triple bill of Action, Killer's Head and Icarus's Mother by Sam Shepard. In early 1984, they found the vacant basement space of the now historical Interstate Forwarding Company building on 3200 Main Street. By spring 1984, they had their first production, Excavations: Killer's Head, Twirler, Waking Up, in the Main Street space.

Excavations was part of a Gallery Walk event and was presented in a promenade style due to the lack of seating in their basement theater space. The show was a series of one-acts that both Owens and Parry directed and performed in. By the end of their first season, they were on their way to building their ensemble. In April 1985, Bruce DuBose joined the cast of Dario Fo's Can't Pay? Won't Pay!, beginning a longtime relationship that eventually took DuBose to the position of executive producer of Undermain Theatre.

By its third season, Dallas critics began to take notice and by the end of the fourth season, in spring 1987, Undermain flew in the playwright John O'Keefe to develop his play, All Night Long. In September that year, Undermain developed a relationship with Jeff Jones while producing Seventy Scenes of Halloween. This friendship led to Undermain's long standing relationships with the playwrights Len Jenkin, Mac Wellman and Eric Ehn and the subsequent productions of Poor Folks Pleasure, Harm's Way, A Murder of Crows and The Red Plays, among other shows, establishing Undermain Theatre's name among the language playwrights in New York City and around the US.

== Timeline ==
- 1984 – Undermain established in the Deep Ellum area of Dallas.
- 1986 – Actor's Equity Association contract signed.
- 1995 – Yugoslavian Republic of Macedonia invited the Undermain to perform Goran Stefanovski's play Sarajevo in commemoration of the fiftieth anniversary of the United Nations. Undermain performed in Roman amphitheaters and on the steps of orthodox cathedrals.
- 2000 – Toured Serbia to perform at the DAH Eater celebration.
- 2000 – Began the production of plays in New York (six to date) including in the original adaptation of Neil Young's Greendale.
- 2002 – Established an archival website in partnership with Texas Humanities which provides on-going production information to theaters and audiences.
- 2008 – Performed Greendale at the Ohio Theatre's Soho Think Tank Ice Factory Festival.
- 2009 – The Dallas Public Library produced Beneath the Surface, an exhibit celebrating 25 years of design at Undermain Theatre.
- 2010 – Completed on restoration of the historic Frank Lloyd Wright audience chairs.
- 2011 – Collaborated with David Rabe on his play, The Black Monk and on Port Twilight with Len Jenkin. The Black Monk was published by Simon and Schuster. Port Twilight was published by Broadway Play Publishing Inc..
- 2013 – Produced the first full theatrical production at the Dallas City Performance Hall with Enda Walsh's Penelope, opening the space to capacity houses.

== Travel ==
In 1995, Undermain Theatre traveled to the Republic of Macedonia to perform Goran Stefanvovski's Sarajevo in commemoration of the 50th anniversary of the United Nations. Undermain also performed at the ancient Roman Theatre at Bittola and at the Ohrid Theater Festival. In 2000, the theater company traveled to New York City for the first time, producing three shows there (Coaticook by Lenora Champagne, Gold into Mud and Swedish Tales of Woe by Erik Ehn) as well as four shows in Dallas. In 2001, the company returned to the Balkans with a new work and performed at the DAH Teatar Anniversary Celebration in Belgrade, Yugoslavia.

== The building ==
The unique building, constructed in 1913 by B.D. Milam and E.C. Connor as the first US Customs warehouse in Dallas, is a six-story, Chicago-style building billed as absolutely fireproof with an exterior that was made with red and ironspot bricks and concrete. Jim and Michelle Herling, the owners of the building in the early 1980s, were patrons of the arts, already housing an art gallery on the first floor of the building, and were willing to allow Owens and Parry to rent the entire basement floor at a very low price. From that, Owens and Parry transformed the warehouse basement into a unique performance space that became the home of Undermain Theatre. In 1989, Undermain Properties bought the building on 3200 Main Street. It was adapted for residential use in 1991 by Graham Greene & RTHL to include 28 residential units, keeping both the theatre and the art galleries in their respective places. The building became a Recorded Texas Historic Landmark in 1991 and was listed in the National Register of Historic Places in 2002. It is also a City of Dallas Landmark.

== The chairs ==
The 90-seat house at Undermain Theatre is also unique. The chairs, designed by Frank Lloyd Wright, were originally housed in the Kalita Humphreys Theater. Obtained by the Undermain from the Dallas Theater Center in 1989, the seating was designed by Taliesin architects, the firm that completed many of Wright's projects after his death in 1959. Its design was based on a variety of ideas promoted by Wright himself and by Paul Baker (Director of the Dallas Theater Center in 1957).

== Awards ==
- 1994: 500 Inc's Ken Bryant Vision Award – "the most significant form of recognition for fostering creativity and innovation in the cultural arts of Dallas".
- 1992 to present: Dallas Morning News and Ft. Worth Star Telegram included Undermain in the "Top Ten Productions of the Season".
- 2005–2006: Margo Veil acclaimed number one of the "Top Ten" in the Dallas Morning News
- 2006–2007: Bruce DuBose critically acclaimed Waiting for a Train received the Dallas Ft. Worth Critics forum award for "Best New Play"
- 2008: Artistic director, Katherine Owens, received the Texas Woman of Distinction Award in the Arts and Culture category of the American Association of University Women
- 2009: Eurydice and Neil Young's Greendale chosen as "Top Ten" productions by the Dallas Morning News
- 2010: Port Twilight and The Black Monk tied for "Number One Production" by the Dallas Morning News. Undermain productions receive six citations from the Dallas Fort Worth Theater Critics Forum Awards for Direction (2), Actor, Ensemble, Design and Touring Production.
- 2010: "Best Theater" and "Best Actor" – DMagazine "Best of Culture"
- 2011: Five citations of excellence from the Dallas Fort Worth Critics Forum: Direction (2), Design (2) and Acting.
- 2012: Two citations of excellence from the Dallas Fort Worth Critics Forum: Direction and Ensemble Cast
- 2013: Three citations of excellence from the Dallas Fort Worth Critics Forum: Acting (2) and Design.

== Notable authors ==
Mac Wellman, Jeffrey M. Jones, John O'Keefe, Erik Ehn, Susan Lori-Parks, Lenora Champagne, Howard Baker, Caryl Churchill, Goran Stefanovski, Octavio Solis, Lynne Alvarez, David Rabe, Connor McPherson, Young Jean Lee, Len Jenkin, Dario Fo, David Ray, Sam Shepard, Samuel Beckett, Eugene O'Neill, Harold Pinter.

== Collaborations ==
- The Dallas Museum of Art – Undermain Reads at the Museum
- The Dallas Foundation – Undermain holds its Undermain Theatre Endowment Fund at the Dallas Foundation
- The Dallas Public Library – The Dallas Public Library houses the Undermain archives
- Nasher Sculpture Center – Undermain Theatre presents at the Nasher Gallery Lab
- Southern Methodist University – Undermain Artistic Director Katherine Owens is a guest seminar lecturer for the theater division of the Meadows School of the Arts
- The City of Dallas Office of Cultural Affairs – With support from the City of Dallas, OCA, Undermain provides free and discounted rehearsal space to performing arts groups.
