= Not Another B Movie =

- Theatrical poster
- Directed by: John Wesley Norton
- Written by: John Wesley Norton
- Produced by: James Vallo; John Wesley Norton; Chuck Kelly
- Starring: David Faustino; Joe Estevez; Edward Asner; Byron Thames; Larry Thomas; James Vallo; Erin Moran; Reggie Bannister; Lindsay Gareth; Robert Z'Dar; Lloyd Kaufman
- Cinematography: John Klein
- Edited by: John Wesley Norton; Chuck Kelly
- Music by: Alan Jones
- Production companies: James Vallo Movies; Visual Creations; West Bridge Entertainment; Broomstick Films
- Distributed by: West Bridge Entertainment; (2008 festival release); Troma Entertainment; (2011 DVD release)
- Release date: November 8, 2011 (Troma DVD release)
- Running time: 87 minutes
- Country: United States
- Language: English
- Budget: $550,000 (est)

Not Another B Movie is a 2010 American satirical film, written and directed by John Wesley Norton, which peers into the processes of making a low-budget horror film. The film stars Byron Thames, Larry Thomas, James Vallo, David Faustino, Joe Estevez, and Ed Asner.

== Synopsis ==
The film revolves around a business meeting at a restaurant between frustrated screenwriter Byron (Byron Thames), hack director Larry (Larry Thomas), and clueless producer James (James Vallo). Byron struggles in vain to stick to his original vision for a film, while Larry and James are intent on altering the script. Aside from their wishing to make money, they also want to create a film that will "make the audience walk out...in a good way!" Their shocking movie is tentatively titled "The Umpire Strikes Back", due to the "created" narrative revolving around a baseball umpire (Reggie Bannister), who goes on a killing spree that includes a rip-off of the iconic black-and-white shower scene from Alfred Hitchcock's Psycho, but with a bat replacing the infamous knife.

The script alterations, as well as the trio's recollections of past ventures, are portrayed in short skits and interspersed scenes with the restaurant setting throughout. Many of these cutaway scenes feature the bickering, and at times outrageously violent, cop duo Hines (David Faustino) and Sterns (Joe Estevez), who are trying to find the killer umpire. Cutaways also feature appearances by Edward Asner as a prospective investor not impressed with James' proposal, Erin Moran as a women's apparel store owner, who is not impressed with James' merchandising plan, Robert Z'Dar as an actor auditioning for the role of the killer, and Lloyd Kaufman as a victim from a previous feature from the trio.

In the restaurant, waitress and struggling actress Holly (Lindsay Gareth), at the urging of her pushy fellow waitress friend Kari (Erin Muir), tries repeatedly to get the trio's attention to cast her in one of their projects. She is finally able to reach Byron after he takes a break at the bar to "get numb". Byron alludes to her that she will not be taken seriously if they put her in one of their movies. Holly, however, is at a breaking point and insists she is willing to take the risk no matter what, but Byron still resists.

The film concludes with Byron deciding to strike out on his own and "do something he's proud of for a change". He gives Holly his card and heads out.

== Cast ==
- Byron Thames as Byron
- Larry Thomas as Larry
- James Vallo as James
- David Faustino as Hines
- Joe Estevez as Sterns
- Lindsay Gareth as Holly
- Ed Asner as Angry Investor
- Reggie Bannister as Umpire
- Lloyd Kaufman as Dick
- Erin Moran as Mrs. Klien
- Dominic Capone as Actor
- Michelle Shields as Suzie the PA
- Robert Z'Dar as Maniac Auditioner
- Babette Bombshell as Babette Bombshell
- Cyn Dulay as Silky Woo
- Matthew S. Harrison as Dale
- Greg Maurer as Frankie
- John Wesley Norton as Joe Date
- Mark Piszczor as Jimmy Jay Ray
- Z.D. Smith as Piss Ant

== Releases ==
The film premiered in 2008 under its original title of Working Title in Woodridge, Illinois, and subsequently screened at the 2009 Naperville Independent Film Festival before being picked up by Troma Entertainment for distribution in July 2011.

=== DVD ===
The film was released in anamorphic widescreen DVD format. Its extras include two featurettes: The first with the cast sharing anecdotes about low-budget filmmaking, and the second sharing footage from the film's original premiere. Also included are the distributor's trailers for other Troma films and two short-length comedy sketches.

== Recognition ==
=== Critical response ===
DVD Verdict praised the film, writing it was "one of the most pleasant surprises I've come across in a long time. No, really." Noting that the film's re-release cover art made the DVD appear as one of the films it was intended to spoof, remarked that the film's being retitled and released under a different title and with the Troma cover was "either unfortunate or hilariously ironic," but offered that despite the audio and video being "mediocre, with hazy, grainy colors and flat sound," the film was "hilariously funny, while also emotionally honest and heartfelt," and that it stood out as one of the best films the reviewer had seen in the realm of films about filmmaking.

Panning the film, Unrated magazine asked "[H]ow the hell did they cast Ed Asner?" The review stated that the film was so bad, it was difficult to watch. Continuing, they argued that the plot was pointless, the humor poor, and the cinematography terrible. They noted that among the product's few positive points was the box-cover artwork and the superb job Troma did with marketing something otherwise valueless. They felt the scenes with David Faustino showed promise, but were importunely and repeatedly interrupted by the plotline returning to the three leads arguing and debating over production and marketing in the restaurant. The one scene the reviewer admits to enjoying was the appearance of Ed Asner holding a knife in a manner reminiscent of Hitchcock's Psycho.

Mondo Digital felt the film was less respectable that others in its genre, though "certainly more star-studded," writing it was "an exercise in random spoofery most notable for its roster of supporting actors: Ed Asner, Robert Z'Dar, Erin Moran, Larry Thomas (the Soup Nazi from Seinfeld), Reggie Bannister, Joe Estevez, and David Faustin]." In noting the plot device of three filmmakers arguing on how best to create and market a film project, wrote that the concept was "all very arbitrary and sometimes amusing".

DVD Talk noted that while the new title of the film might lead viewers to "expect the film to be a lowbrow spoof of B horror," and while it in some parts is so, it actually comes off as "a thoughtful dramatic meditation on the seamier side of exploitation horror production, and the people who are involved in it." They expanded that the dual themes presented in this manner "don't mesh very well, and leave us with two disparate halves that don't work as well as they should." They also noted that genuine humor exists within the film, with "lot of good performances." In their being able to draw from personal experiences, filmmakers Byron Thames, Larry Thomas, and James Vallo were "quite convincing as the cynical filmmakers", and actress Lindsay Gareth was "able to reach emotional levels that are genuinely moving." Even while suggesting the film to readers, they offered that the filmmakers might have been better served to have made a self-aware B movie or a sharp satire into filmmaking, as "mixing them together diluted both, and came up wanting." They concluded that the film tried to do too much, and as a result, while still viewable, did nothing with complete success.

Reviewer 10,000 Bullets made note of many other films having been made about making films, and wrote, "few, if any approach this subject in the way" that did this film, describing it as a celebration of schlocky cinema." They also noted that as it is intended as a film to spoof bad films, it was expected that the actor's performances would be "over the top area and not in a good way." The performances described as easiest to digest were those of David Faustino and Joe Estevez as bumbling cops and their inclusion of "some much-needed comic relief." They concluded that while the film attempted to be what it claimed, "the end result is a underwhelming experience that never fully reaches its potential."

Genre review sites noted both positive and negative traits in general. Some samples conclude, "the acting is good, the movie looks nice, and it has a few chuckle moments, but the concept isn't all that intriguing and the thing feels more like a broke-ass episode of Family Guy the way it jumps to flashbacks and the movie-within-a-movie". Online reviewer Upchuck Undergrind of corazine.com was highly favorable, stating, "it's a VERY well-written film. Given that much of its running time is conversation, a lot of sharp writing chops were necessary to give us characters and dialogue to keep our attention, since this isn't a tits-and-gore affair", but also noting that the title and packaging are "misleading, more likely to draw fans of the dumb, endless parodies rather than the kind of viewer such a thoughtful film requires". Craig McGee of Horrornews.net had this to say: "It isn’t for everyone, but not for the usual reasons – it’s a talky dramatic humorous satire with bits and pieces of a horror movie sprinkled in between via the described scenes of the movie the main characters are discussing over dinner"..."If you loathe character development, intelligent satire, and in-joke movie references, do not watch this flick. But if you don’t mind those things…if you DO wanna cheer for people to make the right choices and win in their lives while enjoying a viciously eloquent satirical skewering of the movie making process, then like me, NOT ANOTHER B MOVIE is exactly what you need."

=== Awards and nominations ===
The film was recipient of award nominations at the 2012 Indie Horror Film Festival in Chicago - film nomination for Best Comedy, nomination of Lindsey Gareth for Best Supporting Actress, and a nomination of David Faustino for Best Supporting Actor.
