= The Original Soupman =

Chain of soup restaurants

Coordinates: 40.765429°N 73.983264°W

- The Original Soupman Logo
- Type: Retail, Foodservice, Catering
- Founded: 1984 (original); 2005 - 259 W 55th St, New York, New York 10019
- Headquarters: Eatontown, New Jersey
- Number of locations: 1
- Area served: United States
- Products: Soups
- Parent: Gallant Brands, Inc.

The Original Soupman is a soup restaurant originally run by Iranian-American soup vendor Ali "Al" Yeganeh (Persian: علي یگانه), modeled after Yeganeh's original restaurant Soup Kitchen International, which was a well-known soup restaurant at 259-A West 55th Street (between Broadway and 8th Avenue), in Midtown Manhattan, New York City. The restaurant was known for its strict rules among its customers.

The 55th Street location, which began operating in 1984, was closed in 2004, with the windows soaped over. Yeganeh kept the lease on the shop while he looked to expand into a broader market. This led to the formation of the Original Soup Man chain and eventually led to the reopening of the Soup Kitchen International location in 2010 under the name "Original Soup Man", like all of Yeganeh's other restaurants.

In 2017, the chief financial officer of The Original Soupman was indicted for income tax evasion, and the chain went into bankruptcy, which led to all of its stores being closed. Later in 2017, The Original Soupman emerged from bankruptcy under new ownership, and it reopened in the original location in late 2018, going by its former name, The Original Soup Kitchen. Although Yeganeh is not involved with the day-to-day operations anymore, he still owns the brand name and is in charge of the soup recipes.

== Original restaurant ==
Soup Kitchen International

In a profile of Yeganeh and Soup Kitchen International published in The New Yorker in 1989, both the small restaurant's popularity and Yeganeh's obsessive focus on his customers' behaviour were noted. Yeganeh was quoted in the article as saying, "I tell you, I hate to work with the public. They treat me like a slave. My philosophy is: The customer is always wrong and I’m always right." Yeganeh explained his strict philosophy about customer behavior by noting that, "Whoever follows [my rules], I treat very well. My regular customers don’t say anything. They are very intelligent and well-educated. They know I’m just trying to move the line." However, the writer noted that customers who stalled or complained would be bypassed, and quoted one person in line as advising others, "Just don’t talk. Do what he says."

== Fame via Seinfeld ==
Yeganeh was the inspiration for the "Soup Nazi" character in the eponymous episode of the NBC television sitcom Seinfeld, which first aired on November 2, 1995. In this episode, Yeganeh, fictionalized as "Yev Kassem", was portrayed as the tyrannical purveyor of his soups, making all of his customers follow a strict set of rules if they wish to successfully procure a bowl of one of his coveted soups. Kassem was portrayed by Larry Thomas, who made two appearances in the series. For the original episode, Thomas was nominated for the Primetime Emmy Award for Outstanding Guest Actor in a Comedy Series in 1996.

According to writer Spike Feresten, Jerry Seinfeld and several members of the production team went to Soup Kitchen International for lunch weeks after "The Soup Nazi" aired, despite Feresten warning Seinfeld that Yeganeh was now well aware of the episode and was not pleased with the attention it had brought him. Upon recognizing Seinfeld, Yeganeh "did a triple take" and then went into a profanity-filled rant about how the show had "ruined" his business, demanding an apology. Seinfeld allegedly gave what Feresten describes as "the most sarcastic apology I've ever seen anyone give", upon which Yeganeh ejected them from the restaurant, shouting "No soup for you!" in the process.

== Franchises ==
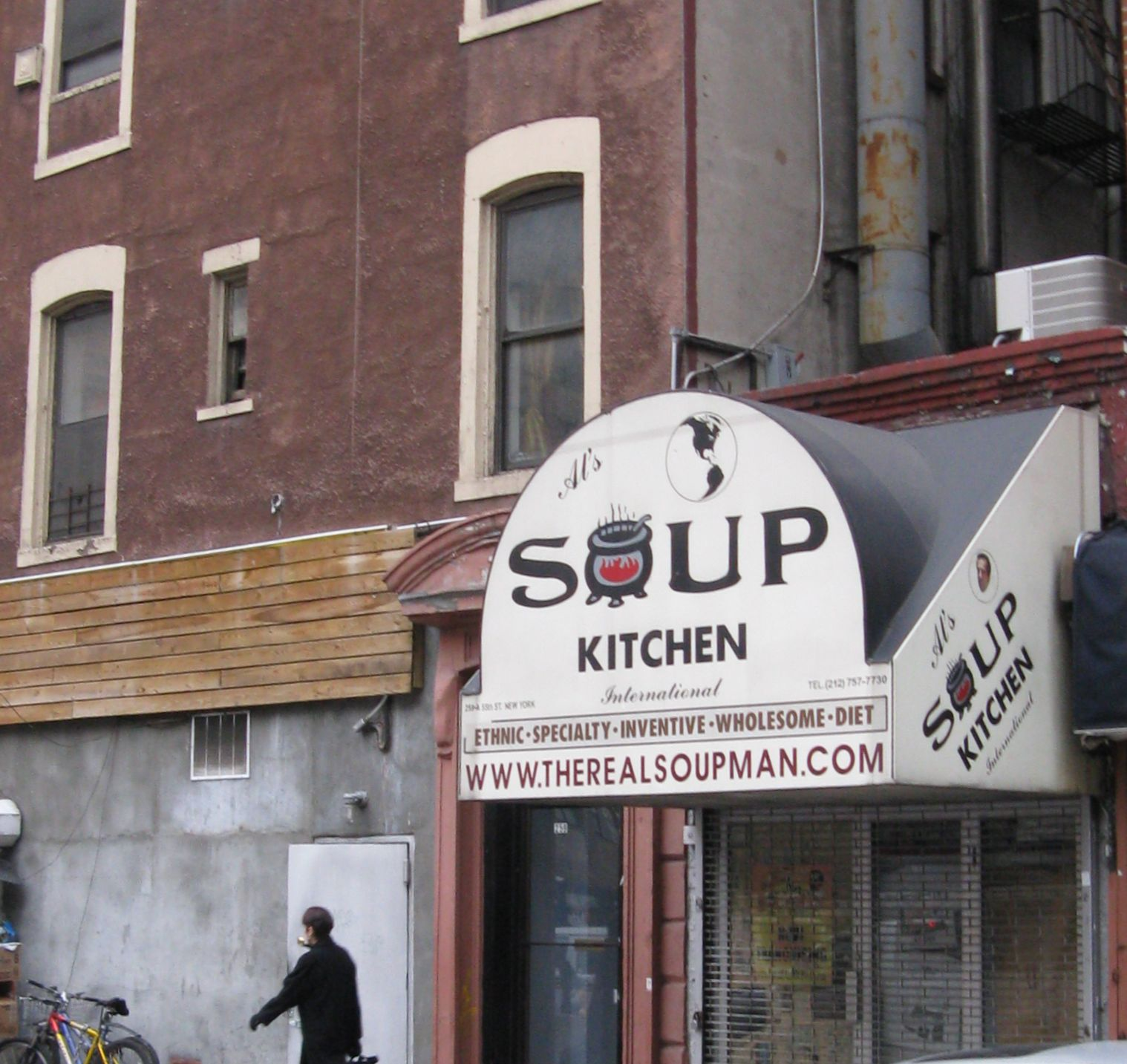
Soup Kitchen International on 55th Street in 2008, after it closed, but with the sign remaining

After reopening, "The Original Soup Man" opened franchises in various cities throughout the United States and Canada, including four in Manhattan. The soups were made in Yeganeh's industrial kitchen in Linden, New Jersey. Yeganeh licensed his recipes, name, and likeness to the company. Franchises were provided with some 45 soup varieties in 8 lb (3.6 kg) bags available in rotation. Chains participating in subfranchising the soups included Ranch One and Cold Stone Creamery. On March 3, 2008, the first Original Soup Man franchise on a college campus was opened in the Russell House University Union at the University of South Carolina. This venue closed near the end of spring 2011.

Reportedly, the strictness popularized by the original location need not necessarily be followed by the franchisees, but Yeganeh banned any Soup Nazi references by franchises and their staff while on the job and has strongly encouraged his franchise owners to avoid references to Seinfeld in their promotions. (However, his marketing contains at least two Seinfeld references, the phrase "Soup for you!" and a mention of the show on the back of his packaged soup offerings.) At the time, Yeganeh accepted media inquiries, but his "media rules" forbade mention of "the 'N' word" (Nazi), personal questions, or follow-up questions. Interviews were conducted only via e-mail.

Despite Yeganeh's contempt for the Soup Nazi character, it was announced on July 22, 2015 that Soupman, Inc. had licensed the image of actor Larry Thomas, who portrayed the "Soup Nazi" character on Seinfeld, to promote Yeganeh's soups across America.

== Grocery store offerings ==
Soup Kitchen International Inc., "The Original Soupman," and Yeganeh announced on April 22, 2005, that a retail line of "heat-n-serve" soups would be available in May at select grocery stores. There were five different variations available, made by SoBe Beverages and supervised by Al Yeganeh. The soups were packaged in 15 oz. ‘Grab-N-Go’ clear packages. Since its launch in May 2005, "The Original Soupman" line of soups has been sold in 14 states and over 7,000 grocery stores across the United States and Canada.

== Bankruptcy and relaunch ==
In May 2017, Robert Bertrand, the chief financial officer of The Original Soupman, was arrested and charged with income tax evasion for failure to pay the company's Medicare, Social Security, and federal income taxes dating back to 2010. Less than two months later, the chain filed for bankruptcy. All of the company's assets, including its licenses from Yeganeh and its license of the image of Larry Thomas, were sold in a bankruptcy sale in September 2017 to a company called Gallant Brands, headed by Joseph Hagan. All of the company's physical locations were closed at that time, most of its major customers were lost, and the company only continued to operate its grocery store sales business.

In April 2018, Bertrand pled guilty and was sentenced to nine months in prison; his defense was that his actions were intended to keep the company afloat. Around that time, The Original Soupman was able to re-enter New York City's public schools lunch program after some modifications to the recipes, then to expand sales to delis and supermarkets in the New York City area, and finally, in December 2018, it opened its first post-bankruptcy physical location in a Times Square kiosk.

== Other popular culture ==
The "Soup Nazi" character in Seinfeld was not the first time that Yeganeh was referenced in film. According to Nora Ephron's DVD commentary, the first pop culture reference to Yeganeh (though not by name) occurs in the 1993 movie Sleepless in Seattle, which Ephron co-wrote and directed. In the film, a magazine writer discusses a potential story: "This man sells the greatest soup you have ever eaten, and he is the meanest man in America. I feel very strongly about this, Becky; it's not just about the soup."
