= Serbu Super-Shorty =

Super-Shorty
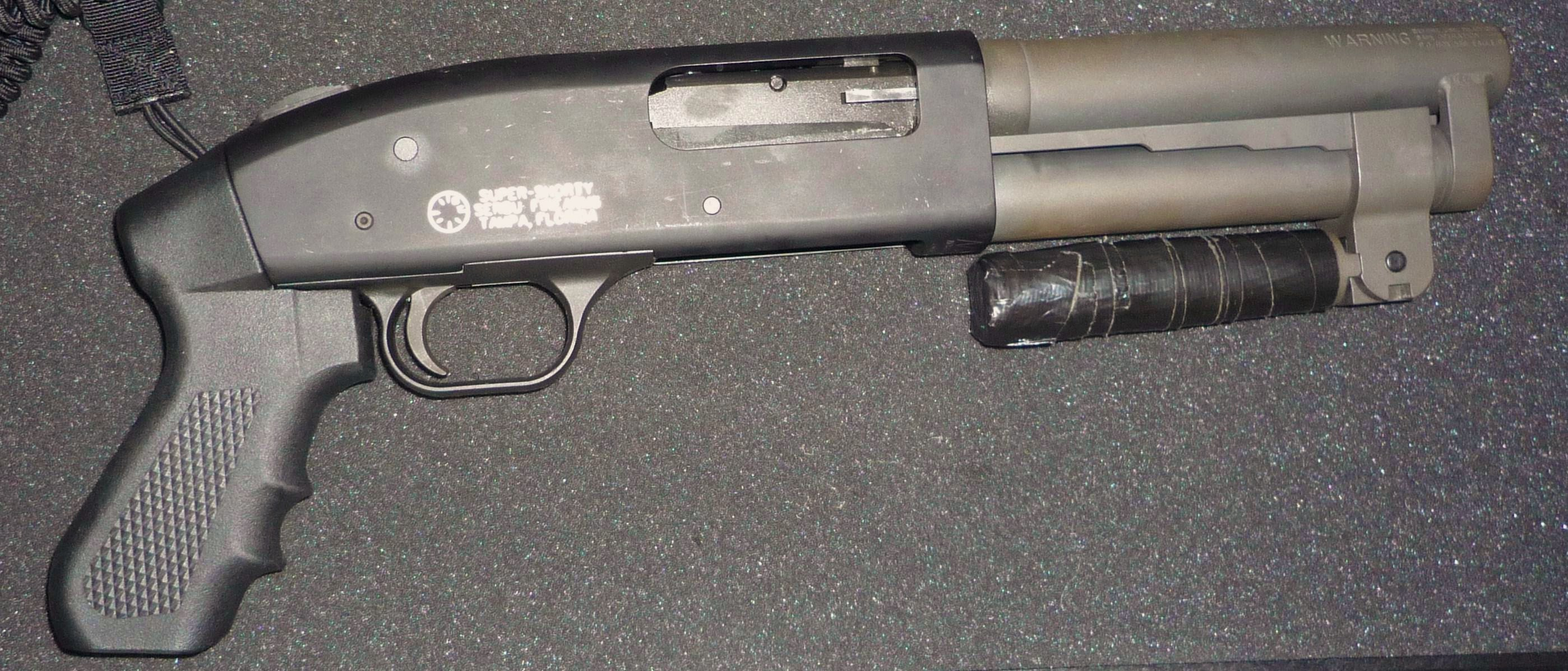
- Type: Short-barrelled shotgun
- Place of origin: United States

Service history
- In service: 1998–present

Production history
- Designer: Mark Serbu
- Designed: 1998
- Manufacturer: Serbu Firearms
- Produced: 1998–2022, 2026–Present

Specifications
- Mass: 1.8 kg (4 lb)
- Length: 419 mm (16.5 in)
- Barrel length: 165 mm (6.5 in)
- Cartridge: 12 (3") and 20 (3") Gauge
- Action: Pump action
- Feed system: 2+1 round tubular magazine
- Sights: None

The Serbu Super-Shorty is a compact, stockless, pump action shotgun chambered in 12-gauge (2 3/4 and 3"). The basic architecture of most of the production models is based on the Mossberg Maverick 88 shotgun, with Mossberg 500 and Remington 870 receivers also available. The shotgun features a spring-loaded, folding foregrip. A 20-gauge model is also available on special order.

== Weapon Classification ==
In the United States, the Super-Shorty is classified as "Any Other Weapon'' (AOW). Civilian ownership transfers of the shotgun previously required a $5 tax stamp, and registration as an AOW to be in compliance with the National Firearms Act until the passage of the One Big Beautiful Bill Act and subsequent lawsuits. As the weapon is originally manufactured without a shoulder stock, it is considered a smooth-bore handgun, and thus an AOW, rather than a short-barrelled shotgun. The Super-Shorty has been sold to various foreign customers, including the King of Jordan, Abdullah II.

Following the abandonment of enforcement of the National Firearms Act against short barreled firearms in October 2026, Super Shorty Shotguns may now be purchased as a regular firearm under federal law with federal registration now being optional for owners who live in states that require it under state law to lawfully possess short barreled shotguns. Mark Serbu announced that Serbu Firearms will still register all new production Super-Shorty Shotguns under the National Firearms Act to accommodate transfers to customers in states that still require NFA registration, but that customers in states that don't require federal registration, may and are encouraged to purchase them as regular firearms.

== History ==
The first Serbu Super-Shorty was made by Mark Serbu for a friend in 1998 and was based on the receiver of a Mossberg 590. It officially became sold by Serbu's company the same year.

=== 2022 Discontinuation ===
Serbu Firearms announced on its social media pages on June 7, 2022 that the Super-Shorty was officially discontinued due to it taking up too many resources from their main product lines for .50 caliber rifles.

=== 2026 Resumption of Production ===
Serbu Firearms announced on its social media pages in August 2025 that production of the Super-Shorty would resume with prospective buyers invited to join a waitlist for the new production guns, but was delayed by the company's relocation. In October 2026, Mark Serbu announced the imminent delivery of the first new batch of Super Shorties by the end of the month, with the initial production batch consisting of approximately 25 firearms.

== Users ==
- United States: Various law enforcement agencies and the US military.

== See also ==
- List of shotguns
- Norinco HP9-1
