= Brand New Life =

- Created by: Chris Carter
- Written by: Chris Carter; Duane Clark; John J. Strauss; Dori Pierson
- Directed by: Eric Laneuville; Steve Robman; Don Weis
- Starring: Barbara Eden; Don Murray; Shawnee Smith; Byron Thames; Jennie Garth; Alison Sweeney; David Tom; Eric Foster
- Theme music composer: Steve Tyrell
- Opening theme: "Brand New Life" performed by Jill Colucci
- Country of origin: United States
- Original language: English
- No. of seasons: 1
- No. of episodes: 6 (including the pilot)

Production
- Executive producer: Chris Carter
- Producers: Eric Laneuville; George W. Perkins
- Running time: 120 minutes (pilot); 60 minutes (per episode)
- Production companies: Walt Disney Television; NBC Productions

Original release
- Network: NBC
- Release: October 1, 1989 – April 15, 1990

Brand New Life is an American comedy-drama television series starring Barbara Eden and Don Murray and produced by Walt Disney Television and NBC Productions that aired on NBC as part of The Magical World of Disney during the 1989–90 television season.

The series originally premiered as a two-hour television movie pilot entitled Brand New Life: The Honeymooners on September 18, 1989, as part of NBC Monday Night at the Movies and its ratings success led to the commissioning of a weekly series. Afterwards, the show's regular timeslot was on Sunday nights on NBC's The Magical World of Disney from October 1, 1989, to April 15, 1990. The series also marked Barbara Eden's first television series since Harper Valley PTA (1981–1982) and is also her third collaboration with Don Murray, having previously starred together in the television films Return of the Rebels (1981) and The Stepford Children (1987).

The theme song "Brand New Life" was written by Steve Tyrell and performed by Jill Colucci.

== Plot ==
Barbara McCray (Barbara Eden) is a struggling divorced mother of three teenagers working part-time as a waitress while studying to become a court reporter, who meets and marries Roger Gibbons (Don Murray), a wealthy attorney and widower with three teenagers of his own. Together, they set up housekeeping in his Bel Air home and stories follow the comedic and dramatic incidents of blending two families with contrasting social backgrounds.

== Cast ==
- Barbara Eden as Mrs. Barbara McCray Gibbons
- Don Murray as Mr. Roger Gibbons, Barbara's 2nd husband
- Shawnee Smith as Amanda Gibbons, Roger's daughter
- Byron Thames as Laird Gibbons, Roger's son
- Jennie Garth as Ericka McCray, Barbara's daughter
- Alison Sweeney as Christy McCray, Barbara's daughter
- David Tom as Bart McCray, Barbara's son
- Eric Foster (movie) as Barlow Gibbons, Roger's son

== Episodes ==
=== TV movie pilot (1989) ===
Title	Directed by	Original release date
Brand New Life: The Honeymooners	Eric Laneuville	September 18, 1989

=== Series 1 (1989–1990) ===
No.	Title	Directed by	Written by	Original release date
1	"Above and Beyond Therapy"	Eric Laneuville	John J. Strauss	October 1, 1989
2	"I Fought the Law"	Steven Robman	Duane B. Clark & Steven Wilde	October 15, 1989
3	"Private School"	Eric Laneuville	Dori Pierson	October 22, 1989
4	"Children of a Legal Mom"	Steve Robman	Chris Carter	January 7, 1990
5	"Even Housekeepers Sing the Blues"	Don Weis	Chris Carter	April 15, 1990
