= Skag =

American drama television series

- Genre: Drama
- Created by: Abby Mann
- Written by: William A. Attaway; Hindi Brooks; Abby Mann; Marsha Norman
- Directed by: Edward Parone; Frank Perry; Allen Reisner
- Starring: Karl Malden; Piper Laurie; Craig Wasson; Peter Gallagher; Leslie Ackerman; Kathryn Holcomb; George Voskovec; Powers Boothe; Frank Campanella; Shirley Stoler
- Composer: Bruce Broughton
- Country of origin: United States
- Original language: English
- No. of seasons: 1
- No. of episodes: 5 (+ Pilot television movie)

Production
- Executive producers: Abby Mann; Lee Rich
- Producers: Douglas Benton; Brad Dexter
- Running time: 60 mins. (approx)
- Production company: Lorimar Television

Original release
- Network: NBC
- Release: January 6 – February 21, 1980

Skag is an American drama series that aired on NBC and starred Karl Malden. Skag originated as a three-hour television movie that aired on January 6, 1980 (as an installment of The Big Event). Over a week later, it then premiered as a weekly series, Thursdays at 10/9c, beginning on January 17, 1980. It ran until its cancellation on February 21, 1980.

Skag focused on the life of a foreman at a Pittsburgh steel mill. Malden described his character, Pete Skagska, as a simple man trying to keep his family together. The series was created by Abby Mann, and executive produced by Mann and Lee Rich.

== Synopsis ==
The opening three-hour movie pilot introduces viewers to 56-year-old Pete "Skag" Skagska (Malden), a hard-working steel mill foreman of Serbian-Orthodox ancestry, who dealt with a lot of fire in both his professional and personal lives. The dark lairs of welding, colossal machinery, and working-class ideals from the people he supervised was the only life Skag knew, until a series of events turned his world upside down. On the homefront, his devoted second wife Jo (Piper Laurie), 12 years his junior and the only Jewish member of the Skagska family, was at times growing distant from Pete; his two eldest sons, David (Craig Wasson) and John (Peter Gallagher) were also growing apart from him, but were feuding with him over their radically different ideals and their respective decisions in life; and most profoundly, his elderly father, Petar Sr. (George Voskovec), who also lived in the household, was suffering from the aftermath of a debilitating stroke. Skag's concern and mental anguish over these issues was about to reach its boiling point just as Skag suddenly suffered a stroke, as well, finding himself incapacitated, emotionally scarred, and unemployed for an untold period of time.

Throughout the rest of the movie and the brief five-episode run of the series, Skag is forced to make some monumental decisions in his life, as he slowly regains his physical abilities and comes to terms with the fact that retirement may come early, due to possible less competence in his line of work. The larger obstacle in Skag's life was perhaps not so much his health or job, but of his disapproval and difficulty understanding the values of a changing world. All his life, Skag was a staunch traditionalist, and viewed modern society with scorn and derision. This ultimately caused the rift between his sons and him; Skag hoped the oldest, David, who worked at the steel mill with him, would carry on the Skagska name and take over the local industry someday. David, unfortunately, felt uncomfortable about his job, due to its high safety risk and his concern about being labeled in the meantime as just a blue-collar on the bottom rung of society. Second-oldest John was in medical school, and was more concerned about making money as a successful doctor than in his family, which also caused many showdowns with Skag. More issues arose from Skag's two teenaged daughters, 18-year-old Barbara (Leslie Ackerman), who was painfully shy and insecure, and 15-year-old Patricia (Kathryn Holcomb), whose struggles with weight clashed with her growing pains and teenaged hormones to the point that she became sexually promiscuous with boys, in a desperate attempt to be popular.

During his rehabilitation period, Skag decided to promote another younger "star worker" at the steel mill, Whalen (Powers Boothe), to take over as foreman; it was evident from the start that Whalen coveted the job on a full-time basis, which both relieved and upset Skag. Since Whalen was hired only as a second choice after son David, Skag, in his old-fashioned ways, believed that a younger person outside the family who ran the operation would deplete the work ethic that Skag and many others had worked hard to maintain for many generations. Skag was able to vent his frustrations to Jo, who at this time, found herself mending bridges with her husband, even if not all was perfect; and with father Petar, who would sit with his equally debilitated son and relate to his sentiments on the changing world and how it made them break down inside.

Paczka (Frank Campanella) was a tenured worker at the steel mill, and Dottie Jessup (Shirley Stoler) a neighbor and friend of the Skagska family.

== Cast ==
- Karl Malden as Pete "Skag" Skagska
- Piper Laurie as Jo Skagska
- Craig Wasson as David Skagska
- Peter Gallagher as John Skagska
- Leslie Ackerman as Barbara Skagska
- Kathryn Holcomb as Patricia Skagska
- George Voskovec as Petar Skagska, Sr.
- Richard Bright as Madman Messisik
- Powers Boothe as Whalen
- Frank Campanella as Paczka
- Shirley Stoler as Dottie Jessup
- Eoin Kerr as Pint Man

== Reception and ratings ==
The series pilot episode earned critical praise and high ratings, but ratings quickly dropped off and NBC canceled the series after five episodes. Skag creator Abby Mann, who worked on the series' first two episodes, blamed uneven directing and artistic interference and unreasonable salary demands from series star Karl Malden for the series' failure.

One leftover episode of Skag remained after the cancellation, and did not air on NBC.

== Episodes ==
No.	Title	Directed by	Written by	Original release date
0	"Pilot"	Frank Perry	Abby Mann	January 6, 1980
1	"In Trouble at 15"	Edward Parone	Story by : Hindi Brooks; Teleplay by : Marsha Norman	January 17, 1980
2	"The Wildcatters"	Virgil W. Vogel	William A. Attaway & Abby Mann	January 24, 1980
3	"The Wildcatters"	Virgil W. Vogel	William A. Attaway & Abby Mann	January 24, 1980
4	"The Working Girl: Part 1"	Allen Reisner	William A. Attaway	January 31, 1980
5	"The Working Girl: Part 2"	Allen Reisner	William A. Attaway	February 7, 1980
6	"What Passes For Love in East Pittsburgh"	Bruce Bilson	Ivy Schultz	February 21, 1980

== Award nominations ==
Year	Award	Result	Category	Recipient
1980	Emmy Award	Nominated	Outstanding Achievement in Film Editing for a Series	Larry Strong (For episode "The Working Girl (Part 1)"

== Bilbliography ==
- Alex McNeil, Total Television. New York City: Penguin Books, 1984 ed.
- Tim Brooks and Earle Marsh, The Complete Directory to Prime Time Network and Cable TV Shows 1946–Present, Ninth edition (New York: Ballantine Books, 2007) ISBN 978-0-345-49773-4
