= Leslie Ackerman =

American actress

- Born: New Jersey, U.S.
- Occupation: Actress
- Years active: 1974–2000
- Spouse: Jeff Altman (m. 1979; div. ??)
- Children: 1

Leslie Ackerman is an American actress.

== Early life ==
Ackerman is from Springfield, New Jersey. Her father progressed from being an attorney to serving on the Federal District Court in Trenton, New Jersey. She became interested in the theater as a child.

== Acting career ==
Ackerman had the role of Abigail in the Broadway production Mourning Pictures (1974). In 1980, she portrayed Barbara Skagska in the NBC drama Skag. Her role in the 1979 television film Women at West Point required her to undergo some aspects of military training. During her three weeks at the United States Military Academy, her activities included attacking the obstacle course, marching in full-combat gear, and running 100 yards while she carried a man on her shoulders.

She is well known to Star Trek fans for her role as the waitress in the Star Trek: Deep Space Nine 1996 episode "Trials and Tribble-ations".

She has guest starred in many television shows, such as Barnaby Jones, The Streets of San Francisco, All in the Family, Welcome Back, Kotter, The Incredible Hulk, Quincy, CHiPs, Cagney & Lacey, Simon & Simon, Moonlighting and Baywatch.

In 2000, she wrote, produced and starred in the movie What's Eating You?.

== Personal life ==
In 1979, Ackerman married Jeff Altman. Before divorcing, they had one daughter.

== Motion pictures ==
- Law and Disorder (1974)
- The First Nudie Musical (1976)
- Joyride to Nowhere (1977)
- Cracking Up (1977)
- Hardcore (1979)
- Blame It on the Night (1984)
- What's Eating You? (2000)
