= Maddie Corman =

American actress

- Born: Madeleine Cornman; August 15, 1970 (age 56); New York City, U.S.
- Occupation: Actress
- Years active: 1985–present
- Spouses: Roger M. Dickes (m. 1992; div. 1997) Jace Alexander (m. 1998)
- Children: 3
- Relatives: Jane Alexander (mother-in-law); Edwin Sherin (stepfather-in-law)

Maddie Corman (born Madeleine Cornman; August 15, 1970) is an American actress. She has appeared in over 25 films, including Seven Minutes in Heaven, Some Kind of Wonderful, The Adventures of Ford Fairlane and A Beautiful Day in the Neighborhood.

== Early life ==
Corman was born Madeleine Cornman in Manhattan, New York.

== Career ==
She began her career as a child actress in the 1980s, at the age of 14. Corman's first television appearance was in the 1985 ABC Afterschool Special episode "I Want to Go Home", where she co-starred with John Getz, Seth Green and Marge Redmond.

That same year, she was cast in the Linda Feferman-directed teen comedy-drama motion picture Seven Minutes in Heaven. Corman starred opposite actress Jennifer Connelly as Polly Franklin, Connelly's character's intervening and overzealous best friend who is in love with a Major League Baseball player named Zoo Knudsen (Billy Wirth).

In 1987, Corman appeared in the John Hughes penned film Some Kind of Wonderful as Laura, the little sister of Keith Nelson, played by Eric Stoltz.

Her follow-up film was the 1990 Renny Harlin-directed comedy The Adventures of Ford Fairlane opposite Andrew "Dice" Clay, Priscilla Presley, Wayne Newton, Lauren Holly and Gilbert Gottfried.

Throughout the 1990s and 2000s, Corman frequently appeared on numerous popular American television series. She made several appearances as various characters on the television drama Law & Order and the HBO comedy Tracey Takes On... opposite comedian Tracey Ullman. She had a recurring role as Ruthie on the ABC comedy series All-American Girl (1994–1995) starring Margaret Cho. She also appeared in small roles in such films as Swingers (1996), Mickey Blue Eyes (1999), and Maid in Manhattan (2002).

In 2019, she starred in the Off-Broadway play Accidentally Brave, an autobiographical play about her husband Jace Alexander being charged with and convicted of possessing and sharing child pornography.

== Personal life ==
Corman was married to Roger M. Dickes from 1992 to 1997.

Corman married director Jace Alexander on September 6, 1998, in Carmel, New York. They have three children. The couple formerly lived in Dobbs Ferry, New York, but moved shortly after Alexander pleaded guilty to possessing and sharing child pornography.

== Filmography ==
=== Film ===
Year	Title	Role	Notes
1985	Seven Minutes in Heaven	Polly Franklin	
1987	Some Kind of Wonderful	Laura Nelson	
1990	The Adventures of Ford Fairlane	Zuzu Petals	
1992	My New Gun	Myra	
1994	PCU	Womynist #2	
1996	Mr. Wrong	Missy	
1996	Swingers	Peek-a-boo Girl	
1996	Boys	Liz Curry	
1997	I Think I Do	Beth	
1999	Mickey Blue Eyes	Carol	
2002	Maid in Manhattan	Leezette	
2006	The Treatment	Patty McPherson	
2006	Ira & Abby	Lea	
2006	Artie Lange's Beer League	Marilyn	
2007	The Savages	Annie	
2008	Phoebe in Wonderland	1st Teacher / White Rabbit	
2009	Adam	Robin	
2011	Peace, Love & Misunderstanding	Carole	
2011	A Novel Romance	Alexandra Dumar	
2012	What Maisie Knew	Ms. Fairchild-Tetenbaum	
2013	Begin Again	Phillis	
2014	Lullaby	Beth	
2015	Naomi and Ely's No Kiss List	Ginny	
2016	Tallulah	Vera	
2017	Wonder Wheel	Psychiatrist	
2018	Private Life	Liz	
2018	Write When You Get Work	Toni Peterkin	
2019	A Beautiful Day in the Neighborhood	Betty Aberlin / Lady Aberlin	
2023	Accidentally Brave	Maddie	

=== Television ===
Year	Title	Role	Notes
1985	ABC Afterschool Special	Mary Sanders	"I Want to Go Home"
1987–88	Mr. President	Cynthia Tresch	Main role
1988	Kate & Allie	Haven Claven	"Allie Doesn't Live Here Anymore", "The Odd Couples"
1990	Extreme Close-Up	Janine	TV film
1991	Mathnet	Babs Bengal	"The Case of the Unnatural"
1991	Square One Television	Babs Bengal	Recurring role
1993	Silk Stalkings	Christie	"Kid Stuff"
1993	Tracey Ullman Takes on New York	Sheila Rosenthal	TV film
1993	Frasier	Gail	"Death Becomes Him"
1994	Diagnosis: Murder	Charlene Baylor	"The Plague"
1994–95	All-American Girl	Ruthie Latham	Supporting cast member
1996	Pacific Blue	Mary Lou	"Cranked Up"
1998	Tracey Takes On...	Sheila Rosenthal	"Loss"
1998	House Rules	Connie	"Dude Act Like a Lady"
1999	Law & Order	Melissa Slater	"Admissions"
2001	Jenifer	Julianne Hoffenberg	TV film
2002	Law & Order: Criminal Intent	Marjorie Whilden	"Tomorrow"
2003	Queens Supreme	Helen Katz	"The Voodoo That You Do"
2003	Law & Order	Andee Mae Haley	"Identity"
2005	Law & Order	Elaine Bowman	"Criminal Law"
2009	Law & Order: Special Victims Unit	Terri Dunne	"Users"
2009	Last of the Ninth	Lois Dobrowski	TV film
2010	Damages	Janine Thurber	"Flight's at 11:08"
2011	Eden	Sarah	"Pilot"
2012	Smash	Rene Walters	"Pilot", "The Callback"
2013	The Good Wife	Leslie Munn	"Everything Is Ending"
2013	Trooper	Ilene Katz-Klausner	TV film
2014	The Carrie Diaries	Miss Meade	"Under Pressure"
2014	And, We're Out of Time	Sophie	TV film
2015	Almost There	Sophie	"Pilot"
2015	Person of Interest	Leslie Thompson	"M.I.A."
2015	Nurse Jackie		"Managed Care"
2016	Unforgettable	Gwen Allen	"We Can Be Heroes"
2016	Girls	Kathy	"Queen for Two Days"
2016	Odd Mom Out	Hollis	"Crushed"
2016	Divorce	Carla Menotti	"Next Day", "Gustav"
2016–17	Younger	Julia	"A Kiss Is Just a Kiss", "A Novel Marriage"
2017	When We Rise	Phyllis Lyon	TV miniseries
2021	Law & Order: Special Victims Unit	Laura Evans	"Never Turn Your Back on Them"
2022	The Marvelous Mrs. Maisel	Nancy	"Everything is Bellmore"
