= Frankenstein: Day of the Beast =

- Theatrical release poster
- Directed by: Ricardo Islas
- Screenplay by: Ricardo Islas
- Based on: Frankenstein by Mary Shelley
- Produced by: Mark Harris; Ricardo Islas; John Marinopoulos; Andrew C. Mathews; Linda Mensch; John Vitiritti
- Starring: Michelle Shields; Adam Stephenson; Tim Krueger
- Cinematography: Ricardo Islas
- Edited by: Ricardo Islas
- Music by: Alexander Scriabin
- Production companies: Alpha Studios; Thespis
- Distributed by: Alpha Studios
- Release date: November 27, 2011
- Country: United States
- Language: English

Frankenstein: Day of the Beast is a 2011 independent horror film directed by Ricardo Islas, loosely based on the 1818 novel Frankenstein; or, The Modern Prometheus by Mary Shelley. It premiered with a limited theatrical release in the United States on November 27, 2011.

== Plot ==
The film takes place on an undisclosed island on a foggy, winter day. Victor Frankenstein and his bride, Elizabeth, are set to be married by a priest who is rowed in on a small raft. But all is not well on the day of these young lovers’ wedding: The ceremony is clearly being conducted in secret, and Victor and Elizabeth are under the protection of seven well-armed mercenaries. All parties soon find themselves being stalked by a seemingly supernatural enemy of great physical strength that dwells in the woods surrounding the small chapel...a monster who kills with swiftness and purpose. As the slaughter escalates and the characters begin to die one by one at the hands of this mysterious Creature, Victor is forced to confess the unholy crimes he committed that has placed himself and the others in this deadly predicament. Meanwhile, as each character faces certain death, the beast’s ultimate target reveals itself not to be Victor, but his bride.

== Cast ==
- Michelle Shields as Elizabeth Frankenstein
- Adam Stephenson as Victor Frankenstein
- Tim Krueger as The Monster
- Paul Barile as Mr. Rowley
- Jay Disney as Henry
- Suzy Brack as Justine
- Wesley Saint Louis as Bartul
- John Vitiritti as Schiffer

== Production and release ==
Production began in the Orland Park, Illinois area in January 2011 and was funded by indie fundraising website IndieGoGo. Principal photography ended in August of the same year. The official world premiere for the movie was held at The Portage Theater in Chicago on Sunday, November 27, 2011. It is currently seeking additional distribution.

== Reception ==
Responses from the premiere have been positive, with reviews praising the film primarily for its homages to horror films produced by Hammer Studios. Patrick McDonald of Hollywoodchicago.com awarded the film 3 stars out of 5: "It has all the familiar Frankenstein monster elements, but also delivers a certain style and authority that allows it to make its own mark. The acting, setting, costumes and dialogue screams drive-in movie fare, but the production gamely reaches out to retell the myth with a little sex, a lot of gore and an interesting take on the reanimation portion of the monster." John Collins of Weirdreview.com also recommends the film primarily for its nostalgic qualities, and he adds, "This is easily the most viscious [sic], evil Frankenstein’s monster I have ever encountered." Ain't It Cool News writes, "Its diversions from [the original] story made me look past the rough edges that go along with low budget and amateur acting. ... I applaud the filmmaker’s derivations from the source material".

== See also ==
- Frankenstein Day
