= Sister Mary (film) =

- Directed by: Scott Grenke
- Written by: Scott Grenke
- Produced by: Scott Grenke; Z.D. Smith; James Vallo
- Starring: Ant; James Vallo; Bruce Vilanch; Judy Tenuta; Shawn Quinlan; Sean Paul Lockhart
- Cinematography: Mitch Logan
- Edited by: Scott Grenke
- Music by: Scott Gilman
- Production company: Knee Deep Films
- Distributed by: West Bridge Entertainment
- Release date: July 16, 2011 (United States)
- Running time: 99 minutes
- Country: United States
- Language: English

Sister Mary is a 2011 American musical comedy film directed and written by Scott Grenke and starring Ant, James Vallo, Bruce Vilanch, Judy Tenuta, Sean Paul Lockhart and Shawn Quinlan.

== Plot ==
Homophobic detective Mark Rima must "partner" up with flamboyant gay detective Chris Riant to stop a serial-killing nun from killing five members of a band called The Ex Choir Boys. When it is determined that the detectives cannot solve the case on their own, expert FBI profiler Agent Peccant is assigned to the case. As the details of the case slowly emerge the police determine that the "nun" may only be a silent witness to the grisly murders. The task force then turns its attention on the Catholic Church and a suspect group of priests with a propensity for "cleansing the souls" of innocent young choir boys.

== Cast ==
- Ant as Agent Peccant
- James Vallo as Mark Rima
- Bruce Vilanch as Farmer Jake
- Judy Tenuta as Older Nun
- Sean Paul Lockhart as Chad
- Shawn Quinlan as Chris Riant
- Matthew Feeney as Chief Homer Bathos
- Anthony Fagiano as Joel Davidson
- James Pusztay as Father O'Bleary
- Miss Foozie as herself
- Z.D. Smith as Ray
- Suzy Brack as Tranny McTrannerson
- Michelle Shields as Detective Emma Sharp
- Eddie Huchro as Father Perdu
- Erin Muir as Elecktra Le Strange

== Production ==
The film is produced by Knee Deep Films, company headed by James Vallo. The film was shot in Chicago, Illinois.

== Reception ==
Chris Carpenter said, "Scott Grenke has a lot for which to atone. The movie isn't so much anti-Catholic as it is criminally unfunny".

=== Awards and nominations ===
Year	Award	Nominee	Category	Result
2012	Laugh or Die Comedy Fest			
2012	Laugh or Die Comedy Fest	Sister Mary	Best Comedy	Nominated
2012	Laugh or Die Comedy Fest	Judy Tenuta	Best Actress	Nominated
2012	Laugh or Die Comedy Fest	Scott Grenke	Director Choice Award	Won
2012	Laugh or Die Comedy Fest	Sister Mary	Special Recognition Award	Won

== Soundtrack ==
1. "Knights of the Altar" — Bob Rysavy, Brandon McCauley and Anthony Fischer
2. "Sacrements" — Anthony Fischer, Brandon McCauley and Bob Rysavy
3. "Blessed" — Brandon McCauley, Bob Rysavy and Anthony Fischer
4. "Pillars" — Bob Rysavy, Anthony Fischer and Brandon McCauley
5. "Falling" — Anthony Fischer, Brandon McCauley and Bob Rysavy
6. "Disposable" — Brandon McCauley, Bob Rysavy and Anthony Fischer
7. "Nothing Yet" — Tim Feeney
