= Seven Minutes in Heaven (film) =

1986 film by Linda Feferman

- Theatrical release poster
- Directed by: Linda Feferman
- Written by: Jane Bernstein; Linda Feferman
- Produced by: Fred Roos
- Starring: Jennifer Connelly; Byron Thames; Maddie Corman; Michael Zaslow; Polly Draper; Alan Boyce; Billy Wirth
- Cinematography: Steven Fierberg
- Edited by: Marc Laub
- Music by: Robert Kraft
- Production companies: Zoetrope Studios; FR Productions
- Distributed by: Warner Bros. Pictures
- Release dates: January 1986 (Sundance); May 9, 1986 (U.S.)
- Running time: 88 minutes
- Country: United States
- Language: English

Seven Minutes in Heaven is a 1986 American teen comedy drama film co-written and directed by Linda Feferman (in her only full-length directorial film). It stars Jennifer Connelly, Byron Thames, and Maddie Corman as three teenage friends in Ohio coping with life and love. The film was shot in 1984 but did not get a theatrical release until May 9, 1986. It later began appearing on cable TV, where it acquired a following. At the 1986 Sundance Film Festival where it premiered, it received a special merit for outstanding achievement.

== Plot ==
Three teenage friends live in Ohio—high school sophomores Natalie, Jeff, and Polly. Jeff has trouble getting along with his stepfather Gerry. After an argument, he storms out of the house and goes to Natalie's house. Natalie, whose mother is deceased, agrees to let Jeff stay at her house for a few days while her father is away on business.

Natalie and Jeff's friend Polly is upset that her crush, James Casey, is pursuing Natalie and not her. But she later meets professional baseball player and underwear model Zoo Knudsen. They meet and talk and, while trying to avoid an obsessive fan of Zoo, take cover in a lingerie store. Posing as an engaged couple, Zoo buys Polly a négligée. Later that night, they make out in his car. Zoo asks her her age and she says she is 18. Before driving off, Zoo tells Polly to come to New York City and watch one of his games. Polly later writes Zoo a fan letter and puts the négligée under her pillow.

Jeff's mother talks to his football coach and convinces him to kick Jeff off the team as punishment for leaving home. She also later runs into Jeff and tries to convince him to come home, but he refuses.

Natalie and Casey begin to spend more time together. One evening, Polly goes over to Natalie's house. She finds Jeff sitting outside in a sleeping bag, to give Natalie and Casey some privacy. Polly then leaves, incorrectly assuming that Natalie and Casey are having sex. Later, Polly hears back from Zoo by mail and receives a signed photo, but is disappointed to find that the letter is a typed, generic fan-response letter.

Frustrated over Zoo, and jealous of Natalie's relationship with Casey (and believing Natalie is no longer a virgin), Polly gets into a fight with Natalie. Natalie storms out of Polly's house. Polly then tries to seduce Jeff, to lose her virginity and become sexually experienced before she meets Zoo again. They start to get intimate, but Jeff walks out when Polly talks about Zoo.

During a school fire drill, Polly shouts out to Jeff, within hearing distance of Natalie, that Casey is flirting with their classmate Lisa. Casey then confesses he never stopped seeing Lisa. Natalie, heartbroken, tells Casey to leave her alone. She later lashes out at Jeff, who is friends with Casey, crushed that he didn't tell her that Casey and Lisa were still together.

Natalie wins a writing competition and goes to Washington D.C. She meets the vice-president, one of her state's senators, and Williams, a White House aide. Williams takes Natalie sightseeing and tries to kiss her, but she avoids the gesture. He asks her to go back to his place, but Natalie declines and suggest they visit the Washington Monument.

Polly goes to New York to watch Zoo play. She causes a commotion when she climbs onto the dugout and pulls out the négligée (and later loses it) to get Zoo's attention. While she's detained by police, Bill, a professional photographer, intervenes, pretending to know her in order to keep her from getting in trouble. Bill lets her stay at his apartment for the night (she unsuccessfully tries to seduce him) and agrees to drive her to the airport the next morning.

Natalie's father arrives home, discovering Jeff has been living with Natalie. Natalie and Polly run into each other at the airport and reconcile. Natalie's father calls Jeff's mother, who arrives and demands that Jeff come home. Natalie comes home and is confronted by her father and Jeff's mother. Natalie apologizes to her father, but expresses her dislike of his being away from home so often. He apologizes too.

Jeff and his mother talk on Natalie's porch. Jeff says he is thinking about moving to California to be with his dad, but his mother reminds him his father doesn't even have a home or job. Jeff reminds her that Gerry isn't his father, but she replies that Gerry's the only father he'll ever really have.

Sometime later, Jeff is outside his house playing basketball with Gerry. Natalie and Polly come by on roller skates and pull Jeff away. The three friends make their way down the street, smiling and holding hands.

== Cast ==
- Jennifer Connelly as Natalie
- Byron Thames as Jeff
- Maddie Corman as Polly
- Michael Zaslow as Natalie's Father
- Polly Draper as Jeff's Mother
- Alan Boyce as Casey
- Billy Wirth as "Zoo" Knudsen
- Terry Kinney as Bill, The Photographer
- Spalding Gray as Dr. Rodney
- Marshall Bell as Gerry, Jeff's Stepfather
- Michael Higgins as Senator Peterson
- Lauren Holly as Lisa (film debut)

== Production ==
Some scenes were filmed in and around Montclair High School in Montclair, New Jersey, and Mamaroneck High School in Mamaroneck, New York. Interior school scenes were filmed inside Nutley High School in Nutley, New Jersey.

== Critical reception ==
In a retrospective review, critic Adrian Martin gave the film 3.5/5 stars, writing "Seven Minutes in Heaven is one of many modest 1980s gems that reminds us of a brief flowering in genre-driven creativity neither mainstream nor indie – and that gave opportunities to many women to make what has turned out to be their only feature films." He added, "Nothing more momentous than a bit of kissing ever happens – and the film delivers nothing more cathartic than a smile and a group-skate. But, like many unfairly forgotten films of its type, Seven Minutes in Heaven is at every moment charming, witty and playful."

== Home media ==
Seven Minutes In Heaven was released on DVD on July 7, 2010.
