= Serbu Firearms =

American firearms manufacturer

- Company type: Firearms Manufacturer
- Founded: 1995
- Founder: Mark Serbu
- Headquarters: Tampa, Florida
- Owner: Mark Serbu
- Website: http://www.serbu.com/

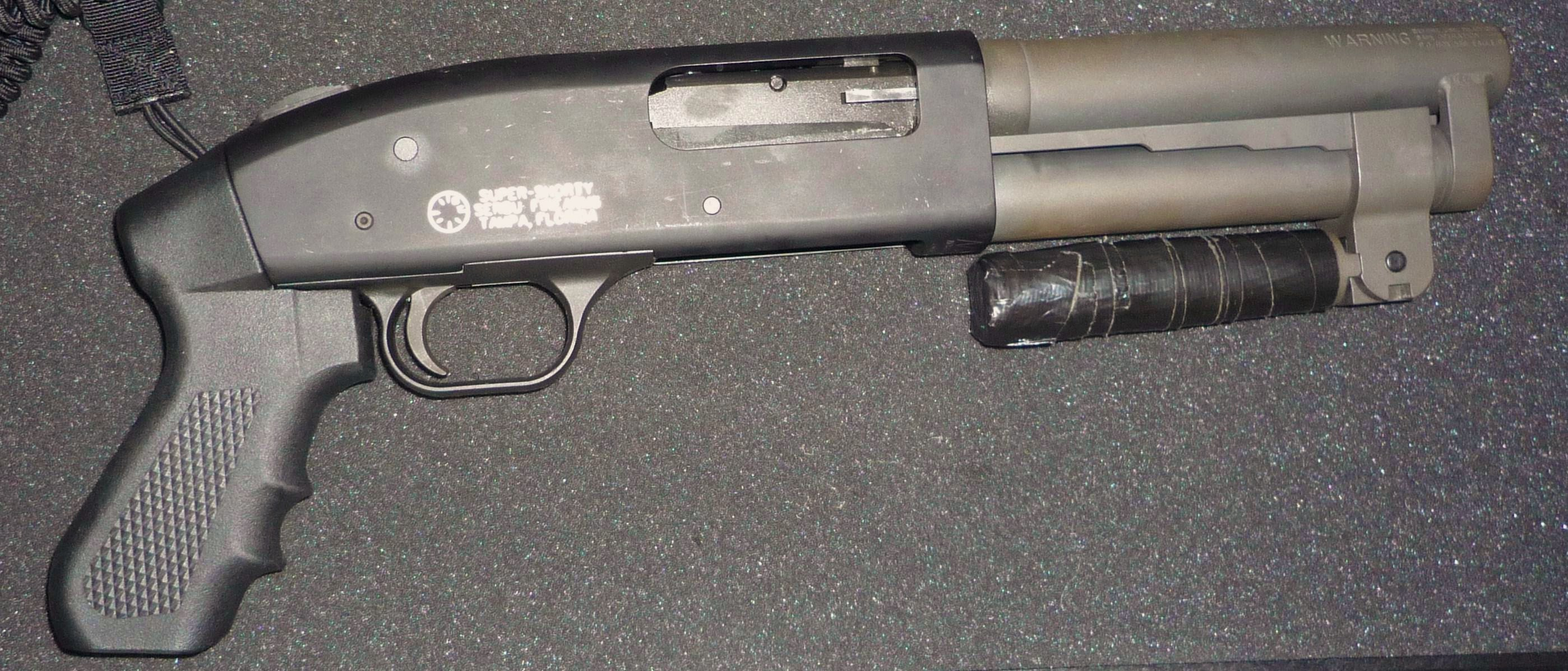
Serbu Super-Shorty

Serbu Firearms is an American manufacturer of firearms based in Tampa, Florida, founded by mechanical engineer Mark Serbu.

== History ==
After earning a Bachelor of Science degree in mechanical engineering from the University of South Florida in 1990, Mark Serbu found employment building flight simulators, founding Serbu Firearms as a part time occupation in 1995. In 1999, he quit his job as a flight simulator designer entirely to dedicate to his firearm business full-time.

The company is known for manufacturing simple and affordable .50 BMG rifles, such as the single-shot bolt-action BFG-50, the semi-automatic BFG-50A and the single-shot break-action RN-50.

Serbu Firearms is also noted for its now discontinued production of the Super-Shorty, a compact 12 or 20 gauge pump-action shotgun with front and rear pistol grips. In the United States, it is regulated as what is called Any Other Weapon under the National Firearms Act.

== Controversy ==
=== Soup Nazi incident ===
In 2013, Serbu refused to sell their model BFG-50A semi-automatic .50 rifles to the New York City Police Department after the passage of the NY SAFE Act that classified their weapon as an assault weapon. Instances like this, in which a firearms manufacturer refuses to supply state entities with weapons that are forbidden to their private citizens, have become more common. Following their refusal to sell the rifles, Serbu then had T-shirts printed with an image of the classic Seinfeld character The Soup Nazi, played by actor Larry Thomas, and the words "No Serbu For You". Thomas, a gun control advocate who had not authorized the use of his likeness, contacted Facebook and the T-shirt printers to have them removed. Serbu had since removed the image of Thomas and replaced it with one of Mark Serbu.

=== RN-50 explosion ===
On April 9, 2021, firearms YouTuber Scott DeShields Jr., known for his channel Kentucky Ballistics, suffered critical injuries while recording a video shooting the model RN-50 rifle using old .50 BMG SLAP rounds. The gun exploded as DeShields fired the last round, sending shrapnel into his face and torso, lacerating his jugular vein, breaking his nose and puncturing his right lung. He went through extensive emergency surgery at the Vanderbilt University Medical Center and was discharged after eight days, referring to the malfunction as a "freak accident" and blaming it on a faulty cartridge. Mark Serbu released a video statement on the incident in his YouTube channel, to "assure people that the RN-50 is a safe gun", saying "It's a terrible thing. I’ve got 10,000 guns out there with my name on them and I don’t want anybody getting hurt with them". DeShields later recreated the accident with a remotely-fired RN-50, and found that other rounds from the same batch were also loaded to excessive pressure.
