= Frankenstein Day =

Literary holiday

- Also called: National Frankenstein Day
- Type: National
- Date: August 30
- Next time: 30 August 2027
- Frequency: annually

Frankenstein Day is an annual holiday celebrated on August 30, Mary Shelley's birthday, in celebration of her 1818 novel Frankenstein; or, The Modern Prometheus.

== History ==
Mary Shelley was born on August 30, 1797. She wrote the novel Frankenstein in 1816, and published it in 1818. The holiday Frankenstein Day was created to honor Mary Shelley and Frankenstein, every year on the anniversary of her birthday. Frankenstein Day has also been known as National Frankenstein Day.
