= The Day of the Beast (novel) =

1922 novel by Zane Grey

- Author: Zane Grey
- Language: English
- Publication date: 1922

The Day of the Beast is a 1922 novel by Zane Grey.

== Plot introduction ==
Daren Lane, a World War I veteran, returns from the battlefields of Europe to the American Midwest. In Middletown USA, he encounters a postwar Jazz Age society whose revelers are tired of hearing about the war. Lane attempts to stem the tide of hedonism and debauchery that is sweeping the town with mixed results.
