= Linda Feferman =

American filmmaker (born 1949)

- Born: November 10, 1949 (age 76); Buffalo, New York, U.S.
- Awards: Guggenheim Fellow (1977)

Academic background
- Education: University of Michigan; University at Buffalo; New York University (BFA)

Linda Feferman (born November 10, 1949) is an American film and television director and producer.

A 1977 Guggenheim Fellow and 1978 MacDowell Fellow, she has received Grammy Award and Primetime Emmy Award nominations, and won the Special Jury Recognition For Youth Comedy award at the 1986 Sundance Film Festival as director of the 1986 feature film Seven Minutes in Heaven.

== Life and career ==
Linda Feferman was born on November 10, 1949, in Buffalo, New York. She is the daughter of Harriet (née Baker) and Oscar A. Feferman, a businessman who ran women's clothing retail stores. She attended Amherst Central High School.

After studying at the University of Michigan, University at Buffalo, and New York University, the last of where she got her BFA in 1971, Feferman began her career directing films such as Dirty Books (1971), Linda's Film on Menstruation (1974), and The Girl with the Incredible Feeling. In 1977, she worked as a visiting professor at Bard College. The same year, she was awarded a Guggenheim Fellowship for filmmaking. She was also a 1978 MacDowell Colony Fellow.

As an intern for the American Film Institute, Feferman was part of the crew of the 1980 film The Blues Brothers. In 1986, she directed the feature film Seven Minutes in Heaven. for which she was also screenwriter. She won the Special Jury Recognition For Youth Comedy award at the 1986 Sundance Film Festival for her work on the film, as well as a Grand Jury Prize nomination.

At the 43rd Primetime Emmy Awards in 1991, Feferman was nominated for the Primetime Emmy Award for Outstanding Individual Achievement in Informational Programming for her directorial work on the series The Astronomers. In 1998, she was the producer of the PBS documentary series Life Beyond Earth. In 1996, she helped nine California Institute of the Arts students produce a music video for James McMurtry's album Where’d You Hide the Body at the invitation of talent manager and friend Mark Spector; she was nominated for the Grammy Award for Best Long Form Music Video for her work as a producer and co-director for the video.

In the 2000s, Feferman was a director for Closer to Truth and a producer for the BBC documentary Auschwitz: The Nazis and 'The Final Solution' (2005). In 2017, she directed An Evening With Piper Laurie, a documentary about the career of actress Piper Laurie, which premiered at the Ojai Film Festival.

Feferman has also taught master classes in film production at the University of New Mexico, USC School of Cinematic Arts, and UCLA School of Theater, Film and Television.
