= The Soup Nazi =

- Seinfeld episode
- Episode no.: Season 7 Episode 6
- Directed by: Andy Ackerman
- Written by: Spike Feresten
- Production code: 706
- Original air date: November 2, 1995

Guest appearances
- Wayne Knight as Newman; Heidi Swedberg as Susan Ross; Larry Thomas as Yev Kassem/The Soup Nazi; Thom Barry as Building Superintendent; Steve Hytner as Kenny Bania; Ana Gasteyer as Woman; Alexandra Wentworth as Sheila; John Paragon as Cedric; Yul Vazquez as Bob; Vince Malocchi as Furniture Guy; Michael Michaud as Customer

Episode chronology
← Previous "The Hot Tub"	Next → "The Secret Code"
- Seinfeld season 7

"The Soup Nazi" is the 116th episode of the American sitcom Seinfeld, which was the sixth episode of the seventh season. It first aired in the United States on November 2, 1995 on NBC. In this episode, Jerry appeases the "Soup Nazi" (Larry Thomas) for access to his delicious soups; George looks down on Jerry and his girlfriend's excessive affection; and Kramer fails to safeguard Elaine's new antique armoire. The Soup Nazi's catchphrase "No soup for you!" is one of the many Seinfeld elements that have lived on in popularity and influence.

== Plot ==
Jerry praises a shop serving staggeringly good soups, but warns that the temperamental proprietor Yev Kassem, known as the "Soup Nazi", enforces strict rules for ordering and does not tolerate "extraneous" remarks. After waiting in a long line stretching out Kassem's door, Jerry and George order. Despite Jerry's warning, George complains about not getting free bread, and Kassem sends him off with no soup and his money back. Jerry will not share with George, forcing him to try again.

Elaine buys an antique armoire off the sidewalk, but is not allowed to move it into her apartment building on a Sunday. With no place to keep the armoire, she enlists Kramer to stand guard overnight, in exchange for some soup from Kassem. Not taking Jerry's advice or George's example seriously, Elaine presumptuously makes small talk with Kassem while ordering, and gets banned for a year. Kramer gets intimidated by Bob and Cedric, two "street toughs" who appreciate fine furniture, and loses the armoire to them.

Jerry and his girlfriend Sheila engage in constant lovey-dovey smooching and baby talk. Sheila does not refrain in front of Kassem, and gets thrown out; Jerry, calculating that Sheila forgives easier than Kassem, pretends not to know her. George, nauseated by the couple, starts condescending to Jerry; Elaine commiserates and encourages him to call Jerry out, but then does not back George up. George mocks Jerry and Sheila to their face by mimicking them with Susan, but takes his act too far when Susan takes it as genuine affection. Jerry then splits up with Sheila, and condescends to George as he is forced to keep indulging Susan.

Since Kramer is "the only one" who understands his uncompromising standards, Kassem lends an ear for Kramer's troubles, and lets him have a spare armoire for free. Overjoyed by the replacement, Elaine thanks Kassem in person, but, seeing the real recipient, he spitefully regrets doing the favor. Affronted, Elaine discovers Kassem's secret soup recipes in the armoire, and plans to publicize them in revenge. Confronted with the recipes, Kassem decides to close up shop and leave the country. Newman and Jerry frantically run to stockpile the last of Kassem's soup.

== Production ==
"The Soup Nazi" was Spike Feresten's first credited Seinfeld episode as a writer. The idea for the episode arose when Feresten told Jerry Seinfeld and Larry David about New York soup vendor Al Yeganeh, who was nicknamed "The Soup Nazi". Seinfeld and David laughed and said, "That's a show. Do that as your first show". Feresten's inspiration for the armoire subplot was a New York apartment building where he had lived, which forbade moving furniture on certain days. The armoire thieves were written as homosexual because Larry David decided that "only gay guys would steal an armoire". At the time Feresten wrote the episode, both he and Seinfeld were dating women who would use affectionate baby talk with them, which led to the Jerry/Sheila story.

The first cast table reading for "The Soup Nazi" was held on September 28, 1995, and it was filmed before a studio audience on October 3. In the episode, Elaine (Julia Louis-Dreyfus) references Scent of a Woman. Louis-Dreyfus had never seen the film, but Seinfeld suggested she do an impersonation of Al Pacino's character and showed her how.

== Character ==
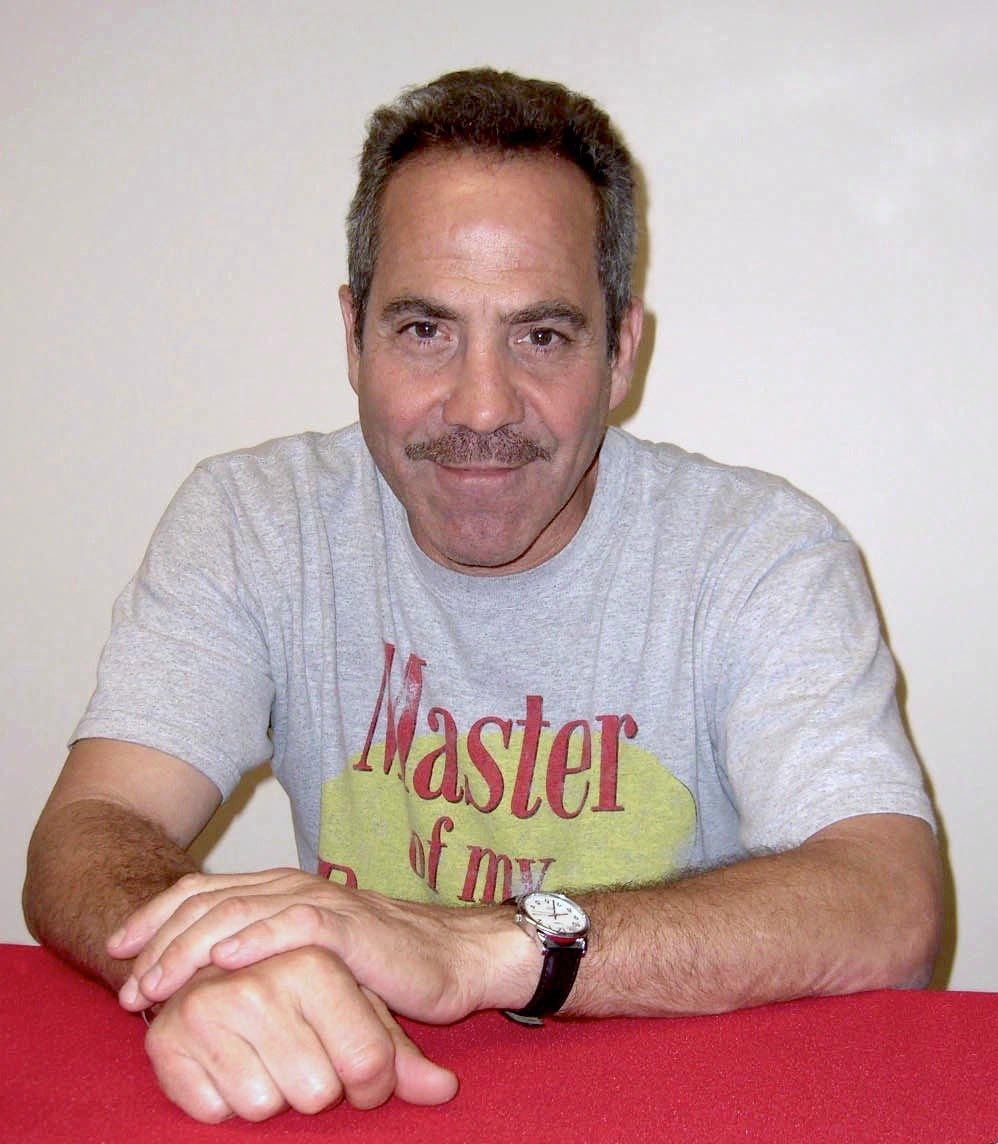
Actor Larry Thomas polished his portrayal of the Soup Nazi by studying Omar Sharif's accent in Lawrence of Arabia, and received an Emmy Award nomination for his performance.

The Soup Nazi was portrayed by Larry Thomas. Thomas, who did not realize that the character was based on a real person, received the inspiration for his portrayal from watching Lawrence of Arabia and studying Omar Sharif's accent.

The Soup Nazi has a cameo in the Seinfeld series finale, in which his true name is revealed. He is a witness in the case against Seinfeld, Elaine, George and Kramer. He tells Hoyt about how he banned Elaine from his shop, only for her to return and ruin his business, forcing him to move to Argentina (paralleling the Ratlines used by the real Nazis). Elaine angers him by smugly claiming, "His soup wasn't all that good anyway."

=== Inspiration ===
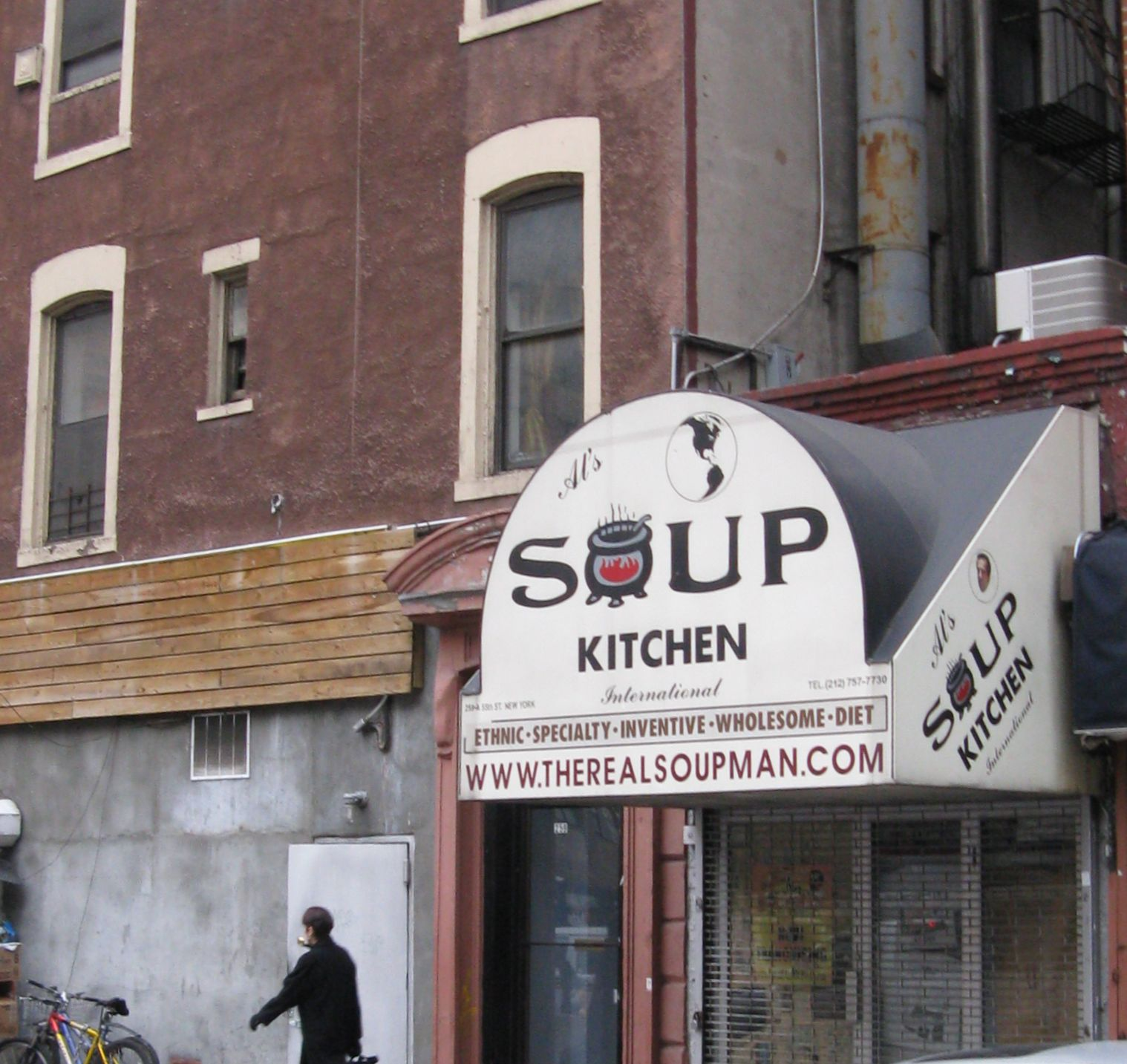
The restaurant Soup Kitchen International was the inspiration for this episode of Seinfeld. The restaurant closed in 2004, but has since reopened.

The character was inspired by Ali "Al" Yeganeh (Persian: علی یگانه), an Iranian-American soup vendor who ran Soup Kitchen International on West 55th Street in New York City, eventually turning it into the chain The Original Soup Man. Yeganeh was originally offended by the portrayal.

According to writer Spike Feresten, Jerry Seinfeld and several members of the production team went to Soup Kitchen International for lunch weeks after "The Soup Nazi" aired. Upon recognizing Seinfeld, Yeganeh "did a triple take" and went into a profanity-filled rant about how the show had "ruined" his business, demanding an apology. Seinfeld gave what Feresten describes as "the most sarcastic apology I've ever seen anyone give." Feresten has also said that some of the episode's encounters in the soup line, such as Elaine slapping her hands on the counter and telling the Soup Nazi he looks like Al Pacino, were based on scenes he witnessed at Yeganeh's real-life soup outlet.

According to Nora Ephron's DVD commentary, the first pop culture reference to Yeganeh (though not by name) seems to have come years before the Seinfeld episode, in the 1993 movie Sleepless in Seattle. In the film, an unseen journalist pitches a story for the lifestyle section of The Baltimore Sun to their editor: "This man sells the greatest soup you have ever eaten, and he is the meanest man in America. I feel very strongly about this, Becky; it's not just about the soup."

== Legacy ==
Thomas's portrayal of the Soup Nazi earned him a nomination for the Primetime Emmy Award for Outstanding Guest Actor in a Comedy Series in 1996.

=== Advertising ===
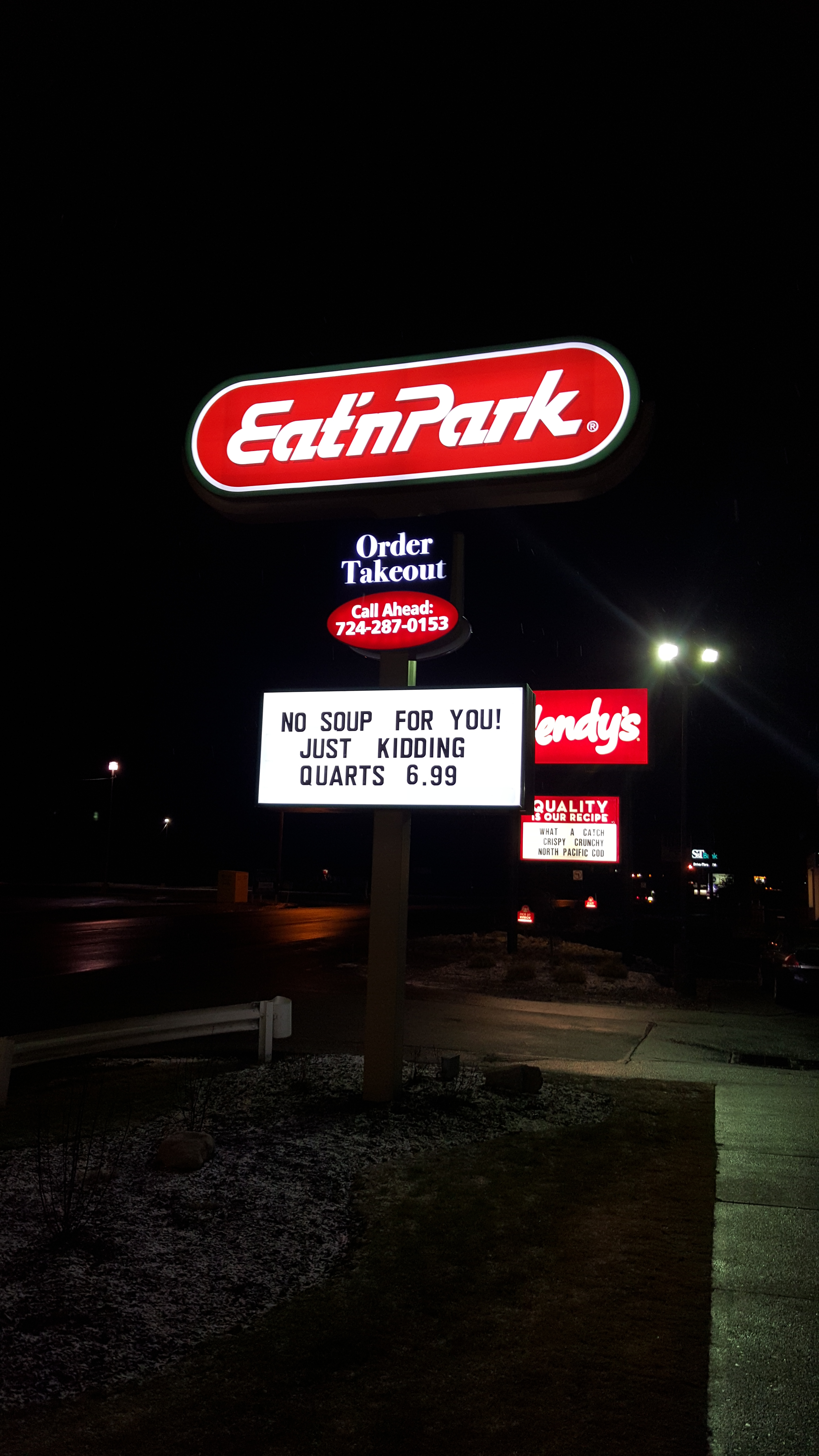
An Eat'n Park sign featuring the Soup Nazi's catchphrase as a joke in 2016.

Like Jackie Chiles, the Soup Nazi character (played by Thomas) has appeared in commercials after the end of the series.

- In an advertisement by the corporate lobbying group Center for Consumer Freedom, he denies food to people he considers to be too fat.
- In June 2015, Thomas collaborated with Pepsi Max to promote their Top Street Food Project in Israel. According to the website, "US actor Larry Thomas, the notorious Soup Nazi from the hit series Seinfeld, roams the streets of Tel Aviv in a new Pepsi Max commercial, striking fear into the hearts of Israeli salesmen and women as he searches for the perfect meal and demands a suitable beverage to quench his thirst."
- Thomas appeared, in character, along with Jerry Seinfeld in a television commercial for Acura that aired during the 2012 Super Bowl. In the advertisement, Seinfeld is trying to bribe an ordinary guy to get an Acura, offering him soup from The Soup Nazi, who happily offers "Soup for you!". After Jay Leno beat Jerry Seinfeld in bribing the ordinary guy, the Soup Nazi was seen with Jerry, an alien, and a "Munchkin" at a restaurant where they are angered at Jay Leno's actions.
- In 2013, Serbu Firearms refused to sell their model BFG-50A semi-automatic .50 rifles to the New York City Police Department after the passage of the NY SAFE Act that classified their weapon as an assault rifle. They issued a T-shirt depicting the Soup Nazi, with the slogan "No Serbu For You!" Serbu has since removed the image of Thomas and replaced it with one of their founder Mark Serbu.

=== In popular culture ===
- Two allusions appear in the sitcom Arrested Development. In Season 3, episode 2 "For British Eyes Only" (Sept. 26, 2005), the crooked housing entrepreneur George Bluth Sr. is charged with signing a development deal with Saddam Hussein, despite the embargo against Iraq. Bluth claims that he acted in good faith, mistakenly believing that Hussein was Larry Thomas because of his resemblance to the Soup Nazi.
- On the November 5, 2011 episode of Saturday Night Live, host Charlie Day played a Columbo-like character, Crime Detective, in the sketch "Crime Scene." Jason Sudeikis, as Officer Dan Owens, is continually surprised by the Detective's unworldliness and ignorance of television. Officer Owens remarks that the crime scene looks exactly like Jerry's apartment, down to the placement of the furniture, then laughs when the Crime Detective (who has never heard of Seinfeld) bugs out exactly like Kramer upon seeing two soup bowls on the kitchen counter. Having agreed that, with no signs of a forced entry or a struggle, the murderer might be a neighbor, Owens suggests that maybe "someone didn't like his soup and killed him over it." To Owens's outrage, the Crime Detective speculates, "What, like some kind of soup Nazi?"

=== In-person promotions ===
- Larry Thomas has used the character to promote soup kitchens for the homeless.
- In July 2012, the "Seinfeld Food Truck" embarked on an eight-stop United States tour. The truck, driven by Larry Thomas, handed out free soup along with other Seinfeld-related food items: Snapple, Twix, Junior Mints, black and white cookies, and muffin tops.
- Thomas was hired by Yeganeh's company in July 2015 to portray the Yev Kassem character as promotion for Soupman products.

=== Other ===
- The episode inspired an actual soup chain, Soup Nutsy, which opened in 1996 in New York City. Though it had no official connection to, or endorsement from, Seinfeld or its creators, it included specific Seinfeld references such as describing two of its soups as "Jerry's Favorite" and "Kramer's Favorite". In 1997 it was bought by Franchise Concepts. As of 2026, a few of its locations remain in Toronto, Ontario in Canada.
- The 2009 Seinfeld: A XXX Parody was inspired by The Soup Nazi.
