= Len Jenkin =

American dramatist (born 1941)

- Born: April 2, 1941 (age 85); New York City, U.S.
- Education: Columbia University
- Occupations: Playwright; novelist; screenwriter; theatrical director
- Children: Emily

Len Jenkin (born April 2, 1941) is an American playwright, novelist, screenwriter, and theatrical director. He has won three Obie Awards, including two for writing and directing his 1980 play Limbo Tales.

Born in New York City, Jenkin attended Columbia University. He has also participated in the theatre lab at the Sundance Institute. Jenkin has influenced fellow playwright Mac Wellman in his own teaching.

In addition to his Obie Awards, Jenkin has been awarded a Guggenheim Fellowship and won the Rockefeller Foundation Award. He has been nominated for an Emmy Award and four National Endowment for the Arts fellowships.

As a writer for television, Jenkin has produced scripts for Family, The Incredible Hulk, and ABC Afterschool Special. His novels include New Jerusalem (also a play) and The Secret Life of Billy's Uncle Myron. The latter was written with his daughter Emily Jenkins, better known as the novelist E. Lockhart.

== Plays ==
- Kitty Hawk (1972)
- Gogol: A Mystery Play with Mac Wellman (1976)
- The Death and Life of Jesse James (1978)
- Limbo Tales (1980)
- Five of Us (1981)
- Dark Ride (1982)
- My Uncle Sam (1983)
- Poor Folks' Pleasure (1987)
- Pilgrims of the Night (1991)
- Careless Love (1993)
- Ramona Quimby (1994)
- Like I Say (2003)
- Margo Veil (2008)
- The Dream Express (2009)
