= Larry Thomas (actor) =

American actor

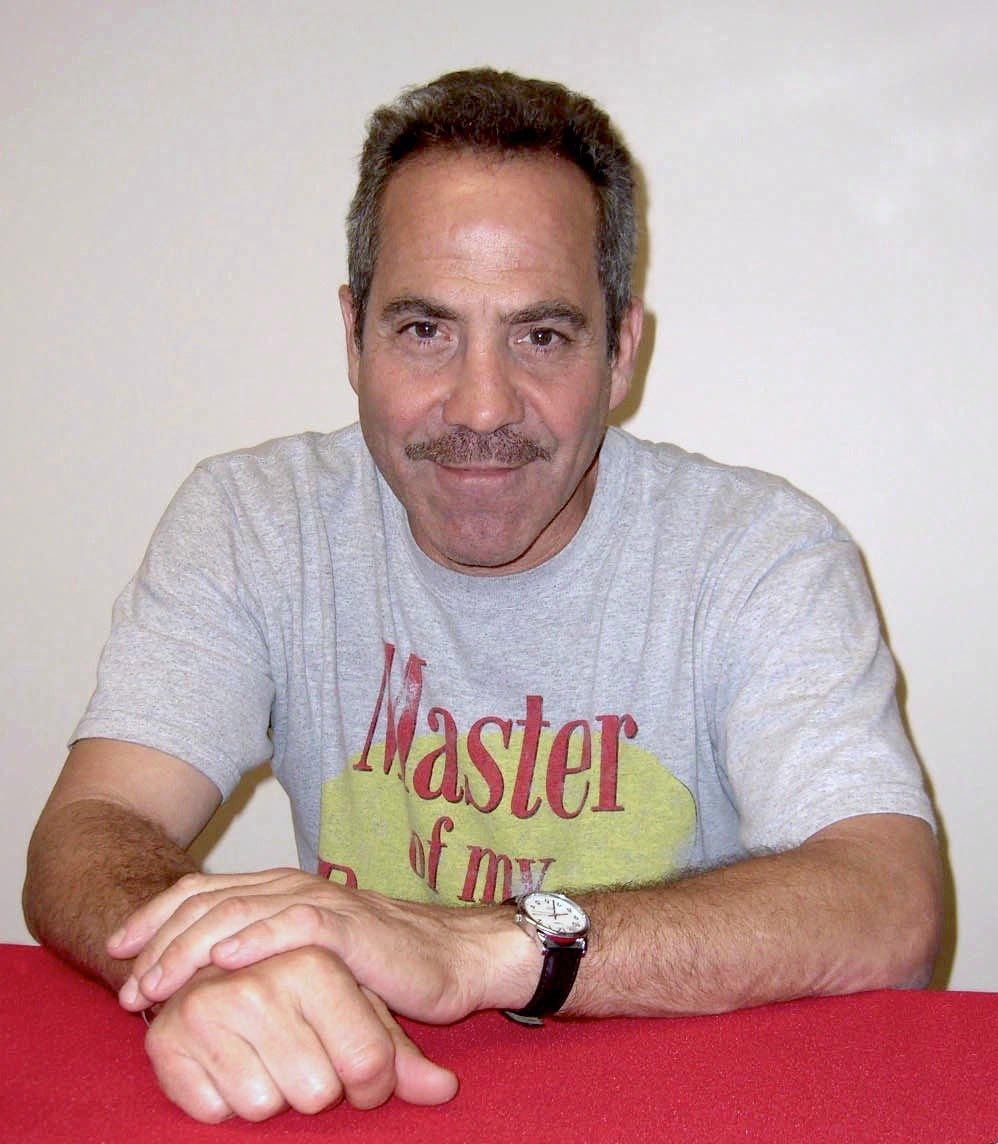
- Thomas at the Big Apple Convention in Manhattan on October 1, 2010
- Born: Laurence Tomashoff; 1956 or 1957 (age 69–70); New York City, U.S.
- Occupation: Actor
- Years active: 1980–present
- Children: 1
- Website: www.realsoupnazi.com

Laurence Tomashoff (born 1956 or 1957), known professionally as Larry Thomas, is an American actor, best known for his guest role as Yev Kassem/the Soup Nazi on Seinfeld, for which he was nominated for an Emmy Award. In addition to making personal appearances as the Soup Nazi, Thomas has appeared in a number of films, television shows, and commercials, and appears at autograph-signing shows across the country.

== Early life ==
Thomas was born in the New York City borough of Brooklyn to an observant Jewish family of Russian and Romanian background. His parents divorced and he moved to California alongside his mother and sister when he was 11. He attended Hebrew school after school hours.

== Career ==
=== Acting ===
Prior to acting, Thomas had jobs as a bail bondsman and court investigator. He is best known for his role as Yev Kassem in the "Soup Nazi" episode of the television sitcom Seinfeld. Thomas took an acting workshop taught by Jeffrey Tambor, who was fascinated by Thomas’ acting skill. Students in the class convinced Tambor to write a letter to Marc Hirschfeld, who was the casting director of The Larry Sanders Show (which starred Tambor) as well as Seinfeld. Thomas, who was a huge fan of the series, got a call from Hirschfield for the Soup Nazi role. He arrived at his audition in character and in a military uniform, and won the role by improvising his now-famous line, "No soup for you!" His widely acclaimed performance earned him a nomination for the Primetime Emmy Award for Outstanding Guest Actor in a Comedy Series in 1996, which he lost to Tim Conway for Coach. He reprised the role in the series' final episode.

In 1997, Thomas made a cameo appearance as the blackjack dealer in Austin Powers: International Man of Mystery, sharing the scene with Mike Myers and Robert Wagner. In 2004, he guest-starred as himself in the Scrubs episode "My Self-Examination", where the main character tried to trick him into saying the Soup Nazi's catchphrase, "No Soup for You!" He also played a Soup Nazi-like "food cop" in a commercial for the Center for Consumer Freedom. That same year he guest-starred in the television series Drake & Josh as Bob Galloway, in the episode "2 Idiots and a Baby."

In 2006, Thomas made an appearance in Scott Grenke's independent comedy feature Spaced Out (which includes a variation of the catchphrase). This was the start of a working relationship with Boomstick Films, which included co-starring roles in Not Another B Movie, Dr. Spine, and the award-winning Paranormal Activity spoof Paranormal Calamity. Thomas also guest-starred in Arrested Development as a Saddam Hussein lookalike, and portrayed Osama bin Laden in Uwe Boll's 2008 shock comedy film Postal.

In 2009, Thomas appeared in the independent feature Untitled Horror Comedy playing the role of "Dwayne."

In February 2012, Thomas again appeared as the Soup Nazi in an Acura NSX commercial featuring comedians Jerry Seinfeld and Jay Leno.

In February 2013, he began filming for Tesla Effect: A Tex Murphy Adventure, a video game using live-action cut-scenes.

In 2016, he appeared in a short comedy film The Love Suckers, playing a marriage therapist giving bad advice to a couple along with Eddie Deezen and Caryn Richman.

His latest project is Dads!, a television sitcom pilot that is written, directed, and produced by Thomas and David Everhart Castro. It is currently in post-production.

=== Public appearances as the Soup Nazi ===
In 2006, Thomas began selling autographed photographs of himself through catalogs such as Wall Street Creations Inc., glaring at the camera in chef's garb, with the handwritten notation "No soup for you!"

In 2011, Thomas appeared dressed as the Soup Nazi at a New York Mets game. He gave DVDs to fans who correctly answered trivia questions.

In 2012, he again appeared as the Soup Nazi while touring the United States with a Seinfeld food truck, allowing fans to pose with him and signing autographs.

On July 5, 2014, he appeared at Brooklyn Cyclones as the Soup Nazi to celebrate Salute to Seinfeld Night, and threw out the first pitch.

In 2015, he reprised his role as the Soup Nazi when Hulu opened "Seinfeld: The Apartment" in New York City, creating a real-world version of Jerry Seinfeld's Upper West Side apartment, complete with a show memorabilia gallery and interactive Seinfeld fan experience to mark the streaming debut of all episodes of the series on Hulu.

=== Music ===
Larry has written and recorded songs: "Nico's Song (With Out You)" written for Dads!, "It's Angela (The Wife I Choose)", "Running, Running, Running (Ben's Song), and "Ma! (Ode to Dorine)".

=== Gun control ===
In 2013, Serbu Firearms refused to sell their model BFG-50A semi-automatic .50 rifles to the New York City Police Department after the passage of the NY SAFE Act that classified their weapon as an assault rifle. Accompanying this, Serbu then had T-shirts printed with an image of Thomas as The Soup Nazi and the words "No Serbu For You". Thomas contacted Facebook and the T-shirt printers to have the shirts removed. Serbu later removed the image of Thomas and replaced it with one of their founder Mark Serbu.

== Filmography ==
=== Film ===
Year	Title	Role	Notes
1980	Terror on Tour	Tim	
1988	Streets of Death	Artie Benson	Direct-to-video
1991	F.A.R.T. the Movie	Guest	Direct-to-video
1997	Austin Powers: International Man of Mystery	Casino Dealer	
1998	Surface to Air	Colonel Mustafa Kahlid	
1998	Hyacinth	Mideastern Man	
1999	When Actors Attack	Angry Actor	
2003	BachelorMan	Doctor	
2005	Knight to F4	Chess Reporter	
2006	Spaced Out	Senator Hardly	Direct-to-video
2007	Postal	Osama bin Laden	
2007	Frankie D	Happy	
2009	Untitled Horror Comedy	Dwayne	
2010	Paranormal Calamity	Dr. Dick Asskis	
2010	Not Another B Movie	Larry	
2010	Changing Hands	Barry	
2011	We Will Rock You	Hamid Bin Al-Sheib	
2011	Redemption: For Robbing the Dead	Josiah	
2012	3 of a Kind	Mr. Cook	
2013	You Don't Say!	Mr. Melendez	
2014	108 Stitches	Coach Kassem Bosco	
2014	Hacks	Larry	
2015	Doctor Spine	Doctor Chiller	
2015	Spades	The Professor	
2016	Mind Over Mindy	Dr. Ivan Fischer	
2016	Surge of Power: Revenge of the Sequel	Al Yagen, Food Cart Vendor	
2018	Red Team Go	The Boss	
2022	Honest to God	Dr. Haija	

=== Television ===
Year	Title	Role	Notes
1981	Ladies' Man	Singing Messenger	Episode: "Andrea's Crush"
1995, 1998	Seinfeld	Yev "The Soup Nazi" Kassem	2 episodes
1996	Kirk	Maynard	Episode: "Hey, Hey We're the Hartmans"
1996	Grace Under Fire	Ticket agent	Episode: "Fire Music"
1996	Mr. & Mrs. Smith	Mr. Rolfe	Episode: "The Impossible Mission Episode"
1996, 1997	Arliss	Arabic Man / Sheik Caspia	2 episodes
1997	Caroline in the City	Maitre'd	Episode: "Caroline and the Kept Man"
1997	USA High	Girard	Episode: "The Headmaster's Daughter"
1998	Beyond Belief: Fact or Fiction	Grant	2 episodes
1998	The Tony Danza Show	Man #1	Episode: "Thanks... But No Thanksgiving"
1998	Sabrina the Teenage Witch	Zampano	Episode: "And the Sabrina Goes to..."
1999	L.A. Heat	Nelson	Episode: "Vengeance"
1999	Martial Law	Achmed Sabib	Episode: "My Man Sammo"
2001	The Geena Davis Show	Giancarlo	Episode: "Hot Potato"
2002	One on One	Akhmad the Taxi Driver	Episode: "Give Me Some Credit"
2002	Sympathy Cop	Sympathy Cop	3 episodes
2003	General Hospital	Barry	Episode #1.10184
2003	CSI: Crime Scene Investigation	Convenience Store Clerk	Episode: "Last Laugh"
2003	Knee High P.I.	Sheik	Television film
2004	Drake & Josh	Mr. Galloway	Episode: "Two Idiots and a Baby"
2004	Scrubs	Larry	Episode: "My Self-Examination"
2005	Studio House	Nathan	Television film
2005	Threshold	Norm	Episode: "The Order"
2005	Hot Properties	DMV Worker	Episode: "Whatever Lola Wants"
2006	Arrested Development	Saddam Hussein #3	Episode: "Exit Strategy"
2017	Mommy, I Didn't Do It	Mr. Allen	Television film

=== Video games ===
Year	Title	Role
2014	Tesla Effect: A Tex Murphy Adventure	Lt. Danwicz
