= James Vallo =

American producer and actor

- Born: United States
- Occupation(s): Film producer, actor

James Vallo is an American producer and actor who played the role of Al Manac in Space Daze and its sequel Spaced Out. His productions include Sister Mary, Not Another B Movie, Chasing Hollywood and Paranormal Calamity.

== Filmography ==
Film
Year	Film	Role	Notes
1984	Sixteen Candles	Bandie	Uncredited
1986	Lucas	Spectator	Uncredited
1989	A Nightmare on Elm Street 5: The Dream Child	Paramedic	Uncredited
1993	There Are No Children Here	Prison Guard	
2005	Space Daze	Al Manac/Cartilage Man	Also Producer
2005	Make Your Own Damn Movie!	Himself	Documentary DVD Set
2006	Voices from the Graves	Murder Suspect	
2009	Spaced Out	Al Manac	Also Producer and Second Unit Director
2009	Michael Morlock's Supernatural World		Associate Producer only
2009	Satanic Panic	Sanitation Worker	
2009	Like a Moth to a Flame	Police Chief	Anthology film; Segment: "Deep"
2010	Not Another B Movie	James	Also Producer
2010	Paranormal Calamity	Dr. Waldo Chaps	Also Producer
2010	Mountain Mafia	Red	
2011	Sister Mary	Mark Rima	Also Producer
2011	Chasing Hollywood	Himself	Also Producer and Casting Director
Television
Year	Title	Role	Notes
1985	American Playhouse	Army Man	Episode: "The Killing Floor"
1989	The Women of Brewster Place	Marine	TV miniseries
1995	Danny!	Alien Skeptic	Talk Show; Episode unknown
