= Śmigielski =

- Pronunciation: [ˈɕmiɡʲɛlski]
- Language: Polish

Origin
- Language: Slavic
- Meaning: from Śmigiel
- Region of origin: Poland, particularly Śmigiel

Other names
- Variant forms: Smigelschi, Smigielski, Śmigelski, Szmigielski

Śmigielski [ˈɕmiɡʲɛlski] (feminine: Śmigielska [ˈɕmiɡʲɛlska], plural: Śmigielscy [ˈɕmiɡʲɛlst͡sɨ]) and its variants are is a Polish surname meaning someone from Śmigiel and ultimately derived from the verb śmigać, "to move swiftly". Related names include Schmiegel, Smigel and Śmigiel. Variants of the name start with Sm-, Śm-, or Szm-; may or may not contain an 'i' following the 'g'; may or may not contain an 'ł' instead of an 'l'; and end with -chi, -ski, or -szki. Historically, the family was of nobility and used the Łodzia coat of arms.

== People ==
- Adam Śmigielski(1650–1716), Polish noble
- Adam Śmigielski (1933–2008), Polish Roman Catholic bishop
- Bogdan Śmigielski (1929–2013), Polish actor
- Bogusław Śmigielski (born 1958), Polish politician and laryngologist
- David Szmigielski (born 1994), Polish-American investment banker, conservationist, art collector, and Forbes honoree
- Henryk Śmigielski (1911–1993), Polish telecommunications engineer and associate professor
- Jarosław Śmigielski (1914–2002), Polish basketball player
- Jerzy Śmigielski (1890–1953), Polish officer and diplomat
- Leszek Śmigielski (1927–1994), Polish actor and director
- Octavian Smigelschi (1866–1912), Austro-Hungarian painter and printmaker
- Piotr Śmigielski (born 1989), Polish basketball player
- Robert Śmigielski (born 1966), Polish orthopedist
- Roman Śmigielski (born 1951), Polish activist, politician, journalist
- Stanisław Śmigielski (died 1618), Polish friar
- Stefan Śmigielski (1921–1990), Polish architect
- Tadeusz Śmigielski (1913–unknown), Polish lieutenant
- Victor Smigelschi (1858–1918), Romanian friar and lecturer
- Władysław Śmigielski (1937–1995), Polish field hockey player
- Wojciech Śmigielski (1934–2017), Polish archaeologist

== Bibliography ==
- Kasper Niesiecki: Herbarz Polski (Polish Armorial), Lwów, 1738
