= Come Poop with Me =

Studio album by Triumph the Insult Comic Dog
- Released: November 4, 2003
- Recorded: 2003
- Genre: Comedy
- Length: 74:02
- Label: Warner Bros.

Professional ratings
Review scores
Source	Rating
AllMusic	4/5 stars
Entertainment Weekly	B+

Come Poop with Me is a CD of adult-oriented comedy and songs released by Triumph the Insult Comic Dog (also known as voice actor and puppeteer Robert Smigel) on Warner Bros. Records on November 4, 2003. Its title is a parody of the Frank Sinatra album Come Fly With Me.

Half the album was recorded live at the Bowery Ballroom in New York City and included guest performances by Maya Rudolph, Adam Sandler, Jack Black, Horatio Sanz, Conan O'Brien, and Richard Washington a.k.a. Blackwolf the Dragonmaster, a real-life role playing game fan whom Triumph had ridiculed on an episode of Late Night with Conan O'Brien.

The remainder of the album includes crank calls made by Triumph to a dog kennel and to an STD clinic, as well as several in-studio musical recordings including the album's designated single, "I Keed" which lampoons performers such as Jennifer Lopez, Celine Dion, Philip Glass and makes reference to Triumph's much-publicized feud with rapper Eminem. Another song, "Bob Barker", takes aim at Barker's efforts to have pets spayed and neutered, something to which the always-randy Triumph takes great offense.

Come Poop with Me contains strong language and thus has the parental advisory label.

The original release of the CD included a bonus DVD of performances from the Bowery Ballroom, including extended versions of some of the routines included on the CD along with exclusive performances and material, such as "Little Roundworm", a love ballad performed with Maya Rudolph.

Come Poop with Me was nominated for the 2005 Grammy Award for Best Comedy Album.

== Track listing ==
=== CD ===
Titles with quotes are songs.

1. Intro - 2:59
2. "Who" - 1:37
3. "Underage Bichon" - 3:03
4. Call to Kennel - 2:35
5. "Benji's Queer" - 3:10 (Featuring Doug Dale)
6. On the Road - 2:13
7. "Lick Myself" - 2:24
8. Call to STD Hotline - 2:34
9. "Cats Are Cunts" - 4:59 (Featuring Conan O'Brien)
10. "30 Seconds of Magic" - 3:00 (Featuring Adam Sandler)
11. Call from Triumph's Son - 2:03
12. "Blackwolf" - 4:39 (Featuring Blackwolf the Dragonmaster)
13. Call to Chinese Restaurant - 4:05
14. "You Have to Work Blue" - 7:06 (Featuring Horatio Sanz)
15. "My Mama" - 3:59
16. "Bob Barker" - 2:10 (Featuring Jack Black)
17. Call to Catalog - 4:56
18. "Together in Pooping" - 5:21 (Featuring Maya Rudolph, Sandler, O'Brien, Black, Sanz)
19. "No Rules in the Animal Kingdom" - 4:26

Bonus tracks

1. In the Studio - 2:54
2. "I Keed" - 3:51

=== DVD ===
1. "Little Roundworm" (with Rudolph)
2. Interview (with Kurt Loder and Iann Robinson)
3. "Sense of Smell"
4. Interview (with Vinnie Pastore)
5. "Cats Are Cunts" (with O'Brien)
6. Interview (with Ben "Dell Guy" Curtis)
7. Interview (with Jared "Subway" Fogle)
8. "Blackwolf" (with Blackwolf)
9. Interviews (with Janeane Garofalo and Robert Wuhl)
10. "You Have to Work Blue" (with Sanz)
11. "Bob Barker" (with Black)
12. "Together in Pooping" (with Rudolph, Black, Sandler, O'Brien, Sanz).
