= Śmigiel (disambiguation) =

Śmigiel is a town in Poland.

Śmigiel or Smigiel may also refer to:

- Gmina Śmigiel, a gmina in Poland, with the seat at Śmigiel
- Śmigiel (surname)

== See also ==
- Schmiegel (disambiguation)
- Smigel
