= TV Funhouse =

Animated television series

Saturday TV Funhouse is a segment on NBC's Saturday Night Live (SNL) featuring cartoons created by SNL writer Robert Smigel. 101 "TV Funhouse" segments aired on SNL between 1996 and 2008, with one further segment airing in 2011. It also spawned a short-lived spinoff series, TV Funhouse, that aired on Comedy Central.

== Production ==
Programmed to air between the host segments of Saturday Night Live, TV Funhouse parodied such genres as 1950s educational films, Saturday morning Hanna-Barbera/Ruby-Spears/Filmation cartoons of the 1970s and 1980s, and the 1960s stop motion holiday specials of Rankin/Bass. Any episode of TV Funhouse appearing on Saturday Night Live would be listed by the announcer as "A cartoon by Robert Smigel."

The animation was produced by J.J. Sedelmaier Productions for its first three seasons until Wachtenheim/Marianetti Animation took over primary animation production duties.

=== Recurring SNL TV Funhouse skits ===
- Fun with Real Audio – This sketch presented animated scenes to found, real-life audio tracks. Originally, it was just random things happening to celebrities while they had a conversation or gave a speech, though later on, audio was spliced to make it sound like they were saying something else. One cartoon switched it up and made it "Fun with Some Real Audio", which begins with real-life audio of Madonna performing until she interrupts herself with complaints that the stage is "not sexy enough" (Ana Gasteyer voiced Madonna here).
- The All-New Adventures of Mr. T – A parody of the Ruby-Spears animated series Mister T. This cartoon depicts Mr. T (voiced by Tracy Morgan) as desperate to find work after 10 years, aggressively auditioning for unlikely parts such as classical theatre and tampon commercials with help from Jeff Harris (voiced by Andy Daly), Kim Nakamura (voiced by Ana Gasteyer), Spike O'Neill (voiced by Andrew Daly), and Bulldozer the Bulldog. Whenever he encounters obstacles such as directors telling him auditions are already over, he simply responds with the phrase "Ain't got time for jibber-jabber, I need work!" Mr. T also throws in different advice during his dialogue like "Drink your milk", "Stay in school", "Don't do drugs", and "Eat all your greens". After getting the employment, he would often mix up of all his advice to his companions when stating how one could get work as Bulldozer barks after that.
- The Ambiguously Gay Duo – A parody of the comic book superhero duets. The vaguely homosexual superheroes Ace and Gary (voiced by Stephen Colbert and Steve Carell respectively) fight crime in Metroville while their adversaries like Bighead (voiced by Robert Smigel) and Dr. Brainio (voiced by Stephen Colbert) try to figure out their true sexuality. Bill Chott provides the narration for this cartoon. All the shorts were re-written from The Dana Carvey Show. In the live-action version on the SNL episode hosted by Ed Helms, Jon Hamm and Jimmy Fallon play Ace and Gary while Stephen Colbert and Steve Carell played Dr. Brainio and Bighead.
- The Anatominals Show – A parody of a Yogi Bear–type Hanna-Barbera–style cartoon where Kogi Bear, Pook Bear, Mindy Bear, Sheila Coyote, Betsy Cow, and other animal characters are anatomically correct even when they are confronted by the park ranger during attempts to take picnic baskets. Both episodes were interspersed with scenes of Lorne Michaels (voiced by Robert Smigel) expressing deep disappointment with the show or trying to prevent visitors to Studio 8H from seeing the cartoon.
- The Michael Jackson Show – A parody of Hanna-Barbera cartoons, highlighting the misadventures of Michael Jackson (voiced by Dino Stamatopoulos) and his odd friends. Included in his rag-tag entourage are his talking common chimpanzee Bubbles, an aged Emmanuel Lewis, a talking anthropomorphic llama who's just called Llama, the living skeleton of The Elephant Man (voiced by Robert Smigel impersonating Jimmy Durante), a zebra with a pushmi-pullyu design, the sentient and speaking arm of Elizabeth Taylor, and a sentient urn containing Marilyn Monroe's ashes. Michael's friends often try to get him not to do stuff with little boys which goes comically awry for them. Sometimes when he gets satisfied with a little boy or the aged Emmanuel Lewis, Michael Jackson would have the same reactions that Quick Draw McGraw character Snuffles would have when he gets his dog biscuit. The theme song is to the tune of The Yogi Bear Show.
- The X-Presidents – A parody of Hanna-Barbera/Filmation cartoons from the 1970s. This sketch features former US Presidents Gerald Ford, Jimmy Carter, Ronald Reagan, and George H.W. Bush (all voiced by Jim Morris) as crime-fighting superheroes imbued with superpowers by a "hurricane-powered dose of radiation" received at a celebrity golf tournament. Each of their wives is a member as well. Bill Clinton, despite his status as a living former president, is not a member since he did not receive the hurricane-powered dose of radiation, as he was in office during the initial incident.

==== Disney parodies ====
TV Funhouse did four parodies of The Walt Disney Company. Their first one on April 4, 1998 was a trailer to the cheerful spin on the Titanic called "Titey" which had Jason Alexander voicing Titey and Whoopi Goldberg voicing the "bad old iceberg". The trailer also showed some marine life working together to save Titey from sinking. In addition, Gilbert Gottfried also voiced Napoleon Bonaparte who was on top of the iceberg in one shot during its duel with Titey and Molly Ringwald voiced Anne Frank who sings about writing in a diary someday and mention the exploits of Titey.

The February 10, 2001, episode, "Ray of Light," parodies the controversy over Ray Lewis's involvement in an Atlanta homicide. Although Lewis went on to become the Super Bowl XXXV MVP, he was unable to utter the famous line "I'm going to Disney World!" The skit was involved with Disney "making it up" to Lewis by placing him in various Disney animated movies. Lewis would be shown fleeing the scene of Disney character death scenes, frequently uttering "I didn't see nothin'!" He also did a song stating that he "did not kill no motherf****** lion".

"Bambi 2002," a poke at Disney's penchant for direct-to video sequels at the time, imagines a sequel to the original movie where Bambi's mother turns up alive. The title character fights stylized terrorist types, meets Jared Fogle, and performs a rap music number in the forest. Also in the sketch are moments involving some of Disney's darker issues, as well as some pornographic humor with the unaffiliated film Pokahotass.

On April 15, 2006, Robert Smigel again parodied Disney's home video moratorium policy, as well as Walt Disney's alleged racism and anti-Semitism. When two kids are brought to the Disney Vault by Mickey Mouse, they find Walt's frozen head, several controversial things that were never released, the "very original version" of Song of the South that Walt only screened at parties, and Jim Henson and Kermit the Frog bound and gagged in a chair (Mickey Mouse breaks down and quotes "He wouldn't sell! He wouldn't sell...!", a reference to a broken deal between The Jim Henson Company and The Walt Disney Company c. 1990 following Henson's death; Disney bought the Muppets franchise in 2004, 2 years prior to the sketch).

=== NBC special ===
On April 29, 2006, NBC aired a full-length, 90-minute SNL "best of" special for TV Funhouse. The special was hosted by The Ambiguously Gay Duo interacting with the current SNL cast with a cameo from Jimmy Fallon.

The special was released on DVD October 24, 2006.

== Fox Pilot ==
In 1998, Fox commissioned a pilot from Smigel and Stamatopoulos. An earlier version of what would become Comedy Central's show, "Saturday TV Funhouse" was a dark parody of Bozo, with Smigel playing Prozo, a half-drunk clown. While living in Chicago, Smigel became fascinated with WGN-TV's Bozo’s Circus. He researched old television shows, and with the help of Doug Dale, who played fellow clown Looky, found footage of 1970s children shows such as Gigglesnort Hotel and The BJ and Dirty Dragon Show. After that they started coming up with ideas for the show.

The pilot began with an episode of "Fun With Real Audio." Next in the studio, a character named "Ringmaster Ted" introduces the show and its characters as he stands in front of the audience filled with children and parents. Prozo, “most people’s favorite clown,” played by Smigel; his “kooky pal Looky,” played by Doug Dale; “the mysterious Wizzy,” played by Stamatopoulos; a cat puppet that is licking itself named Furball; and a three-piece TV Funhouse Band, fronted by Floyd Vivino. Some of the segments featured include: Prozo leading the studio audience in song: "If you're Jewish and you know it, clap your hands!" a sketch in which the clowns reenact the Camp David Accords between Bill Clinton, Yasir Arafat, and Benjamin Netanyahu with a trolly full of pies, and an episode of The Ambiguously Gay Duo, among others. A deleted scene showed a sketch featuring Bozo and a speaking outhouse, voiced by Stephen Colbert.

In 2002, Smigel said of Fox declining to show the pilot: "I know this thing is all about 'Fuck the networks! They're idiots! But I don't know...This show has a disturbing element." In June 2009, Just for Laughs sponsored an event at the Lakeshore Theater in Chicago to present the pilot, “I wanted to do the Bozo parody as close to the real thing (Bob Bell) as possible,” Smigel said in the Q&A after, “I didn’t want to do the angry clown thing.”

== Comedy Central's TV Funhouse ==
TV Funhouse
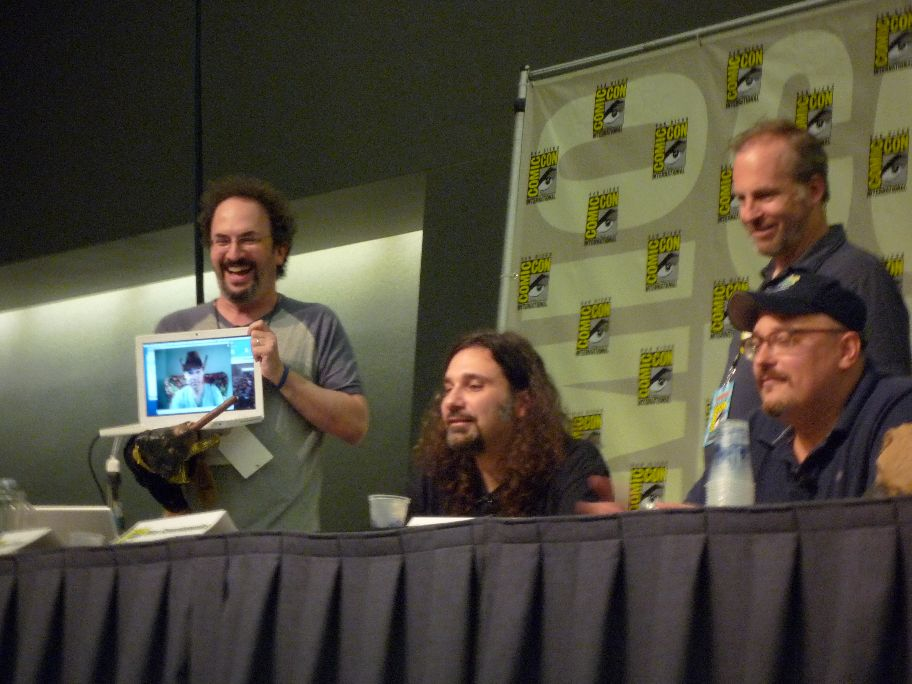
- The TV Funhouse Panel at Comic-Con in 2008. L to R: Robert Smigel (with Triumph the Insult Comic Dog), Dino Stamatopoulos, Bob Odenkirk and Tommy Blacha with Doug Dale on laptop screen
- Also known as: Saturday TV Funhouse
- Created by: Robert Smigel; Dana Carvey
- Starring: Doug Dale; Robert Smigel; Jon Glaser; Dino Stamatopoulos; David Juskow; Tommy Blacha; Frank Simms
- Theme music composer: Steven Gold
- Country of origin: United States
- Original language: English
- No. of series: 1
- No. of episodes: 8

Production
- Executive producers: Robert Smigel; Dino Stamatopoulos; Lou Wallach
- Producers: Samantha Scharff; Tanya Ryno, for SNL
- Running time: 22 Minutes
- Production companies: Poochie Doochie Productions; Comedy Central Productions

Original release
- Network: Comedy Central
- Release: December 6, 2000 – January 24, 2001

Related
- Saturday Night Live

The spinoff series was somewhat of a twisted Pee-Wee's Playhouse-style children's TV show, hosted by Doug Dale and his "Anipals" puppet friends.

=== Plot ===
Every episode had a different theme to it (e.g., "Hawaiian Day" or "Astronaut Day") and saw the Anipals usually getting into some sort of trouble, not wanting to do whatever their happy-go-lucky host had in mind for the day.

The theme song describes this show as the "last cartoon show of the day".

This show didn't show any cartoons from The Ambiguously Gay Duo, The Michael Jackson Show, and/or The X-Presidents despite some of its characters appearing in the theme song.

=== Production ===
The Comedy Central version of TV Funhouse premiered in December 2000 and was not picked up for a second season. Interviews with Smigel indicate that Comedy Central believed in the show, but was disappointed in how it went over budget every episode. Smigel has also expressed how difficult the show was and how tedious the puppet-live animal segments were to shoot.

The show was released on DVD July 22, 2008, under the title Comedy Central's TV Funhouse.

=== Recurring skits ===
- Wonderman — A parody of Max Fleischer's Superman cartoons that stars Wonderman (voiced by Robert Smigel) who fights a constant crusade to stop crime and get his alias of Henry Moore laid.
- Mnemonics: Your Dear, Dear Friend — A parody of educational films about teaching children using a mnemonic for everyday subjects using age-inappropriate mnemonics to improve their memory. Robert Smigel narrates this segment.
- The Baby, the Immigrant, and the Guy on Mushrooms — Artemis the Cat watches over a baby (voiced by Sarah Thyre), an immigrant, and a guy on mushrooms while the female homeowner (voiced by Sarah Thyre) is away. Artemis works to keep the clueless trio out of any danger which always ends with him getting hurt.
- A Michael Kupperman Cartoon - An assortment of cartoons drawn by Michael Kupperman.

=== Episodes ===
No. overall	No. in season	Title	Written by	Original release date	Prod. code	U.S. viewers (millions)
1	1	"Western Day"	Unknown	December 6, 2000	101	N/A
Doug must wrangle up his own fun when the Anipals ditch him to head for high times south of the border in Tijuana.: Wonderman - After stopping a robbery at an ice cream van, Wonderman (voiced by Robert Smigel) meets Velma (voiced by Deanna Storey) and works to hook her up with his alias of Henry Moore so that he can get laid.; Mnemonics: Your, Dear Dear Friend - A live-action educational film discusses how to improve your memory. Featuring Katherine Sena Heisler, Natalie Laspina, Nicholas Boak, and Bryan Hyman as the students, Alan Spilton as the surgeon, and Kate Super as the nurse. Narrated by Robert Smigel.; The Baby, the Immigrant, and the Guy on Mushrooms — Artemis the Cat works to keep the clueless trio from getting into danger at a construction site. Featuring the voices of Doug Dale, Sarah Thyre, and Robert Smigel.; Policeman - A live-action educational film about the duties of a police officer (portrayed by Jay Spadero). Also featuring Robert Trumbull as the governor and Richard Schlam as the chef. Narrated by Eve Josephson.
2	2	"Hawaiian Day"	Unknown	December 13, 2000	102	N/A
Doug and Rocky the Fish have a luau all by themselves while the Anipals help Chickie rescue his 95th son, Jason, from a cult.: Kidder, Downey, and Heche: Private Trespassing Investigators: Margot Kidder, Robert Downey Jr., and Anne Heche (voiced by Ana Gasteyer) use their trespassing abilities to help a woman look for her dog Corky. Featuring the voices of Joe Lo Truglio, Robert Smigel, and Nancy Walsh.; Overcoming Bowel Moments: A Teenager's Guide to Self Control: A live-action educational film that teaches the viewers how to control their bowel movements using God's plan. Featuring Massimo Di Giovanna, Nicholas Joy, Bob Goodman, Mary Ann Conk, Ruth Last, Kevin Payne, and Joe Lo Truglio. Narrated by A.D. Miles who also produced this short.; Klassic Kartoon Kommercials: An advertisement for a bug spray called Attack that stops cockroaches dead. Featuring the voices of Brade Abelle, Darren Baker, Daniel Barrios, Doug Dale, Daniel Fitzgerald, Jen Jiles, and Dino Stamatopoulos.
3	3	"Christmas Day"	Unknown	December 20, 2000	103	N/A
The Anipals tap Doug's spine to extract his Christmas cheer. After one of Chickie's sons helps to turn the cheer into powder, the Anipals become addicts.: Tingles - A stop-motion cartoon about Tingles the Christmas Tension who appears on December 23rd where he sprinkles tension dust everywhere.; Lost Cartoon Flashback Presents: The Harlem Globetrotters First Christmas - The Harlem Globetrotters celebrate their first Christmas where they go back in time to the birth of Jesus. Featuring the voices of Andrew Daly as Saint Joseph, Tyrone Finch as Meadowlark Lemon, Ana Gasteyer as Mary, Tim Meadows as Curly Neal, Tracy Morgan as Hubert "Geese" Ausbie, and Robert Smigel. This segment originally aired on Saturday Night Live on December 12, 1998.; Places to Find Your Christmas Present - An instruction video that tells kids about the different places where they can find their hidden Christmas present. Featuring Gene Burke, Matthew Cowell, Sara Kapner, and Sam Stone. Narrated by Dan Landi.
4	4	"Mexican Day"	Unknown	December 27, 2000	104	N/A
The Anipals appear on the Sally Jessy Raphael Show to help Dave, an endangered lizard, to get laid, leaving Doug to celebrate Mexican Day with a tequila worm and a Puerto Rican Mexican-food delivery guy.: Fetal Scooby-Doo — A parody of the Scooby-Doo series where fetal versions of Mystery Inc. solve a mystery at the old amusement park and have encounters with a fetal Headless Horseman and the Ghost of Baron Von Wilhelm. Featuring the voices of Amy Bennett, Dan Goettel, Elon Gold, Dino Stamatopoulos, and Leyna Juliet Webber.; Jokámel — A Joe Camel parody of the anime series Pokémon following Camel's departure from the cigarette mascot business with the cartoon being tobacco free as the protagonists fight against Team Mortar. There is also commercials for Jokámel products. Featuring Jake Friedland, David Hayes, George G. King III, Lauren O'Neil, Grant Rosenmeyer, and Andrew Zutty, and the voices of Lester Grant, Ashley Greenfield, Dino Stamatopoulos, and Leyna Juliet Webber. Narrated by Julia Ireland and Mark Rivers.; Mnemonics: Your, Dear Dear Friend - Another educational film involving Mnemonics, for reading musical notes, the groups of bones in the spinal column, the first five Presidents of the United States, and the original 13 Colonies of America. Featuring Nicholas Boak, Precious Coleman, Chase MacIntosh, Stella Maeve, and Josh Kaplan. Narrated by Robert Smigel.
5	5	"Caveman Day"	Unknown	January 3, 2001	105	N/A
The Anipals compare New Year's resolutions: Hojo wants to learn to play the saxophone, Chickie hangs out with his brother with Tourette syndrome, and Fogey must resist eating his own poop. Meanwhile, Doug dresses as a caveman and builds a dinosaur skeleton out of baby back ribs, and Rocky the Fish takes a group of kids to visit a cookie factory.: Mischievous Mitchell — A parody of Dennis the Menace as Mitchell does things to taunt his Jewish neighbors the Goldsteins much to the annoyance of his neighbor George Wilton. Featuring the voices of Darrin Baker, Mollu K. Charette, Steve Horowitz, Jennifer Jiles, Jeremy Scwhartz, and Sally Winters.; Lost Cartoon Flashback Presents: The Black Sabbath Show - A supposed lost parody of The Beatles cartoon featuring the band Black Sabbath and their dog Doom Doom going to Hawaii. Featuring the voices of Tommy Blanca and Patrick McCarthy.; Mnemonics: Your, Dear Dear Friend - A third educational film involving Mnemonics, this time for learning the atmospheres, the circular system, and the five stages of grief. Featuring Nicholas Bock, Jordan Duffy, Natalie Laspina, Ed Moran, Max Rock, and Richard Saltzman. Narrated by Robert Smigel.
6	6	"Safari Day"	Unknown	January 10, 2001	106	N/A
Part 1 of 2. The Anipals travel to Atlantic City to visit Fogey's old friend, Triumph the Insult Comic Dog, where Chickie falls in love with a chimp-stitute. Robert Goulet guest stars.: Stedman — A two-part supposed parody of James Bond starring spy Stedman Graham (Tim Meadows), boyfriend of Oprah Winfrey (Maya Rudolph). However, some, including James Brolin (Chris Parnell), think that he is in fact gay and using Oprah's money. When their anniversary occurs, Stedman gets out of his consummation with Oprah by claiming that Professor Hate has escaped from prison as he goes somewhere tropical. Oprah is warned by a vision from Dionne Warwick that Stedman is in danger and goes to help him. Also featuring the voices of Elizabeth Pryor Nagel, Tara Sands, and Ashley Wolfe.; Porn for Everyone — A video of "Silence of the G.A.M.S." where a man engages in censored sexual intercourse with his secretary Ruth. Originally titled "Porn For Kids", changed by the network.
7	7	"Astronaut Day"	Unknown	January 17, 2001	107	N/A
Part 2 of 2. Still in Atlantic City, the Anipals attempt to "unstick" Triumph before his big show. Meanwhile, Doug tries to achieve weightlessness while dressed as an astronaut.: Great Leaders of History — A VH1 documentary parody that talks about George Washington as it claims that he fell into a deep depression and an addition to painkillers after becoming the first President of the United States, an intervention with a painful outcome, his friendship with Napoleon, his arrest for public nudity and battery of a small bear, and checking into the Betsy Ross Rehabilitation Center at Eisenhower. There are also interviews with Joe Walsh, Rick Nielsen, and George Washington himself.; The Baby, the Immigrant, and the Guy on Mushrooms — Artemis the Cat works to keep the clueless trio from getting into danger at an airport while his owner works to check to see if their seats are together on the airplane. Featuring the voices of Dale, Sarah Thyre, and Smigel.; The Safety Gang — An educational television show where four kids make up the titular group and talk about safety while interacting with Stranger Dan and keeping Wet Fingers and Outletta from playing too close to each other. They also claim that they "take a bullet for safety". Featuring Courtnie Beceiro, Morgan Billings, Matthew Bush, Phillip Miller, and David Roya.; A Michael Kupperman Cartoon Presents: Captain Marginal - A Captain Marvel parody where Billy Batsonsaws was a regular paperboy until he is talked into entering a magical cave where a powerful old man inside gives him special powers which he gains upon saying the word "Skrewpa" and will be turned into a hillbilly-themed superhero. Though the old man forgot what the acronym is due to being in the cave for too long. Featuring the voices of Robert Batttone, Doug Kleinman, and Henry Strozier.
8	8	"Chinese New Year's Day"	Unknown	January 24, 2001	108	N/A
The Anipals ditch the Funhouse to enter the lucrative, glamorous world of laboratory animal testing, as Doug celebrates Chinese New Year's Day and makes fireworks with a panda. The set was struck by detonating a puppet panda (full of innards for realism) on the set, splattering everywhere. Staged as a satirical accident, Doug replied with the word "Cut". Eventually, the Anipals reunite with an injured Doug. John Ritter guest stars as a speaker for Claredelon, the cosmetic company doing the animal testing.: Wonderman - After helping a woman (Ana Gasteyer) who tripped over a blind homeless man over a woman dangling from a window and a woman struggling with a purse snatcher, Wonderman (Smigel) hooks her up with his alias of Henry Moore who operates a dry cleaning business.; Nurture-You Mom & Dad - A commercial about full-sized dolls for the daughters of tired parents. There is even a version of "Nurture-You Mom & Dad" that wet themselves. Featuring Sara Kapner, Kevin Dorff, and Nin Nelson. Narrated by Jackie Maloof.; What Do We Know? - An educational show where a man (Bob Odenkirk) talks about a cactus, how much it rains in the Amazon rainforest, facts about Morocco, the Black Pyramid of Amenemhatt III, and the Himalayas. Also featuring Howard Kremer and Chip Pope.; A Michael Kupperman Cartoon Presents: Pablo Picasso: His Amazing Life - A documentary about Pablo Picasso where he would get into arguments with imaginary statues that follow him, frequently getting attacked by lions, driving around with a cartoon duck, and fairies rocking him while duck sang him to sleep. Featuring the voices of Robert Battone, Doug Kleinman, and Dino Stamatopoulos.

=== Cast ===
- Doug Dale - Doug

==== Anipal Voices ====
- Tommy Blacha — Hank
- Doug Dale — Jeffery
- Matt Davis
- Jon Glaser — Hojo
- Jonathan Groff
- Jackie Hoffman
- David Juskow — Larry
- Susan Krause
- Frank Simms
- Robert Smigel — Fogey, Xabu, Rocky, Terrence
- Brian Stack — Mr. Whiskers (first episode)
- Dino Stamatopoulos — Chickie, Mr. Whiskers
