= The Jack and Triumph Show =

- Genre: Sitcom
- Created by: Robert Smigel; Michael Koman; David Feldman
- Starring: Jack McBrayer; Robert Smigel; June Squibb
- Country of origin: United States
- Original language: English
- No. of seasons: 1
- No. of episodes: 7

Production
- Executive producers: Michael Koman; Robert Smigel; Jack McBrayer; Conan O'Brien; David Fieldman; Dino Stamatopoulos
- Camera setup: Multi-camera
- Running time: 22 minutes (TV); 28 minutes (online)
- Production companies: Poochie Doochie Productions; Universal Television; WDM Productions; Bomp Entertainment

Original release
- Network: Adult Swim
- Release: February 20 – April 3, 2015

The Jack and Triumph Show is a television sitcom from Universal Television for Adult Swim that premiered on February 20, 2015, and ended on April 3, 2015, with a total of 7 episodes. The live-action series was created by Robert Smigel, Michael Koman, and David Feldman.

The series features Jack McBrayer playing Jack Mlicki, the former child star of a fictional Lassie-like series. The puppet Triumph the Insult Comic Dog represents his co-star from that series.

The series was initially picked up for 20 episodes, but when only 7 episodes had aired, in August 2015 Dino Stamatopoulos confirmed that it would not be returning.

== Plot ==
The show is about two former child actors (Jack McBrayer and Triumph the Insult Comic Dog) who starred in a Lassie-like show from the 1980s and 1990s called Triumph's Boy. Jack had grown up playing the role of the small boy in the series even as he grew into adulthood. Though he is kind-hearted and optimistic, being a child actor had led to Jack being sheltered, naive, and socially awkward. After their show's cancellation, Jack and Triumph lived an indulgent and morally questionable lifestyle with the money they had made from the show. Jack discovers that his parents had squandered all his earnings, he and Triumph are forced into a life of thievery and prostitution.

This goes on until Jack decides to visit June Gregory, who played the role of his mother in Triumph's Boy. She agrees to take in both him and Triumph on the condition that Jack does not go back into acting and instead tries to get back on the straight and narrow path of a normal, Christian lifestyle. She grows ever more disdainful of Triumph, who continues to be a trouble-making nuisance, and eventually comes up with a plan to get rid of him. June arranges for Jack to go on a wilderness trip. Right after he leaves, she tells Triumph to get in the car because Pet Smart is having a sale on used kitty litter. She gives Triumph a handheld game to occupy him on the ride and drives to Montana, where she throws him into a ditch and abandons him. She gets home seconds before Jack returns from his trip and tells him that Triumph had left to get cigars and never came back. Over the course of 15 years, June helps teach Jack how to live a normal life while Triumph follows her scent back to her house, picking up many jobs along the way to sustain himself. Jack greets him warmly, but June fakes feeling ill and tells Jack to go get her medication. While Jack is upstairs, June and Triumph yell angrily at each other until they come to an agreement: Triumph will not tell Jack what June did to him as long as Triumph can stay and live with the two of them.

Triumph is dead-set on getting Jack and himself back into show business and resuming their life of stardom. June insists that Jack continues living his reformed, Christian lifestyle. Triumph often goes to drastic measures finding ways to get publicity and gain back the pair's stardom while trying to keep June from finding out. The result is that Triumph and June are attempting to pull Jack in opposite directions, and he essentially has no power over his own life as the two manipulate him.

== Cast ==
- Jack McBrayer as Jack Mlicki
- Robert Smigel as Triumph the Insult Comic Dog
- June Squibb as June Gregory
- Esther Ku as Tracy

== Episodes ==
No.	Title	Directed by	Written by	Original release date	Prod. code	US viewers (millions)
1	"Triumph Comes Home"	Thomas Kail	Michael Koman & Robert Smigel	February 20, 2015	104	1.72
Jack goes back into a flashback of his acting life. He also states that after the show was cancelled, he was in a funk. Meanwhile, Triumph comes back to reunite with Jack and the family. Guest starring: Michael Winslow, Tay Zonday, Brent Spiner, Hulk Hogan
2	"Coffee"	Linda Mendoza	David Feldman & Ben Joseph	February 27, 2015	TBA	1.35
Jack discovers his hidden talent of making coffee. Guest starring: Paul Rudd, Ezra Koenig
3	"Something Racist"	Linda Mendoza	Robert Smigel & Michael Koman & David Feldman	March 6, 2015	101	1.33
Guest starring: Tay Zonday, Leonard Maltin, Joey Fatone, Maury Povich
4	"Siri"	Lonny Price	Julie Klausner & Craig Rowin	March 13, 2015	TBA	1.41
Guest starring: Christopher Meloni, Joey Fatone, Vincent Pastore, and Susan Bennett as the voice of Siri
5	"Sorvino's Pants"	Thomas Kail	Story by : Michael Koman; Teleplay by : Dino Stamatopoulos	March 20, 2015	TBA	1.26
Guest starring: Cathy Moriarty-Gentile, Steve Schirripa, Paul Sorvino, Burt Young
6	"Dog House"	Lonny Price	Story by : Andy Breckman; Teleplay by : Andrew Weinberg	March 27, 2015	TBA	1.29
Guest starring: Caroline Rhea, Nadia Dajani, Joey Fatone, Vincent Pastore, Tay Zonday, Ben Curtis
7	"Commercial"	Linda Mendoza	Michael Koman & Robert Smigel & Ben Joseph	April 3, 2015	107	1.28
Guest starring: Alan Thicke, Ben Curtis, Lawrence O'Donnell

== See also ==
- Madame's Place
