= Black hound =

Black hound may refer to:

- Black dog (folklore), a mythological creature, also known as black hound
- Montenegrin Mountain Hound, a dog breed previously known as Black Hound
- Baldur's Gate III: The Black Hound, a cancelled video game
- Black hound, a monster in the role-playing game Advanced Dungeons & Dragons 2nd edition
- Hilda and the Black Hound, a novel in the graphic novel series Hilda
- "Chapter 13: The Black Hound", an episode of the television series Hilda
