= Śmigiel (surname) =

Śmigiel, Śmigieł, or Smigiel are Polish-language surnames. The Polish word śmigiel has several meanings ultimately derived from the verb śmigać, "to move swiftly".

Notable people with these surnames include:

- Brady Smigiel (born 2006), American football player
- Hanna Smigiel, the namesake of the minor planet 38020 Hannadam, a friend of the discoverer
- Krzysztof Śmigiel (born 1974), Polish volleyball player
- Michael D. Smigiel Sr. (1958–2022), American politician

== See also ==
- Schmiegel (disambiguation)
- Smigel
