= Samantha Scharff =

Television producer

Samantha Scharff is an American television producer and comedy writer. She is most recognized for her work producing Robert Smigel's "TV Funhouse" cartoons on NBC's “Saturday Night Live”. Scharff also produced the hour and a half special The Best Of Saturday TV Funhouse which aired during the SNL time slot and received critical acclaim, as well as the DVD title for Universal Home Video.

Scharff was responsible for bringing Stephen Colbert’s character Tek Jansen to life and produced the animated segments for “The Colbert Report” on Comedy Central. She produced Robert Smigel’s “TV Funhouse” series, which also aired on Comedy Central. She was the executive producer and writer for Stage Z, a 24-hour online event for Barry Diller’s IAC in collaboration with Live Earth 2007 which included eco segments with comedians such as Tina Fey, Amy Poehler, and more. Scharff was also the vision behind the animated PSA’s for Norman Lear’s Declare Yourself. She created and produced these videos for the “Get Out The Vote” campaign. They can be found on the web titled "Skool House Rock The Vote" and "Skool House Rock Sticker".

Presently, Scharff is the executive producer, creator, and writer for The Monkey Factory, an animated pilot for 20th Century FOX Studios featuring Kristen Wiig, Paul Scheer, Casey Wilson, Jason Nash, as an ensemble cast. Other work for FOX includes “Animals” which she produced for Robert Smigel and Happy Madison Productions, as well as a pilot Samantha is currently producing starring Kristen Bell titled “Maggie”.
