= Carl August Lebschée =

Polish-born German artist

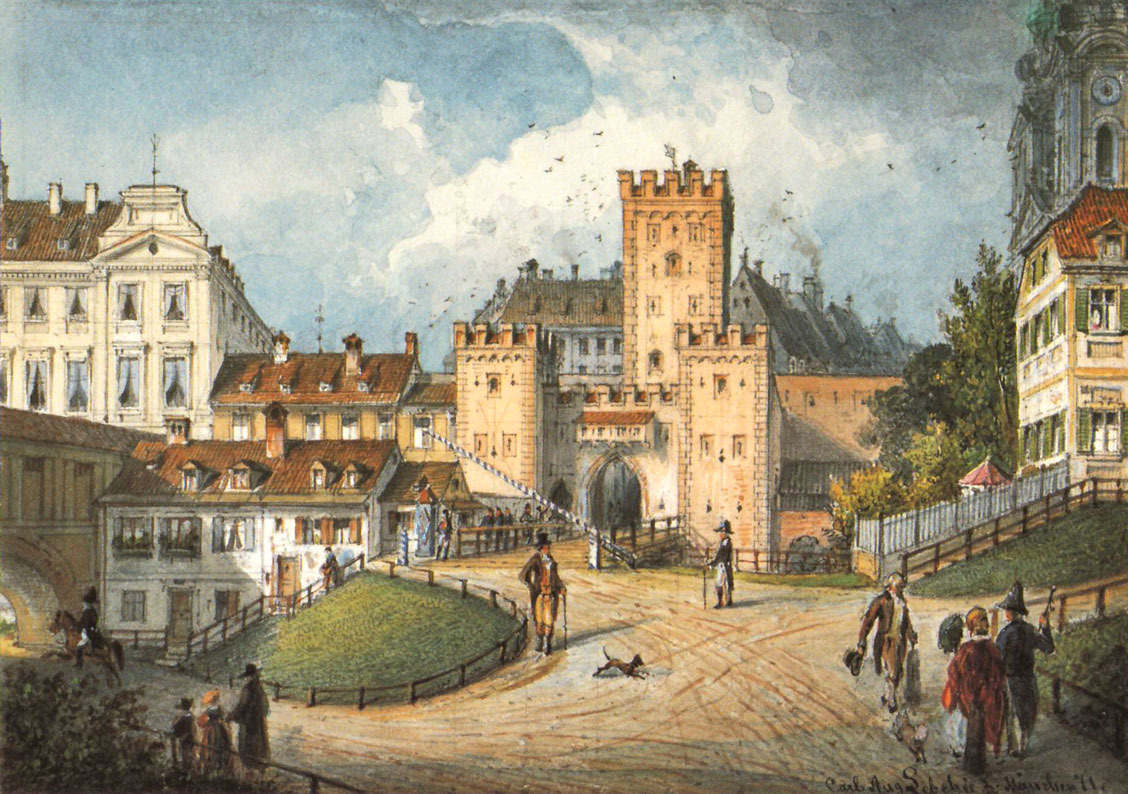
Schwabinger Tor in Munich, 1850

Carl August Lebschée (1800–1877) was a German painter, etcher, and lithographer, born at Schmiegel (modern Śmigiel), Poland. He studied at the Ludwig-Maximilians-Universität München in Munich, where his parents settled in 1807. He painted landscapes and architecture in oil and watercolours, and designed in the style of different masters. His etchings are executed with great spirit, and he signed with the initials C. L., or a monogram. He died in Munich.
