= Bill Jackson (television personality) =

American television personality (1935–2022)

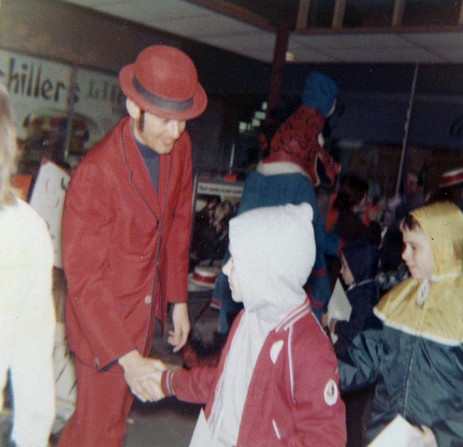
- Jackson greets viewers at a personal appearance at a Chicago area mall, 1969.
- Born: Bill Ray Jackson; September 15, 1935; Unionville, Missouri, U.S.
- Died: January 17, 2022 (aged 86); Paso Robles, California, U.S.
- Spouse: Jo
- Presenting career
- Show: Popeye and Little Rascals' Club; Mickey Mouse Club (local-Indianapolis); The Bill Jackson Show; Clown Alley; Here Comes Freckles; Cartoon Town; The BJ and Dirty Dragon Show; BJ's Bunch; Gigglesnort Hotel; Firehouse Follies
- Stations: KTVO; WLWI; WBBM-TV; WFLD; WGN-TV; WNBC-TV; WLS-TV

Bill Ray Jackson (September 15, 1935 – January 17, 2022) was an American television personality, cartoonist, puppeteer, puppet builder, and educator. He was best known for having hosted the children's programs The BJ and Dirty Dragon Show and Gigglesnort Hotel.

== Early life and career ==
Jackson was born in Unionville, Missouri. His father worked with a traveling carnival. He said he was very influenced by both comic strips and comic books, with Li'l Abner and Donald Duck being his favorites. Jackson graduated from the University of Missouri's school of journalism with a degree in television production in 1957, but did not get interested in puppetry until later.

His first broadcasting job was at KTVO in Ottumwa, Iowa, where he was a weatherman, copywriter and the station's art director. After a year at the station, Jackson joined the Army and was assigned to the Armed Forces Network in Hollywood. It was there that he created his first puppets.

His earliest appearance in children's television was in 1960 when he hosted a program in Fort Wayne, Indiana, called the Popeye and Little Rascals Club; this was broadcast for two years. The show was such a success that he moved on to Indianapolis for another three years with the Mickey Mouse Club on WLWI (now WTHR), later renamed The Bill Jackson Show, where he created his most enduring character, Dirty Dragon, based on a friend in Indianapolis.

== Chicago ==
Jackson's work attracted the attention of WBBM-TV in Chicago, which gave him a program in 1965, known variously as Clown Alley (weekday version) or Here Comes Freckles (Sunday morning version). This show broadcast for two seasons. Jackson played the title character, Freckles the Clown; although many of the puppet characters continued to appear on later series, Jackson usually played himself (or "B.J.", as his puppet co-stars called him) throughout the remainder of his career.

Jackson was then hired by another Chicago station, the then-independent WFLD, which was looking for a show to air opposite WGN-TV's highly popular Garfield Goose and Friends. Jackson responded in 1968 with a program initially called Cartoon Town based on the small town where he grew up. The show was later renamed The BJ and Dirty Dragon Show. Jackson, playing the mayor of the town, featured his existing puppet character, Dirty Dragon, as well as several new ones named "Weird", "Wally Goodscout", "Mother Plumtree", and "The Old Professor". Some of the new puppet characters were based on his former Unionville neighbors, while the character "Weird" was based on a Chicago friend. He also introduced a character called "Blob" which was made of clay and could, with Jackson's ad-hoc scultping, assume any form.

Jackson wrote and produced the show, performed all of the puppet characters' voices, and built and designed the sets and puppets. The show featured a variety of cartoons, including Underdog, Popeye (the early 1960s made-for-TV King Features version), "Out of the Inkwell" (the made-for-TV version produced by Hal Seeger) and George of the Jungle. The show was broadcast for five years on WFLD, but ended after the station's owner, Field Communications, sold an interest to Kaiser Broadcasting, and Kaiser reduced local productions on its group of stations. The final WFLD episode (#1311) was broadcast July 27, 1973; one month later, The BJ & Dirty Dragon Show (now in a new setting of "Carefree Corners") began a one-year run on WGN.

Meanwhile, Jackson began commuting between Chicago and New York, where he produced and hosted another local show, BJ's Bunch, featuring many of the same characters. By the fall of 1974, WGN cancelled The BJ & Dirty Dragon Show, after which Jackson produced a one-off holiday special, A Gift For Granny, which aired on WMAQ-TV, Chicago's NBC affiliate.

== Later career ==
Jackson and his puppets next appeared in the educationally-themed program Gigglesnort Hotel in 1975, which brought most of the old Cartoon Town characters back, plus a few new creations. Produced and broadcast by WLS-TV, Chicago's ABC affiliate, the show ran for three seasons. Jackson said his inspiration for the show was Fawlty Towers. Jackson then developed a program in 1979–1980, his last, called Firehouse Follies that featured his Gigglesnort Hotel characters. When the show was not picked up he left television to teach at California Institute of the Arts for the School of Film/Video for 12 years, retiring in 1990.

In a 2001 interview, Jackson expressed some frustration at seemingly not being able to fit into the criteria established for children's programming on network television. He said, "I am not "teachy" enough for PBS and am not considered worthy enough for Nickelodeon." At the end of its three-year run, Gigglesnort Hotel was syndicated nationally, and reruns continued to air on WLS in Chicago through 1985. Several episodes were released by Karl-Lorimar Home Video in the 1980s in a series of six volumes, one of which consisted of two holiday specials Jackson produced in California after he left Chicago: Billy Joe's Thanksgiving --aka Salute To The Turkey-- and a later remake of A Gift For Granny, which featured a green incarnation of Dirty Dragon and a female voice artist as Mother Plumtree.

In later years, Jackson continued living in California with his wife and started a website to sell DVDs of his old programs online. While his shows were on the air, Jackson received two Iris Awards for the best locally produced children's show in the United States, as well as local Emmys for the shows and his role in them.

In 2005, Jackson became a member of the Chicago chapter of the National Academy of Television Arts and Sciences Silver Circle. Ten years earlier, he had donated all his original puppets to Chicago's Museum of Broadcast Communications.

In 2008, he published a memoir called The Only Kid on the Carnival. In 2009, he produced a documentary, Remembering Cartoon Town and B.J. & Dirty Dragon. Jackson said in an interview when the DVD was released that many of the Cartoon Town episodes were not preserved. Jackson also appeared for a presentation for the Museum of Broadcast Communications, "Saturday Morning with B.J. and Dirty Dragon: Bill Jackson, Live in Person—One Last Time", in December 2009. He indicated this would be his last time appearing as a performer.

== Death ==
Jackson was hospitalized with COVID-19 shortly before his death, but was released. He died in Paso Robles, California, on January 17, 2022, at the age of 86. His official cause of death was not announced.

== General bibliography ==
- Hollis, Tim (2001). Hi There, Boys and Girls! America's Local Children's TV Programs. University Press of Mississippi. ISBN 978-1-578-06396-3 – via Project MUSE.
- Okuda, Ted; Mulqueen, Jack (2004). The Golden Age of Chicago Children's Television. Lake Claremont Press. ISBN 978-1-893-12117-1.
