= Triumph the Insult Comic Dog =

Puppet character best known for mocking celebrities

- First appearance: Late Night with Conan O'Brien (February 13, 1997)
- Created by: Robert Smigel
- Portrayed by: Robert Smigel

In-universe information
- Full name: Ch. Triumph's Honor of Whitehall
- Species: Dog (Montenegrin Mountain Hound) (Rottweiler)
- Gender: Male
- Occupation: Interviewer, Insult Comic Dog

Triumph the Insult Comic Dog is a puppet character created, puppeteered, and voiced by actor/comedian/director Robert Smigel. As his name indicates, Triumph's comedic style is almost exclusively insult comedy. A Rottweiler & Montenegrin Mountain Hound, Triumph often is seen with a cigar in his mouth, which usually falls out when he starts talking. He first appeared in 1997 on NBC's Late Night with Conan O'Brien, and also appeared on The Tonight Show with Conan O'Brien from time to time, as well as the short-lived TV Funhouse, TBS's Conan, Adult Swim's The Jack and Triumph Show, The Late Show with Stephen Colbert, The Daily Show, and Hollywood Squares. Smigel and Triumph have been ejected from several events for Triumph's antics, including the Westminster Kennel Club Dog Show, the Honolulu line for auditions for American Idol, and the 2004 Democratic National Convention (while shooting an aborted movie project).

== Creation and debut ==
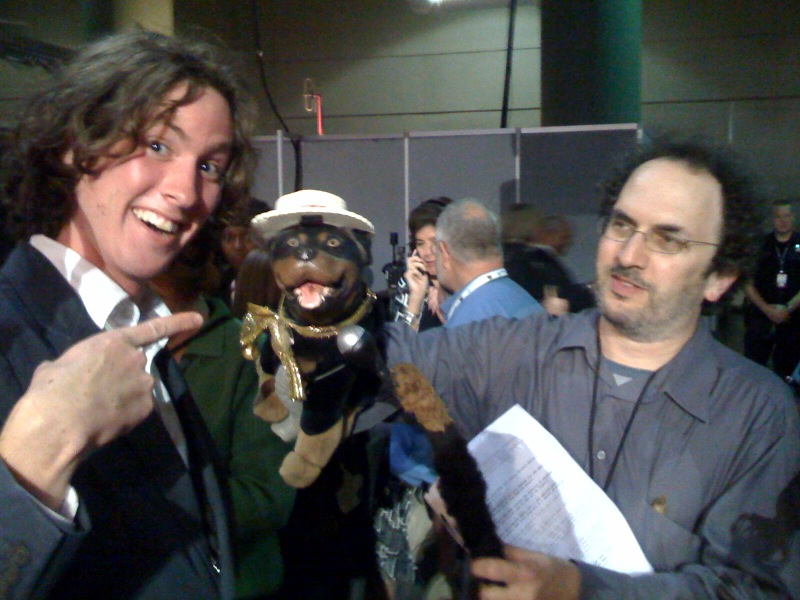
Robert Smigel (right) performing his puppet character, Triumph the Insult Comic Dog, at 2008 Republican National Convention with Associated Press production assistant (left)

The dog puppet was found, in an assortment of animal puppets, at a country furniture store, by Robert Smigel and his newlywed-wife, which Smigel used in-store to jokingly "smell" his newlywed-wife's rear end. She bought an assortment of seven of those animal puppets, and later presented them to Smigel as a birthday gift.

For four years, Late Night with Conan O'Brien had done remote segments parodying the Westminster Kennel Club Dog Show.

On February 13, 1997, Triumph, the character, created by Robert Smigel, was first used for a segment on Late Night with Conan O'Brien parodying the Westminster Kennel Club Dog Show, where Triumph (Ch. Triumph's Honor of Whitehall, Rottweiler, Yugoslavian Mountain Hound) appeared as a Westminster Kennel Club Dog Show winner (Hound division) in a vaudeville stage, with an Insult Comic talent, telling "for me to poop on" jokes later used in post-interview segments with ill-informed guests.

Triumph speaks with a nebulous Eastern European accent, which Smigel based on his grandparents who were immigrants from Russia.

Triumph first became a "viral video" at iFilm.

An early version of Triumph is currently on display at the Museum of Broadcast Communications in Chicago for the "Evolution of Late Night Television" exhibit.

== Notable appearances ==
=== Westminster Kennel Club Dog Show ===
In 1999, Jordan Schlansky and the Triumph entourage crashed the 123rd annual Westminster Kennel Club Dog Show at Madison Square Garden, New York City, and after some video shooting, were later ejected by security guards.

=== Star Wars ===
In May 2002, Triumph paid a visit to Star Wars fans lining up for the premiere of Star Wars: Episode II – Attack of the Clones outside the Ziegfeld Theater in New York, airing 2002-05-17, mocking their actions and stereotypical nerd culture. Notable moments include a wedding that took place at the line, and the appearances of Blackwolf the Dragonmaster (Richard Washington), a real-life fantasy gaming fan and the "Unofficial Wizard of New York", and a Spock lookalike who gave everyone the finger. Smigel has said "It's still the Triumph sketch I hear the most about and I'd say it's still the best. The simplest explanation is that it features the funniest straight men Triumph's ever encountered. So you're laughing not only at the jokes but the faces, the costumes and commitment [sic]. There's so much to enjoy."

=== Space Ghost Coast to Coast ===
In 2004, Triumph appeared as the guest star on the hit Adult Swim series Space Ghost Coast to Coast in the episode "Dreams". Triumph offhandedly mentions having anal sex with Lassie, which causes friction between Space Ghost and Moltar over such topics being brought up on television.

=== MTV Video Music Awards and incident with Eminem ===
In 2001 and 2002, Triumph appeared in the audience at the MTV Video Music Awards. In 2001, Triumph interviewed Carson Daly before spotting Jennifer Lopez and asking if he could sniff her butt.

In 2002, Triumph interviewed Moby before spotting Eminem, who covered Triumph with his hand, saying "I already got my TV time". Triumph was then shoved away by Eminem's bodyguards. The following day, Triumph appeared on Late Night with Conan O'Brien, and gave a press conference about the incident while wearing a neck brace. Triumph later appeared in Eminem's music video for "Ass Like That", and at the 2004 MTV Video Music Awards, Eminem began his performance by voicing a lookalike puppet.

=== 2004 presidential campaign ===
Triumph filmed a number of segments during the 2004 US presidential election cycle. In November 2003, in the early days of the 2004 U.S. presidential primary campaign, Triumph was the "lead guest" on The Tonight Show with Jay Leno the same night that Democratic candidate John Kerry also appeared on the show. Kerry made a dramatic entry, riding his Harley-Davidson motorcycle onto the stage; Triumph, in characteristic style, poked fun at him with a series of scathingly rude remarks, to Kerry's evident discomfort. (Among his jibes: "The poop I made in the dressing room had more heat than John Kerry!")

In July and August 2004, Triumph followed up with visits to both major parties' national conventions. During the Democratic National Convention in Boston (from which he was ejected), Triumph and Michael Moore attempted to crash Bill O'Reilly's set. O'Reilly shouted, "If I have to come out there, Insult Dog, you're gonna be talking a lot higher than you are now." He also gained entry to the Republican convention in New York, and even debated actor Ron Silver during the wrap-up on MSNBC.

=== 2008 presidential election ===
In September 2008, Triumph traveled to St. Paul, Minnesota to attend that year's Republican National Convention, where he filed a series of reports as he joked around with delegates inside the hall and protesters in the streets outside the convention. He also conducted a 6 1/2-minute interview (at a hotel across the street) with independent candidate Ralph Nader.

In October 2008, Triumph made an appearance at Hofstra University in Hempstead, New York during the final presidential debate between John McCain and Barack Obama. He interviewed and made jokes with political party supporters and with other members of the press, including the host of Fox News Channel's On the Record with Greta Van Susteren, making a surprise appearance on her show with Mr. Met, the mascot of the New York Mets.

=== SpongeBob SquarePants ===
In November 2009, Triumph was one of certain celebrities (along with Rosario Dawson, Eddie Deezen, LeBron James, Tina Fey, Will Ferrell, Craig Ferguson, Robin Williams, and Pink) in the SpongeBob SquarePants season 6 episode "Truth or Square". Tom Kenny's Patchy the Pirate made another attempt, this time to call the dog about guest starring on his 10th anniversary special, only for Triumph to insult his likeness (primarily referencing Jack Sparrow and Cap'n Crunch) and later hang up on him.

=== The Jack and Triumph Show ===
Triumph was a main character in the short-lived Adult Swim series The Jack and Triumph Show with Jack McBrayer and June Squibb. It premiered on February 20, 2015, and lasted until April 3, 2015.

=== 2016 and 2020 presidential elections ===
In February 2016, Triumph starred in Triumph's Election Special 2016, sponsored by Hulu and Funny or Die, traveling on the election trail. The program was nominated for an Emmy Award for Outstanding Writing for a Variety Special. In November 2016, after the election of Donald Trump as president, Triumph appeared on The Late Show with Stephen Colbert to discuss Trump's victory. In November 2018, Triumph covered the Texas Senate campaign between Ted Cruz and Beto O'Rourke for The Late Show. In February 2020, Triumph appeared on The Late Show to attempt to interview congresspeople during the first Trump impeachment trial. After holding up a sign behind Senator Lindsey Graham during a CNN interview, he was escorted out of the building before finishing the segment outside.

=== 2022 U.S. Capitol arrest ===
In June 2022, Smigel and six staffers from The Late Show with Stephen Colbert were arrested by the United States Capitol Police for an alleged unlawful entry in the Longworth House Office Building while filming a segment with Triumph during the January 6 attack hearings.

Federal prosecutors declined to follow up with charges as they had been invited inside, and their escorts had never asked them to leave the building.

=== 2024 election ===
In October 2024, Smigel appeared in the background of multiple crowd shots during the vice-presidential debate between Tim Walz and JD Vance. Two Triumph puppets were in use, dressed as Vance’s grandmother and WWE star Hulk Hogan. They were briefly interviewed by CNN’s Jake Tapper before the broadcast ended.

On October 27, 2024, Triumph interviewed attendees waiting to attend a Donald Trump rally at Madison Square Garden. At one point, he dons face paint and Viking horns to resemble Jacob Chansley. Triumph caps the segment with a crowd song parodying conservative sentiments.

Both incidents aired as correspondent pieces for The Daily Show.

Triumph reappeared at the People's March in Washington, D.C. in January 2025 as well as that year’s red carpet for the White House Correspondents dinner.

=== 2026 White House Correspondents' Dinner ===
Triumph appeared at the 2026 White House Correspondents' Dinner, and was interviewed by C-SPAN's John McArdle, shortly prior to the shooting that occurred at that event.

== Trademark lawsuit ==
In 1999, after Triumph accused Pets.com's sock puppet mascot of being a "rip-off" of Triumph on television shows, in print media, online, and in a letter, the company sent lawsuit threats and cease and desist letters to Smigel claiming "unfair competition, dilution and potentially tortious interference with contract in violation of federal and state laws" and the following year filed a lawsuit against Late Night and Smigel. The bankruptcy and closing of the company during the dot-com bust of 2000 ended the lawsuit. Triumph humped the Pets.com dog in a bathroom during a segment of Late Night as an act of revenge.

== Discography ==
Triumph's 2003 album, Come Poop with Me, was released by Warner Bros. Records, and featured adult comedy and songs, plus a bonus DVD of live performances by Triumph. The album was nominated for a Grammy Award for Best Comedy Album. Appearing with Triumph on the album and the DVD were singer-actor Jack Black, comedic actor Adam Sandler, Saturday Night Live cast members Maya Rudolph and Horatio Sanz; Blackwolf the Dragonmaster from the Star Wars skit; and Conan O'Brien. Notable songs include "I Keed", "Underage Bichon", "Lick Myself" and "Cats are Cunts".

On August 10, 2004, NBC released a DVD, Late Night with Conan O'Brien: The Best of Triumph, the Insult Comic Dog featuring select Triumph appearances from Late Night.

== See also ==
- Ed the Sock
- The Waldo Moment
