= Happy Happy Good Show =

American improv comedy revue

Happy Happy Good Show was an improvisational comedy revue held at the Victory Gardens Studio Theater in Chicago during the summer of 1988. The cast and writers were largely made up of writers on strike from Saturday Night Live after the 1987–1988 season. The show is most notable for showcasing the performance talents of Bob Odenkirk, Robert Smigel, and Conan O'Brien, as the three had previously only showcased their writing talents. The revue was directed by Mark Nutter.

Video clips of Happy Happy Good Show were shown on Late Night with Conan O'Brien in 2006, when the program was taped for a week in Chicago.

== Cast ==
- Conan O'Brien
- Bob Odenkirk
- Robert Smigel
- Rose Abdoo
- Doug Dale
- Hugh Callaly
- Debby Jennings
- David Reynolds
- Jill Talley
- with Joe E. Dale

== Reviews ==
A review of the show in the Chicago Tribune was fairly negative, stating that "most of the skits in this show fall flat, underdeveloped and incomplete, little more, really, than blueprint works-in-progress."

== Notable sketches ==
Several of the sketches are clear progenitors of sketches in other media worked on by the writers.

- A sketch set at a nude beach where genitalia are strategically blocked by furniture is very similar to the famous "Nude Beach" sketch that aired on Saturday Night Live during the 1988–1989 season.
- A sketch in which the cast would make outlandish predictions for the future is thematically similar to Late Night with Conan O'Brien's recurring In the Year 2000 sketch.
- A sketch called "Chicago Superfans" about Chicago residents whose conversations would invariably turn back into a discussion of the Chicago Bulls or Chicago Bears. This sketch would eventually become Bill Swerski's Superfans on Saturday Night Live.
