= American Society for Dental Aesthetics =

- Abbreviation: ASDA
- Formation: 1977
- Type: Professional Society
- Headquarters: New York, NY, USA
- Founder: Dr. Irwin Smigel
- Website: www.asdatoday.org

The American Society for Dental Aesthetics was founded in 1977 by current President, Dr. Irwin Smigel. It is an international nonprofit organization whose aim is to increase awareness of dental aesthetics and treatment options and thereby enhance the quality of patient care in dentistry.

== Events ==
The organization annually presents a multi-day educational conference in a chosen US city. The conference consists of lectures and participation workshops taught by cosmetic dentists and educators to further the organizations educational goal.

== Membership ==
The following requirements must be met to become a member:

- A minimum of five years in dental practice, or postgraduate training of two years in an approved program.
- Attendance to at least two ASDA sponsored continuing dental education seminars.
- Nomination by a member accompanied by two letters of recommendation by Society members.
- Presentation of five (5) cases illustrating the concepts of aesthetic dentistry.
- Nominees must complete an application form affixed with a copy of their curriculum vitae.
- A requirement for continued membership is attendance of at least one ASDA continuing education dental meeting every other year.
