= David Juskow =

American comedian, writer and actor

- Born: New Brunswick, New Jersey

Comedy career
- Medium: Comedy, writing, film, television
- Genres: Satire, political satire, sketch comedy, observational comedy, black comedy, blue comedy
- Subjects: American politics, American culture, current events, mass media, news media, pop culture

David Juskow (sometimes credited as Dave Juskow) is an American comedian, writer and actor. He is perhaps best known for such televisions shows and films as Men of a Certain Age, Dr. Katz, Professional Therapist, TV Funhouse, The Sarah Silverman Program, The Wrestler, and HBO's Crashing.

Juskow was also a commentator for The Huffington Post, and hosts the podcast, And Juskow For All. He is also the author of the book, John Hughes: Film by Film
