= Wilhelm Salomon Freund =

German lawyer and politician (1831–1915)

Wilhelm Salomon Freund (January 27, 1831– June 4, 1915) was a Jewish German lawyer and politician.

Freund was born in Schmiegel (Śmigiel) in the Province of Posen. He received his law degree from the University of Breslau (Wrocław). He served as a member of the Prussian House of Deputies from 1876 to 1879 and a member of the Reichstag from 1879 to 1881. He died in Breslau.
