= Lookwell =

American television pilot

- Title screen featuring Adam West
- Created by: Conan O'Brien; Robert Smigel
- Written by: Conan O'Brien; Robert Smigel
- Directed by: E. W. Swackhamer
- Starring: Adam West; Ron Frazier; Todd Field; Bart Braverman; Brian Bradley
- Composer: Jack Elliott
- Country of origin: United States
- No. of episodes: 1

Production
- Executive producer: Lorne Michaels
- Producers: Conan O'Brien; Robert Smigel; Ron Frazier
- Running time: 22 minutes
- Production company: Broadway Video

Original release
- Network: NBC
- Release: July 28, 1991

Lookwell is a television pilot written and produced by Conan O'Brien and Robert Smigel, the latter of whom would become a primary creative voice for O'Brien's late night show. It starred Adam West. Despite being a "personal favorite" of NBC chairman Brandon Tartikoff (who had left that position by the time the pilot aired and was replaced by Warren Littlefield), the pilot was not picked up as a series. It was broadcast on NBC on July 28, 1991, in a summer weekend timeslot reserved for burning off pilots which the network had passed on.

== Plot ==
A washed-up TV action hero—who at the peak of his career was ceremonially deputized by local law enforcement—falsely believes he can solve crimes in real life. His student Jason becomes his sidekick.

== Cast ==
- Adam West as Ty Lookwell
- Todd Field as Jason
- Ron Frazier as Detective Kennery
- Ann Weldon as Hyacinth
- Bart Braverman as Alberti
- Deborah Richter as Miss Royster
- Brian Bradley as Alex
- Jeff Austin as Desk Sergeant
- Chris Barnes as Rental Agent
- John Capodice as Phil
- Molly Cleator as Casting Director
- Brixton Karnes as Actor #2
- Sal Lopez as Manny
- John Riggi as Ben
- Steve Schubert as Policeman #1
- Audree Chapman as Receptionist
- Sip Culler as Pimp
- Tom Dahlgren as Partygoer
- Jack Yates as Racing Official
- Ami Rothschild as Suzanne
- Stephen Prutting as Doorman
- Rif Hutton as Policeman #2
- Michael Milhoan as Policeman #3
- Terry Beaver as ???
- Daniel Roebuck as Cop (uncredited)

== Production ==
=== Development ===
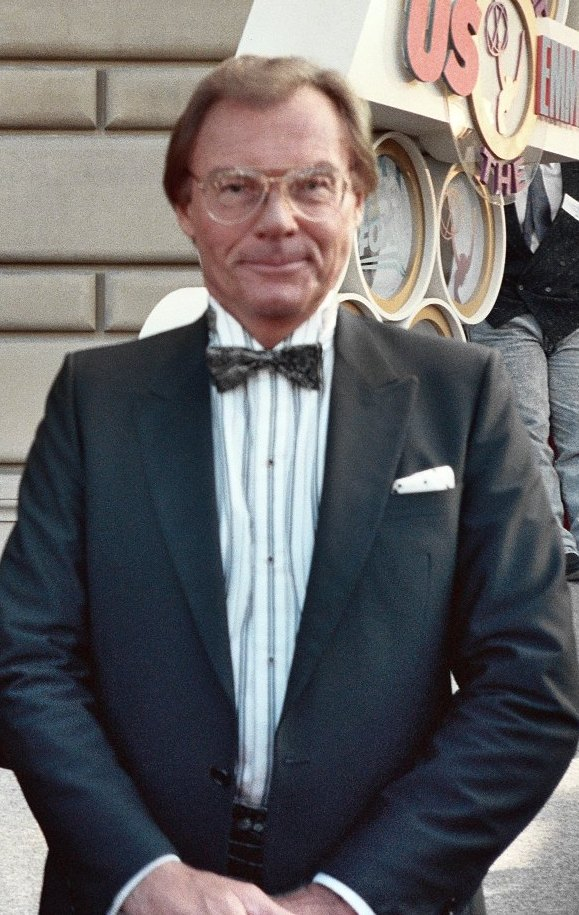
Adam West was enthusiastic for the part of protagonist Ty Lookwell

The pilot was filmed as a single-camera comedy, which was uncommon for the time it was being developed. Writer Robert Smigel later expressed doubt that the project could sustain itself as a full-fledged television series, questioning if "viewers would really want to view that every week? I'm not so sure they would have."

Smigel recollects main star Adam West being enthusiastic for the role, despite poking fun at his acting style:

I remember one day he ran into our office, and he was wearing shorts and a straw hat—but not as a gag. [...] And he announced, "I've got it!" He was dancing on air. He told us that he had been walking on the beach and he'd thought about everything and he finally understood the part. He had cracked the code, kind of like Batman would. He knew exactly what we wanted to do and he was exuberant. He was like a kid.

— Robert Smigel, And Here's the Kicker: Conversations with 21 Top Humor Writers on Their Craft, p. 255

=== Initial reception ===
The pilot was scrapped, despite NBC chairman Brandon Tartikoff taking interest in developing the pilot. O'Brien jokingly stated that when the pilot aired, it "was the second-lowest rated television show of all time. It’s tied with a test pattern they show in Nova Scotia." Nielsen rated it 92nd out of 92 shows (2.3 million homes) for the week July 22–28.

Smigel expressed his opinion on pitching for television in an interview with The A.V. Club, in that a "pitfall that you always face when you do any project for television, or in movies ... [is that] if it takes any amount of time to develop, there's a good chance that the person who put it in motion is going to get fired, or quit, and the next person isn't going to want to do it." West expressed disappointment with the network's decision, and would bring up resurrecting the pilot over the years. In an interview with Seattle Post-Intelligencer, West said that he has done "like 12 pilots, and Lookwell is really my favorite ... It’s the funniest pilot that never got sold."

== Cult status ==
The episode has been described as having an "underground following" over the years, and was popular on eBay for a time before being made available as a video file, due in part to the resurgence of cult popularity for Adam West. The version in general circulation on the Internet is not the original as-aired episode. It comes from a later showing on Trio (a cable station) which, for unknown reasons, has a few cuts and a few alternate jokes/takes inserted. One major difference may be due to music rights issues. A version of the original episode as aired on NBC was known to be circulated by tape traders. However, due to the age, high-quality copies are difficult to find.

In a 2016 appearance on late night talk show Conan, actor and comedian Jack Black stated that Conan was "one of the most kick ass writers in Hollywood" and encouraged the audience to check out Lookwell because "it was funniest thing ever".

According to The A.V. Club, "Lookwell has since earned a reputation in comedy circles as one of the all-time great failed pilots, a brilliant premise too damn weird to ever make it to series."

== Live screenings ==
Smigel's preferred version of Lookwell (with Adam West busting through the police tape at the beginning) has also screened at The Other Network, a festival of un-aired TV pilots, featuring live and taped intros by Smigel and an extended interview with O'Brien, produced by Un-Cabaret.
