= Schmiegel (disambiguation) =

Schmiegel is the former German name of Śmigiel, a town in Poland.

Schmiegel may also refer to:

- Kreis Schmiegel, a former German kreis (county) with the seat at Schmiegel
- Klaus Schmiegel (born 1939), organic chemist, inventor of prozac

== See also ==
- Smigel
- Śmigiel (disambiguation)
