= Smigel =

Smigel is a surname. Notable people with the surname include:

- Irwin Smigel (1924–2016), American dentist
- Robert Smigel (born 1960), American actor, writer, and director

== See also ==
- Śmigiel (disambiguation)
- Schmiegel (disambiguation)
