= The BJ and Dirty Dragon Show =

Chicago children's television series (1968–1974)

- Host Bill Jackson with Dirty Dragon and other cast members
- Also known as: Cartoon Town; BJ's Bunch
- Genre: Children's program
- Created by: Bill Jackson
- Country of origin: United States
- Original language: English
- No. of episodes: 1.311

Original release
- Network: WFLD; WGN-TV; WNBC-TV (as BJ's Bunch)
- Release: 1968 – 1974

The BJ and Dirty Dragon Show (also called Cartoon Town) is a Chicago children's television program that aired on WFLD and later WGN-TV from 1968 to 1974. It starred Bill Jackson (the BJ of the title) and his puppets.

== WFLD and WGN-TV ==
Jackson had a program called Clown Alley on WBBM-TV which though critically praised did poorly in the ratings due to an early morning time slot. However, officials at WFLD, then an independent station, were impressed enough to offer Jackson a time slot opposite WGN's popular Garfield Goose and Friends. While Jackson had portrayed a fictional character (Freckles the Clown) on Clown Alley (and its Sunday morning sister program, Here Comes Freckles), for the new show, Cartoon Town with Bill Jackson (later retitled The BJ & Dirty Dragon Show), Jackson appeared as himself. Jackson brought along many of his puppets from Clown Alley, including the most popular, Dirty Dragon, a gruff creature who snorted smoke and who was based on an old co-worker of Jackson's in Indianapolis.

The premise of the show was that Jackson was the mayor of the fictional Cartoon Town and the puppets were all residents of the town. Dirty Dragon was the postmaster, but ended up eating most of the mail. A large blob of clay called the Blob was the town monument; he spoke in a strange distorted voice only Jackson could understand. Jackson would, at the Blob's request, manipulate him into whatever seemed appropriate that day.

The show is credited with helping to spur the market for UHF-compatible televisions in the Chicago area. However, Cartoon Town faced tough competition from WGN-Channel 9, leading Jackson to alter the show's format in the fall of 1971, when the show was moved to a noon timeslot (opposite WGN-TV's Bozo's Circus), retitled The BJ & Dirty Dragon Show, and received a format overhaul with a live studio audience and the former puppet characters performed by full-size costumed actors. This version of the show adopted the format of Jackson's successful outside live performances, but the concept was less successful on television than in an in-person theatre setting, and before long, the show returned to its original format (though retaining the new title). Jackson and his producer both were awarded local Emmys for their work on the show for the season live actors were used. The BJ & Dirty Dragon Show last aired on WFLD July 27, 1973, after 1,311 episodes. The following month, the show moved to WGN-TV Channel 9 for a one-year run, ending in August 1974. During this time, Jackson commuted between Chicago and New York City, also performing a version of the show called BJ's Bunch for WNBC. Subsequently, Jackson used the show's characters in a one-shot holiday special, A Gift For Granny, which aired on Chicago's NBC affiliate, WMAQ-Channel 5, in December 1974. (A later version of A Gift For Granny, produced by Jackson in Los Angeles in the early 1980s, was later released on VHS by Karl-Lorimar Home Video.).

== Gigglesnort Hotel-WLS-TV ==
In January 1975, WLS-TV Channel 7 (Chicago's ABC affiliate) picked up the show as a weekly Sunday morning series, with another revised format, under the new title, Gigglesnort Hotel. Jackson developed this incarnation as an educational series to fulfill FCC requirements, casting himself as the hotel's desk clerk, with "B.J." and the rest of his puppet cast appearing as either employees or guests at the hotel owned and operated by new character Captain Gigglesnort. Gigglesnort Hotel ran for three years, with 78 half-hour episodes produced. The series was syndicated nationally, and seven volumes of episodes were released on VHS by Karl-Lorimar Home Video in the 1980s. in the 1978–79 season, Jackson did "The Too Late Show staring Dirty Dragon", a slight take off on Johnny Carson's Tonight Show, as a local Featurette during ABC-TV's Kids Are People Too, also on WLS-TV.

Jackson's final Chicago TV series was another WLS production, Firehouse Follies, which followed a similar format and ran for 13 episodes in 1980. WLS-TV aired each episode twice, before returning to reruns of Gigglesnort Hotel, which continued to air Saturday and Sunday mornings through 1985. In 1995, Jackson donated the show's puppets to the Museum of Broadcast Communications.

== Retirement ==
Still a Chicago favorite, he appeared for a presentation for the Museum of Broadcast Communications, "Saturday Morning with B.J. and Dirty Dragon: Bill Jackson, Live in Person—One Last Time", in December 2009. The performance was sold out quickly; Jackson, who also received two Iris Awards for the best locally produced children's show in the United States, said this would be his last time appearing as a performer.

== General bibliography ==
- Hollis, Tim (2001). Hi There, Boys and Girls! America's Local Children's TV Programs. University Press of Mississippi. ISBN 978-1-578-06396-3. via Project MUSE (subscription required)
- Okuda, Ted; Mulqueen, Jack (2004). The Golden Age of Chicago Children's Television. Lake Claremont Press. ISBN 978-1-893-12117-1.
