= Gigglesnort Hotel =

Television series

- Desk clerk Bill Jackson and Dirty Dragon at the front desk of the Gigglesnort Hotel
- Genre: Children's program
- Created by: Bill Jackson
- Country of origin: United States
- Original language: English

Original release
- Network: WLS-TV
- Release: 1975 – 1978

Gigglesnort Hotel is an American syndicated children's television program which ran for 78 episodes between 1975 and 1978. It was hosted by Bill Jackson, previously the host of several Chicago-based children's programs including Clown Alley and The BJ and Dirty Dragon Show. The program was set, as the title implies, at an old hotel, where Jackson's role was a desk clerk. The program featured many of the characters from the previous show, including Dirty Dragon, the Old Professor, Weird the Bellhop, Old Mother Plumtree, and several others who were created just for the program, such as the hotel's owner, Old Man Captain Gigglesnort.

The show was widely praised by critics, and it became one of the highest-rated children's shows in WLS-TV history. It was syndicated in 1978, airing in several markets nationwide as well as Canada, Italy, and Saudi Arabia.

Jackson made a final appearance for a presentation for the Museum of Broadcast Communications, "Saturday Morning with B.J. and Dirty Dragon: Bill Jackson, Live in Person—One Last Time", in December 2009, saying this would be his last time appearing as a performer. In 1995, he donated all his original puppets to Chicago's Museum of Broadcast Communications.

== Bibliography ==
- Hollis, Tim (2001). Hi There, Boys and Girls! America's Local Children's TV Programs. University Press of Mississippi. ISBN 978-1-578-06396-3. via Project MUSE (subscription required)
- Okuda, Ted; Mulqueen, Jack (2004). The Golden Age of Chicago Children's Television. Lake Claremont Press. ISBN 978-1-893-12117-1.
