= Irwin Smigel =

American dentist (1924–2016)

- Born: Irwin Elliot Smigel; October 9, 1924; Manhattan, New York City, U.S.
- Died: October 17, 2016 (aged 92); Manhattan, New York
- Occupations: Dental surgeon, innovator
- Known for: Dental surgery
- Spouse: Lucia Smigel
- Children: 2, including Robert
- Website: www.smigel.com

Irwin Elliot Smigel (October 9, 1924 – October 17, 2016) was an American aesthetic dentist, innovator and philanthropist.

== Biography ==
Smigel, who was Jewish, founded the American Society for Dental Aesthetics (ASDA), and was President of the ASDA until his death in 2016. Smigel was involved with many major developments in dentistry in the 20th century, including: tooth bonding, laminates, veneers, changing facial structures and teeth whitening. The New York University College of Dentistry dubbed him "The Father of Aesthetic Dentistry" in 2000. In 2009, The National Museum of Dentistry, an affiliate of the Smithsonian Institution, created a permanent exhibition called The Smile Experience celebrating Dr. Smigel's contributions to dentistry.

Smigel and his wife, Lucia Smigel, have two children, the writer/comedian Robert Smigel and Bellanca Smigel Rutter, and six grandsons. He died in Manhattan from pneumonia on October 17, 2016.

== Career ==
Smigel graduated from the New York University College of Dentistry in 1950. In the late 1970s Smigel appeared on ABC's That’s Incredible! where he performed "live" tooth-bonding on a patient for the first time on national television. He was called the "pioneer of tooth-bonding" on that show.

=== Later years ===
Smigel practiced on Madison Avenue in New York City and was a visiting lecturer for several postgraduate aesthetic dentistry programs, including the University of Minnesota Dental School, SUNY School of Dentistry – Buffalo, University of Missouri Dental School, Case Western University and the Baylor University School of Dentistry. He lectured throughout the country to practicing dentists and worldwide in countries including India, Korea, Israel, Turkey, Japan, South America, Canada. The Irwin and Lucia Smigel Fund was created to allow young professional actors and performers who could not afford aesthetic dentistry to obtain this type of dental work at The New York University College of Dentistry.

== Publications ==
- Smigel, Irwin (1979). Dental Health/Dental Beauty. M. Evans. p. 275. ISBN 978-0-87131-284-6.

Numerous articles in Dentistry Today and many other dental trade journals.

== Honors ==
American Academy of Cosmetic Dentistry, 1994: Outstanding Contribution to Aesthetic Dentistry Award.

New York University College of Dentistry creation of the Irwin Smigel Prize in Aesthetic Dentistry presented to dentists for outstanding contributions to the world of aesthetic dentistry.

In June 2009, the National Museum of Dentistry, an affiliate of the Smithsonian Institution, honored Smigel in a new historical exhibition called The Smile Experience.
