= Władysław Śmigielski =

Polish field hockey player

Personal information
- Nationality: Polish
- Born: 23 June 1937 Poznań, Poland
- Died: 19 June 1995 (aged 57) Poznań, Poland

Sport
- Sport: Field hockey

Władysław Śmigielski (23 June 1937 – 19 June 1995) was a Polish field hockey player. He competed in the men's tournament at the 1960 Summer Olympics.
