= Doug Dale =

American actor and comedian

Douglas Dale is an American actor and comedian born in Barrington, Illinois.

== Career ==
Dale is best known for hosting the Saturday Night Live spinoff series on Comedy Central titled TV Funhouse, which was written and directed by Robert Smigel. He originally met Smigel when they were roommates in Chicago. They were creators and cast members of the comedy group All You Can Eat. Their biggest success with that group was the show "All You Can Eat and the Temple of Doom".

Dale was also involved in the Happy Happy Good Show, a Chicago sketch show featuring Robert Smigel, Bob Odenkirk and Conan O'Brien. Dale was also seen on the series Murphy Brown and Who's the Boss?, and during the early 1990s he appeared in various sketches on Late Night with Conan O'Brien, most notably as the "Guy Next Door." He also appeared on Saturday Night Live as various voices from the TV Funhouse cartoons, and more recently, he did voice-overs for Hotel Transylvania.

In addition to acting, Dale is Vice President of All Children's Theatre in Parsippany, New Jersey. There he teaches children stage performance, ranging from stand-up to musical theatre.
