= Krzysztof Śmigiel =

Polish volleyball player (born 1974)

Personal information
- Nationality: Polish
- Born: 6 May 1974 (age 50); Szczecin, Poland

Sport
- Sport: Volleyball

Krzysztof Śmigiel (born 6 May 1974) is a Polish volleyball player. He competed in the men's tournament at the 1996 Summer Olympics.
