= Ben Curtis (actor) =

American actor

- Occupation: Actor
- Years active: 2000–present

Ben Curtis is an American actor who became known for saying "Dude, you're getting a Dell!" in a series of television commercials advertising Dell computers between 2000 and 2003.

== Career ==
=== Dell commercials ===
As part of a commercial advertising campaign, Curtis portrayed the character Steven. The commercials would usually feature Steven informing someone of all the perks of owning a Dell. When the person was sold on the idea, Steven would close with the catchphrase "Dude, you're getting a Dell!" The campaign was a success and brought prominence to Dell and to Curtis.

Curtis's tenure with Dell ended shortly after he was arrested and accused of buying a bag of marijuana in 2003. According to Curtis, he was blacklisted from the entertainment community, and it was difficult for him to find work.

=== Later career ===
In 2005, Curtis played the role of Christian in the Off-Broadway comedy Joy by John Fisher. The show ran at the Actors' Playhouse in Manhattan's West Village from August 14 to September 25.

== Filmography ==
=== Film ===
Year	Title	Role	Notes
2007	Rapturious	Specter	
2009	Echelon 8	Richard	
2011	Spy	Jonathan Looke	Also associate producer
2011	We Are the Hartmans	Jordan	Also co-producer
2017	Beauty Mark	Billy	

=== Television ===
Year	Title	Role	Notes
2007	Law & Order	Robert Cole	Episode: "Over Here"
2009	Mercy	Core Doctor	5 episodes
2013	Method or Madness	Adam	Episode: "The Actors Support Group"
2013–2018	What Would You Do?	Various roles	12 episodes
2015	The Jack and Triumph Show	Dell Dude	2 episodes
2015	Chasing Life	Jared	Episode: "The Age of Consent"
2016	I Love You... But I Lied	Tommy	Episode: "Addicted"
2017–2018	John the Thief	Arvid Cranston	5 episodes
2018	Orange Is the New Black	Mr. Sprang	Episode: "Changing Winds"
2018	The Marvelous Mrs. Maisel	Waylon Jones	Episode: "Vote for Kennedy, Vote for Kennedy"

=== Video games ===
Year	Title	Role
2006	Bully	Damon West
2008	Midnight Club: Los Angeles	Joe
2009	Grand Theft Auto: The Ballad of Gay Tony	The People of Liberty City / Conspire Caller
2013	Grand Theft Auto V	The Local Population
