= Śmigiel =

Town in Greater Poland Voivodeship, Poland

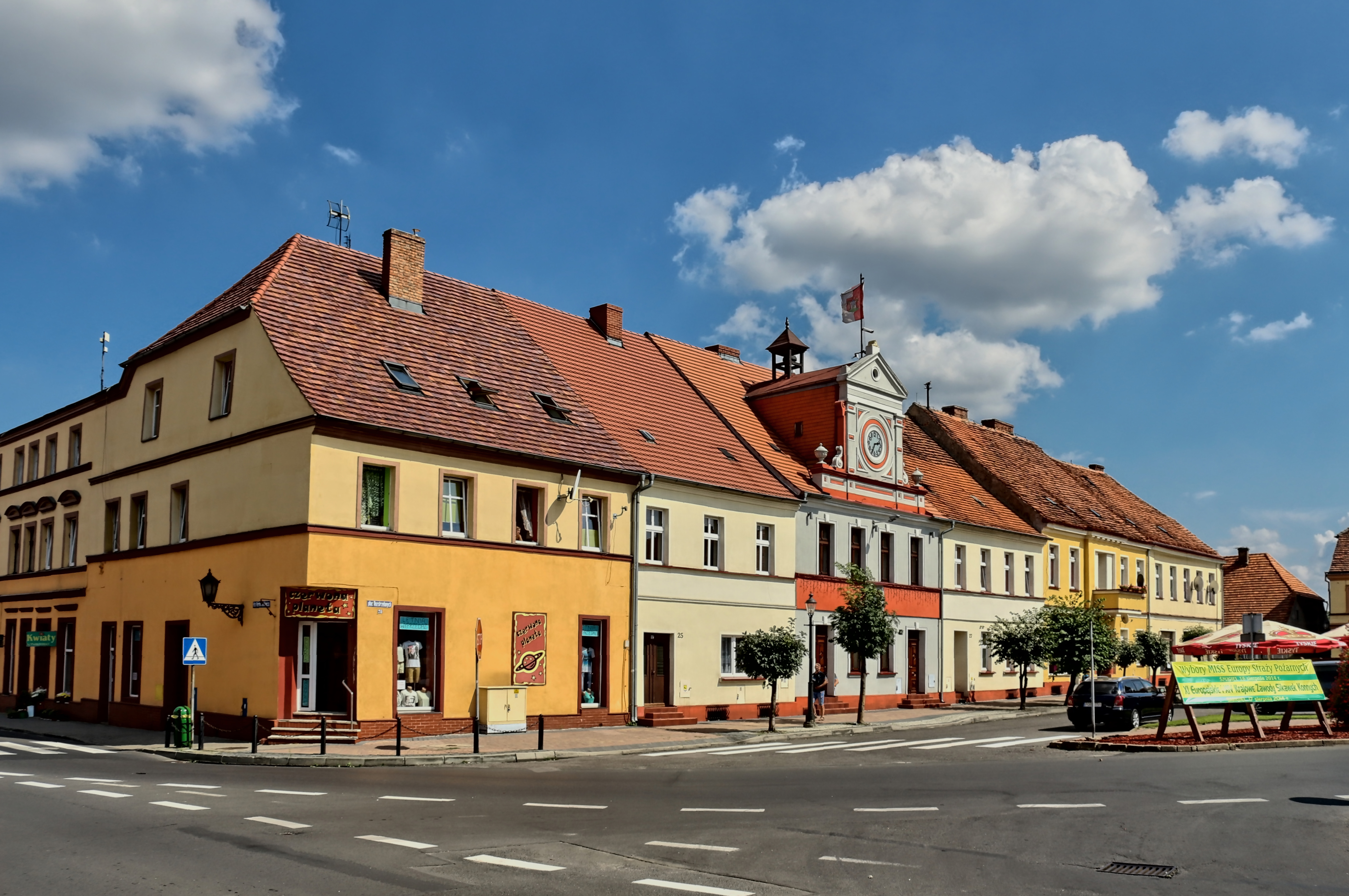
- Old houses at Plac Rozstrzelanych in Śmigiel

- Flag Coat of arms

- Location within Poland
- Coordinates: 52°0′33″N 16°31′7″E
- Country: Poland
- Voivodeship: Greater Poland
- County: Kościan
- Gmina: Śmigiel

Area
  - Total: 5.2 km^{2} (2.0 sq mi)

Population (2010)
  - Total: 5,536
  - Density: 1,100/km^{2} (2,800/sq mi)
- Time zone: UTC+1 (CET)
  - Summer (DST): UTC+2 (CEST)
- Postal code: 64-030
- Vehicle registration: PKS
- Website: https://www.smigiel.pl

Śmigiel (Polish pronunciation: [ˈɕmiɡʲɛl]) is a town in Kościan County, Greater Poland Voivodeship, Poland, with 5,536 inhabitants (2010).

== History ==
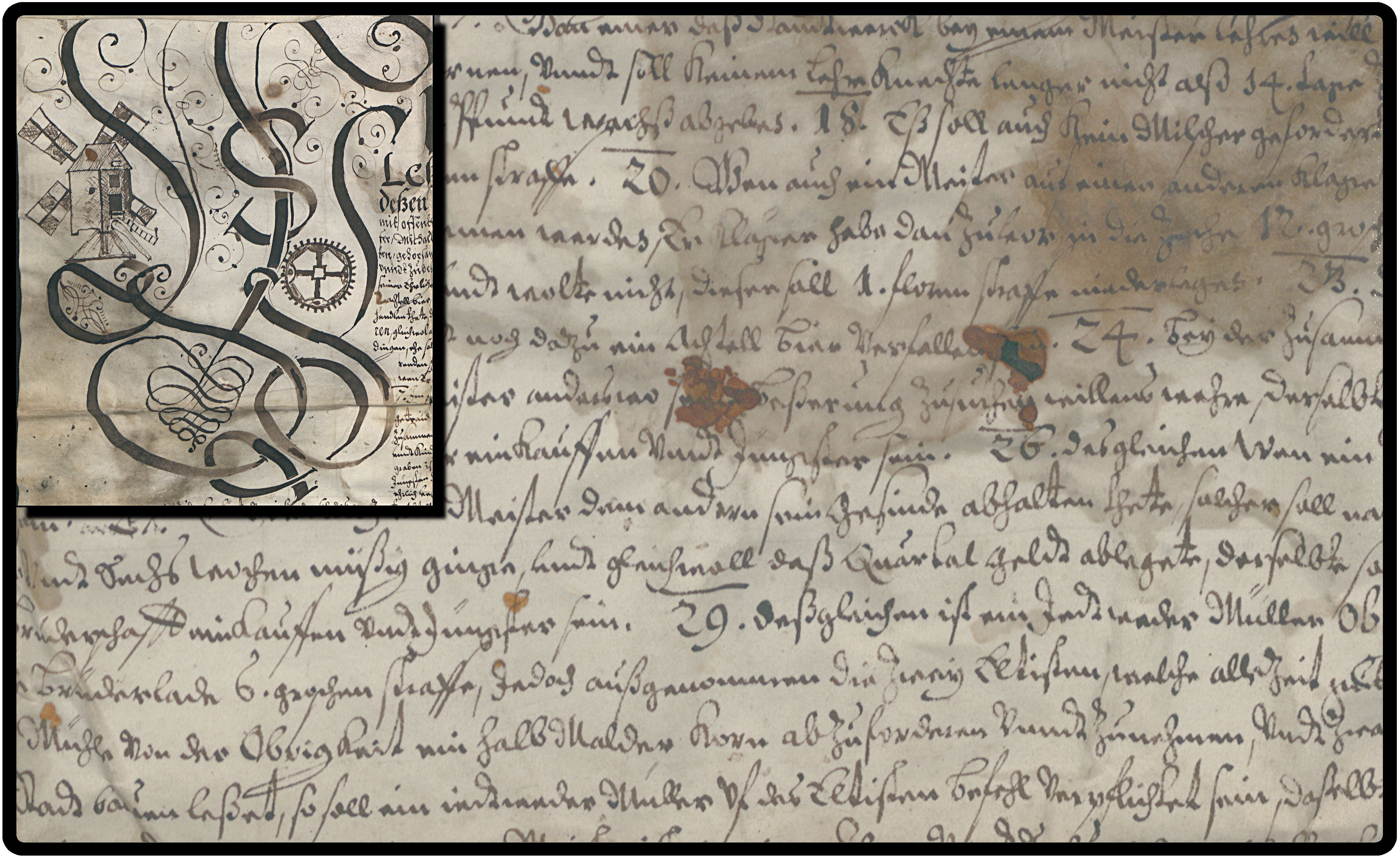
Guild document from Śmigiel from 1644

Śmigiel was granted town rights in 1415 or perhaps earlier. It was a private town of Polish nobility, administratively located in the Kościan County in the Poznań Voivodeship in the Greater Poland Province. It was annexed by Prussia in the Second Partition of Poland in 1793. After the successful Greater Poland uprising of 1806, it was regained by Poles and included within the short-lived Duchy of Warsaw. It was re-annexed by Prussia in 1815, and included within Germany in 1871. While part of Prussia and Germany, the town was administered within Kreis Schmiegel in the Grand Duchy of Posen/Province of Posen. As Poland regained independence following World War I in 1918, the town was reintegrated with Poland, and local Poles joined the Greater Poland Uprising (1918–19), which aim was to reintegrate the entire region of Greater Poland with the reborn state. Among the insurgents were future mayors Władysław Pioch and Maksymilian Stachowiak. Władysław Pioch co-organized the local Polish administration.

During the joint German-Soviet invasion of Poland, which started World War II in September 1939, the town was captured by Germany after a Polish defense, co-organized by the local mayor Władysław Pioch. In the following weeks, on September 30 and October 23, 1939, the German Einsatzgruppe VI carried out two public executions of Poles, killing 8 and 15 people respectively. Among the victims were pre-way mayors Władysław Pioch and Maksymilian Stachowiak, local Polish activists, intelligentsia and former insurgents of the Greater Poland Uprising. Polish craftsmen and merchants from Śmigiel were also among 45 Poles murdered by the Germans on November 7, 1939 in the forest near Kościan. In 1940, Germany expelled 500 Poles to the General Government (German-occupied central Poland), and their houses were handed over to German colonists as part of the Lebensraum policy. Also a transit camp for Poles expelled from nearby villages was operated in the town. The local Polish police chief, further three local policemen and a local court official were murdered by the Russians in the Katyn massacre in 1940. The German occupation ended in 1945.

== Demographics ==
Historical population

| Year | Pop. | ±% |
|---|---|---|
| 1890 | 3,882 | — |
| 1900 | 3,835 | −1.2% |
| 1910 | 3,920 | +2.2% |
| 1921 | 3,754 | −4.2% |
| 1931 | 3,761 | +0.2% |

| Year | Pop. | ±% |
|---|---|---|
| 1939 | 4,207 | +11.9% |
| 1950 | 3,716 | −11.7% |
| 1960 | 4,451 | +19.8% |
| 2010 | 5,536 | +24.4% |

== Transport ==
Śmigiel is bypassed to the east by the S5 expressway. Exits 42 and 41 of the expressway provide for quick access to Poznań and Wrocław.

== Sports ==
The local football club is Pogoń Śmigiel. It competes in the lower leagues.

== People associated with the town ==
- Wilhelm Salomon Freund (1831–1915), politician
- Eugeniusz Grys (1931–2010), world-famous Polish gynecologist, professor
- Hans Jüttner (1894–1965), SS general
- Georg John (1879–1941), actor
- Carl August Lebschée (1800–1877), artist

== Gallery ==
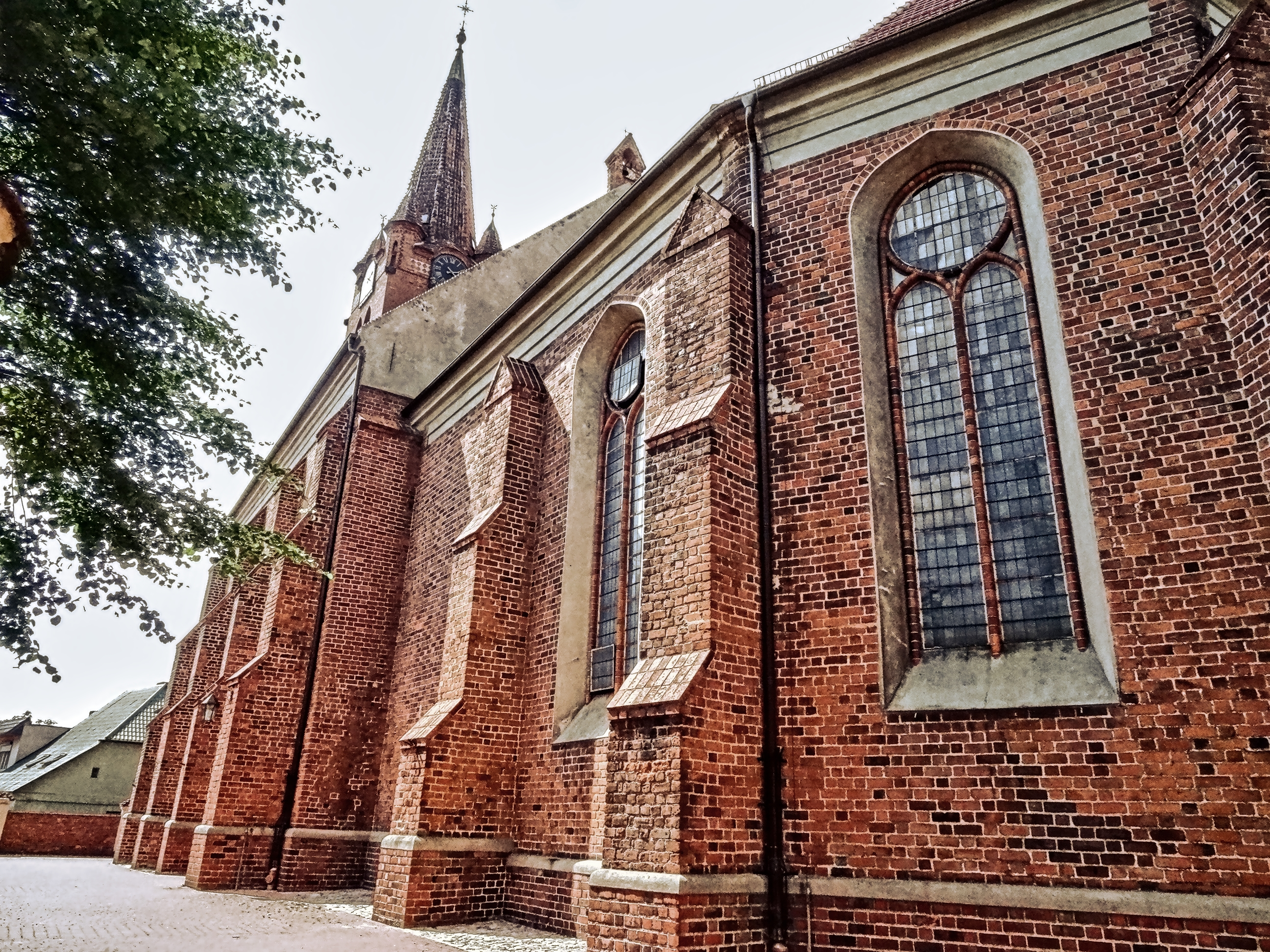
Church of the Assumption of Mary

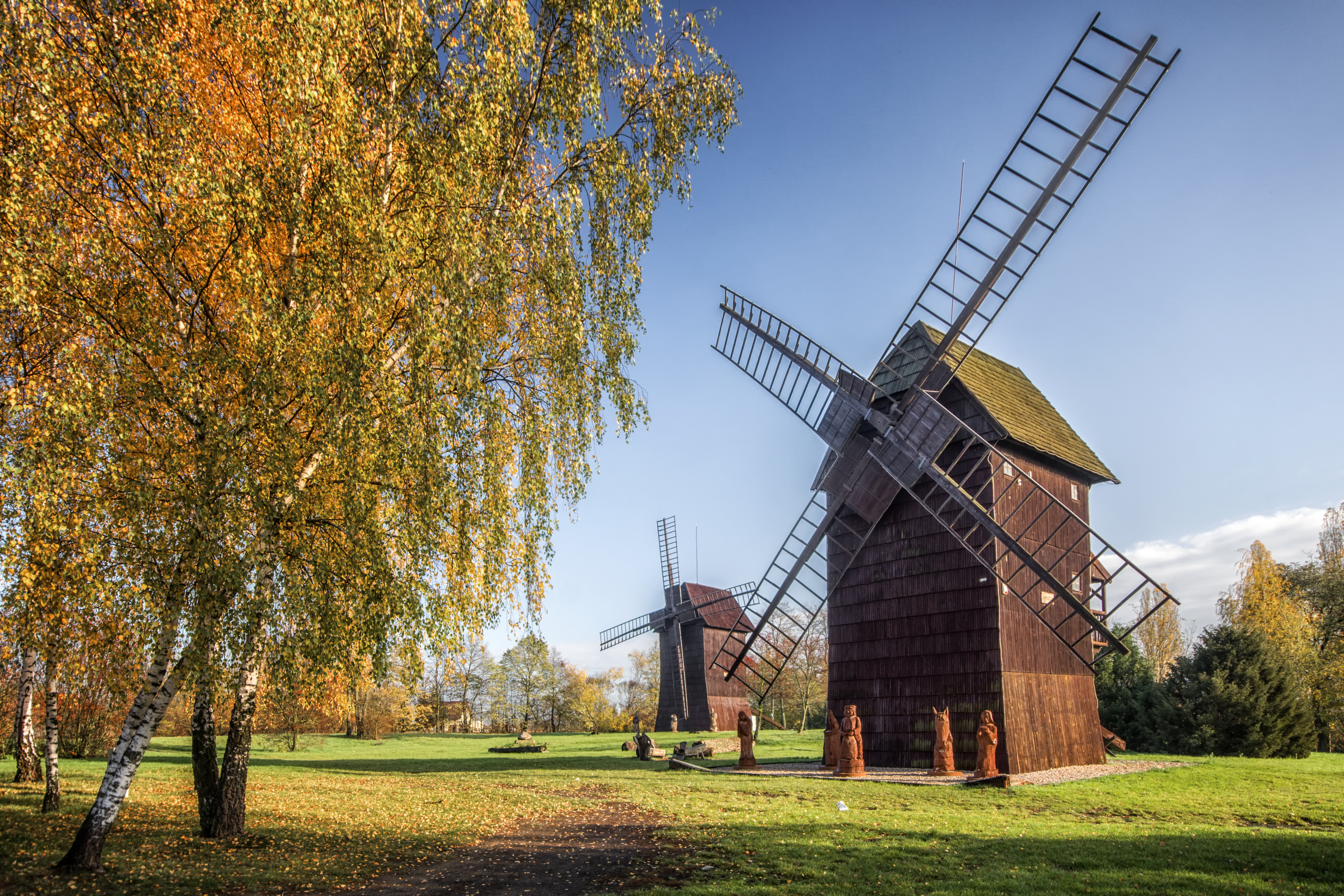
Old windmills

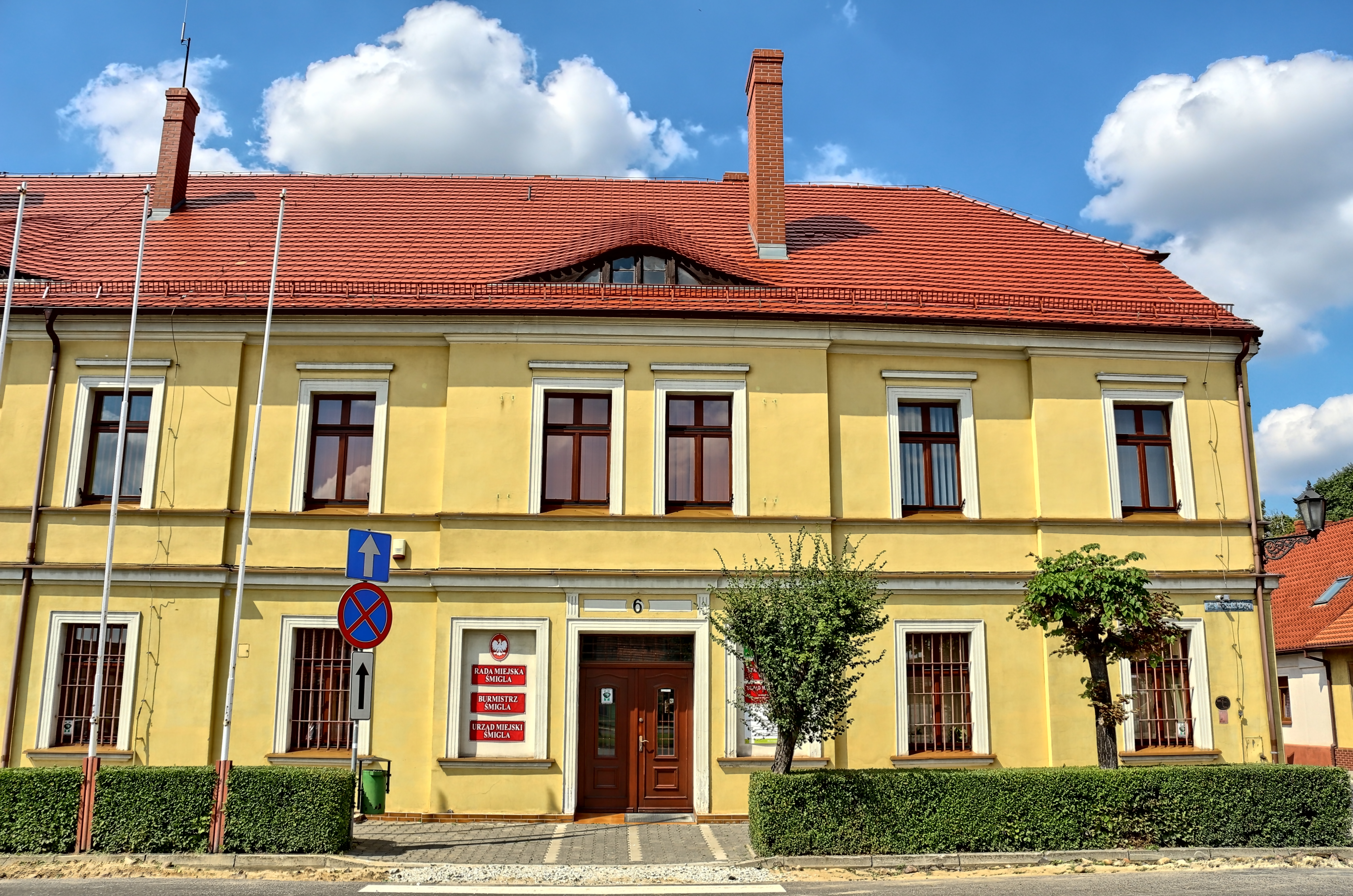
Town hall

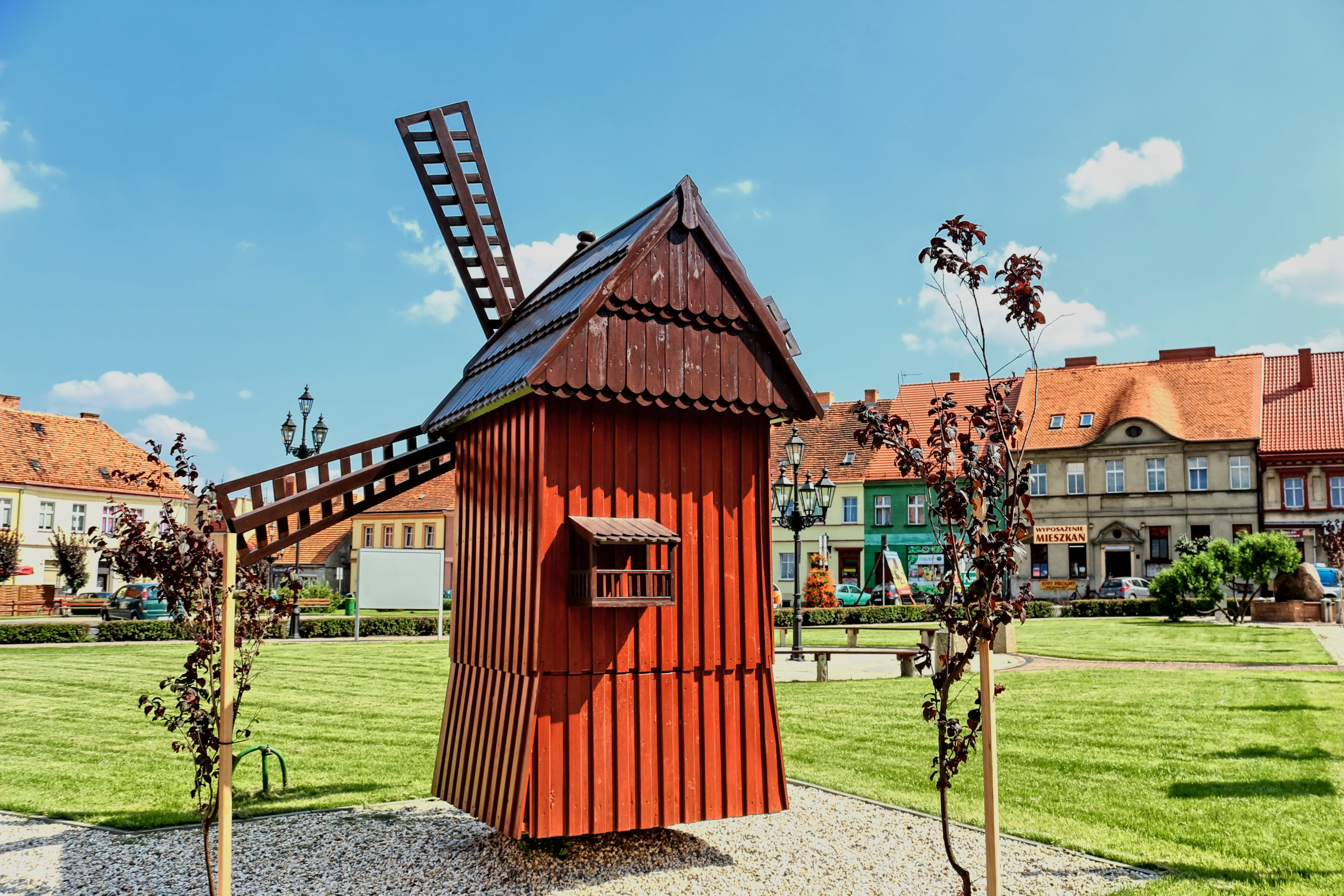
Plac Rozstrzelanych

== See also ==
- Smigel (Polish surname)
