= Robert Smigel =

American comedian, writer, and actor (born 1960)

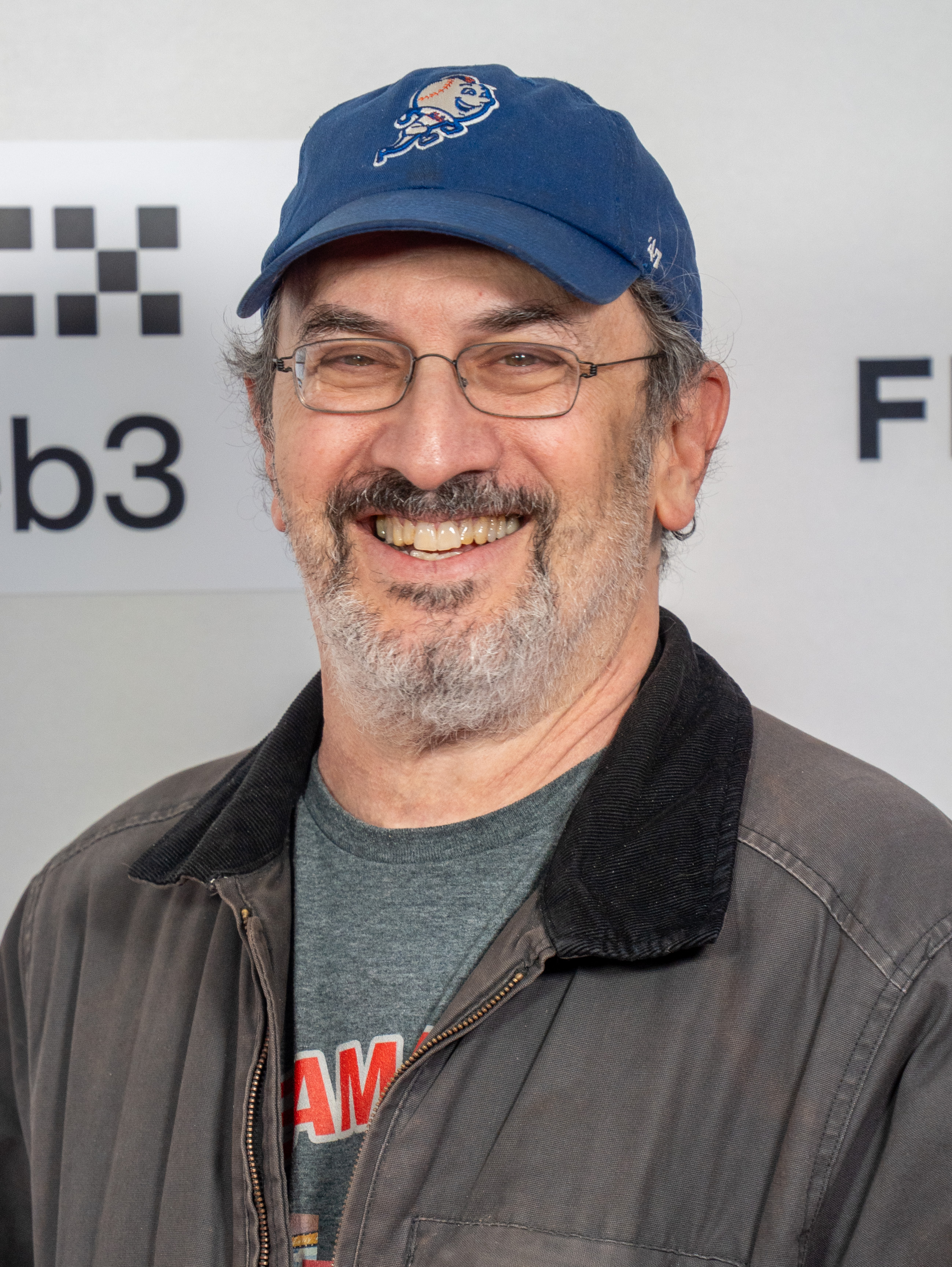
- Smigel at the 2025 Tribeca Festival
- Born: February 7, 1960 (age 66); New York City, New York, U.S.
- Education: New York University (BA)
- Occupations: Actor; comedian; writer; director; producer; puppeteer
- Years active: 1985–present
- Notable work: TV Funhouse; Triumph the Insult Comic Dog
- Spouse: Michelle Saks
- Children: 3
- Father: Irwin Smigel

Robert Smigel (born February 7, 1960) is an American actor, comedian, writer, director, producer, and puppeteer, known for his Saturday Night Live "TV Funhouse" cartoon shorts and as the puppeteer and voice behind Triumph the Insult Comic Dog. He also co-wrote the first two Hotel Transylvania films, You Don't Mess with the Zohan, and Leo, all starring Adam Sandler.

== Early life ==
Robert Smigel was born in New York City, to Lucia and Irwin Smigel, an aesthetic dentist, innovator and philanthropist. He is Jewish and frequently went to Jewish summer camp. He attended Cornell University, studying pre-dental, and graduated from New York University's College of Arts and Science in 1983 with a degree in political science.

Smigel began developing his comedic talent at The Players Workshop in Chicago, where he studied improvisation with Josephine Forsberg. Bob Odenkirk was a fellow student there. Smigel was also a member of the Chicago comedy troupe "All You Can Eat" in the early 1980s.

== Career ==
Smigel first established himself as a writer on Saturday Night Live by joining the writing staff when Lorne Michaels returned as executive producer for the 1985–1986 season. Smigel was hired after then-SNL producers Al Franken and Tom Davis saw Smigel in a Chicago sketch show. Smigel was among the few writers who survived a purge of writers and cast at the conclusion of the "disappointing" 1985–1986 season. This is when Smigel began to write more memorable sketches, including one where host William Shatner urged worshipful attendees at a Star Trek convention to "get a life." Smigel rarely appeared on screen, though he was credited as a featured player in the early 1990s and played a recurring character in the Bill Swerski's Superfans sketches.

While on a writers' strike from Saturday Night Live following the 1987–88 season, Smigel wrote for an improvisational comedy revue in Chicago with fellow SNL writers Bob Odenkirk and Conan O'Brien called Happy Happy Good Show.

Smigel co-wrote Lookwell with Conan O'Brien for NBC. The pilot never went to series, but it has become a cult hit and has screened live at "The Other Network", a festival of un-aired TV pilots produced by Un-Cabaret, featuring live and taped intros by Smigel. Smigel later became the first head writer at Late Night with Conan O'Brien, where he created numerous successful comedy bits, including one where Smigel performed only the lips of public figures which were superimposed on photos of the actual people. (This technique was pioneered on the Clutch Cargo cartoon series as a cost-saving measure, and was known as Syncro-Vox.)

In 1996, Smigel wrote and performed on the short-lived Dana Carvey Show, a primetime sketch comedy program on ABC. Despite its premature end, the show provided Smigel the opportunity to debut his first cartoon The Ambiguously Gay Duo. Upon the show's cancellation, Smigel continued developing more cartoon ideas the following summer and would begin airing them on Saturday Night Live under the TV Funhouse banner. Smigel would later claim "My whole career came out of the impulse to do cartoons on The Dana Carvey Show."

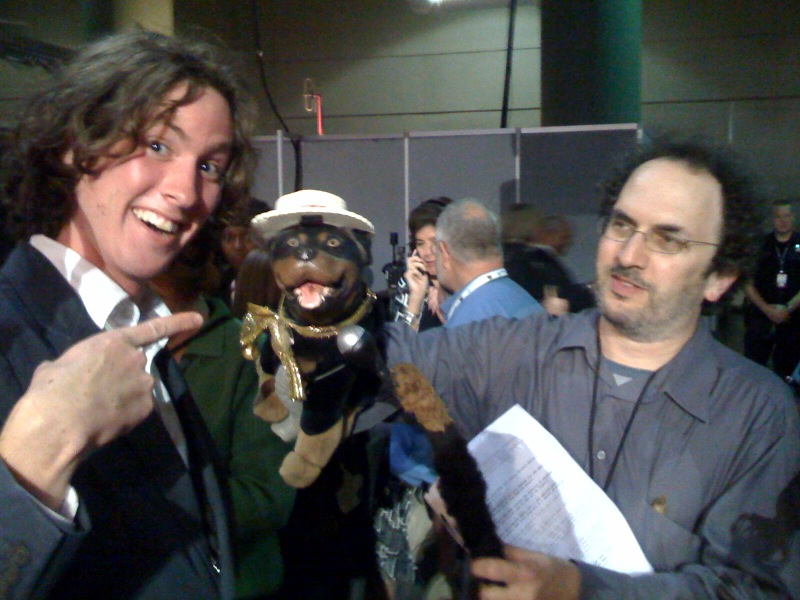
Robert Smigel (right) performing his puppet character, Triumph the Insult Comic Dog, at 2008 Republican National Convention with Associated Press production assistant (left)

Smigel's most famous creation, however, would be the foul-mouthed puppet Triumph the Insult Comic Dog, who mercilessly mocks celebrities and others in the style of a Borscht Belt comedian. This character debuted on Late Night with Conan O'Brien in February 1997 and would continue to make appearances on the show, as well as others, for many years to come.

Smigel continued to establish himself on Saturday Night Live by producing short animated segments under the title TV Funhouse, which usually satirizes public figures and popular culture. It spawned a TV show on Comedy Central featuring a mix of puppets, animation, and short sketches, although only eight episodes were aired (during the winter of 2000–2001). Smigel occasionally appears in films (usually alongside SNL veterans such as Adam Sandler). According to interviews, Smigel helped punch up the scripts for Little Nicky and The Wedding Singer. Smigel acted alongside fellow SNL writer Bob Odenkirk in Wayne's World 2 as a nerd backstage at an Aerosmith concert. His contributions were uncredited.

In 2000, he voiced a sage bulldog named Mr. Beefy in Little Nicky. Smigel, along with Adam Sandler and Judd Apatow, wrote the script for the film You Don't Mess with the Zohan in which Smigel played Yosi, an Israeli electronics salesman. Smigel is also one of the executive producers of the film, which is a first for him despite his frequent collaborations with Sandler.

It was reported in 2006 that Smigel and Adam Sandler were working on an animated sitcom for Fox called Animals. Fox has not made any official statement regarding the show. Additionally, Smigel played a gay mailman in the Adam Sandler film I Now Pronounce You Chuck and Larry and Yari the Mechanic in the "Mister Softee" episode of Curb Your Enthusiasm.

He voiced Ray and the Star Wars character, Emperor Palpatine, in the first episode of Robot Chicken: Star Wars, as well as the monster One Hundred in the episode of the same name of Aqua Teen Hunger Force.

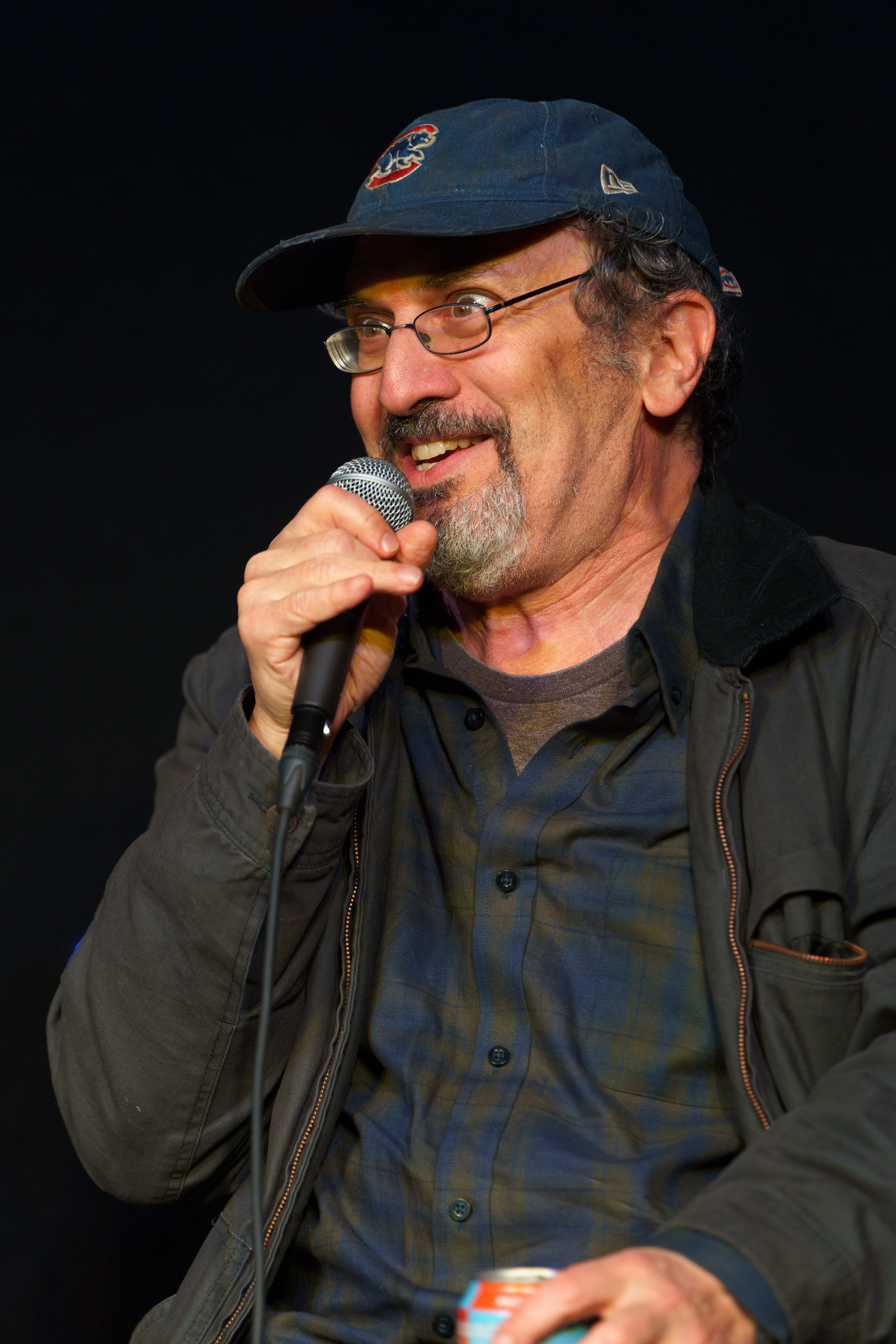
Smigel at SXSW 2024

Currently living in New York, he co-wrote and co-executive produced the films Hotel Transylvania (2012) and Hotel Transylvania 2 (2015), in which he voiced Marty, a fake version of Dracula, and Harry Three-Eye, respectively. In the fifth season of the FX show, Louie, Smigel received a story credit on the episode "Cop Story", as a similar incident as to what appears in the show actually happened to him, down to the cop crying in his apartment while Smigel went out, found the missing gun and carried it home, terrified that anyone would notice. Michael Rapaport's character Lenny wasn't based on the man Smigel knew, however, since all Smigel ever told Louis C.K. about was the gun itself.

Smigel created, wrote, executive produced, and starred as Triumph the Insult Comic Dog in The Jack and Triumph Show, alongside Jack McBrayer in 2015. It was announced in January 2016 that Smigel would be starring as Triumph in Triumph's Election Special 2016 on Hulu the following February.

In September 2020, after being brought on to develop the project in 2019, Fox announced that Smigel would executive produce Let's Be Real — a one-off adaptation of the French satirical series Les Guignols.

On June 16, 2022, Smigel was arrested for unlawful entry of the Longworth House Office Building in Washington, D.C., along with eight other individuals associated with The Late Show with Stephen Colbert. CBS released a statement saying that "Their interviews at the Capitol were authorized and pre-arranged through Congressional aides of the members interviewed", and that "After leaving the members’ offices on their last interview of the day, the production team stayed to film stand-ups and other final comedy elements in the halls when they were detained by Capitol Police." Fox News pundit Tucker Carlson accused Smigel of "insurrection" and that it was "exactly like what happened" in apparent reference to the 2021 United States Capitol attack. Stephen Colbert addressed the incident in his monologue, stating that Smigel had committed "First-Degree Puppetry" and that "Drawing any equivalence between rioters storming our Capitol to prevent the counting of electoral ballots and a cigar-chomping toy dog is a shameful and grotesque insult to the memory of everyone who died." The United States Capitol Police released a statement saying that "This is an active criminal investigation, and may result in additional criminal charges after consultation with the U.S. Attorney." On July 19, it was announced no charges would be filed.

== Personal life ==
Smigel met his wife, Michelle Saks, when she worked as a lighting technician for the theater in Chicago where he performed as part of the comedy troupe "All You Can Eat and the Temple of Dooom." They have three children together.

Smigel and Saks serve on the board of NEXT for AUTISM, formerly New York Collaborates for Autism, a non-profit organization founded in 2003 to address the needs of autistic individuals and their families, as their eldest child has autism. Smigel created the Night of Too Many Stars, a biannual celebrity fundraiser to benefit autism education. He won an Primetime Emmy Award for Outstanding Interactive Program for the 2012 broadcast of Night of Too Many Stars at the 65th Primetime Emmy Awards.

== Recurring characters on SNL ==
- Carl Wollarski, from "Bill Swerski's Superfans"
- Hank Fielding, with "The Moron's Perspective" on Weekend Update
- One of the Hub's Gyros employees (aka the "You like-ah the Juice?" guys)
- Avi, the Sabra Price is Right announcer
- Bighead, in The Ambiguously Gay Duo cartoons

== Celebrity impressions ==
- Alan Dershowitz (on SNL)
- Woody Allen (on SNL)
- Al Sharpton (on SNL TV Funhouse cartoon)
- Al Franken (on SNL TV Funhouse cartoon)
- William Ginsberg (on SNL TV Funhouse cartoon)
- Don McLean (on SNL TV Funhouse cartoon)
- Lorne Michaels (on SNL TV Funhouse cartoon)
- Pat Robertson (on SNL TV Funhouse cartoon)
- Michael Gross (on SNL TV Funhouse cartoon)
- Thomas Mesereau (on SNL TV Funhouse cartoon)
- Sinbad (on SNL TV Funhouse cartoon)
- Bob Dole (on The Dana Carvey Show)
- Gene Shalit (on The Dana Carvey Show)
- Joel Siegel (on The Dana Carvey Show)
- Bob Ross (on The Dana Carvey Show)
- Rip Torn (on The Dana Carvey Show)
- Bill Walton (on The Dana Carvey Show)
- Richard Nixon (on The Dana Carvey Show)
- Sam Donaldson (on The Dana Carvey Show)
- Hussein of Jordan (on The Dana Carvey Show)
- Quentin Tarantino (on The Dana Carvey Show)
- Ringo Starr (on The Dana Carvey Show)

== Recurring characters on Late Night with Conan O'Brien ==
- Triumph the Insult Comic Dog
- "Clutch Cargo" celebrity interviews (Bill Clinton, George W. Bush, Arnold Schwarzenegger, Don King, Bob Dole, etc.)
- One of the "Nicknames for Conan" guys (aka the "Conan the Barbarian" guys)
- One of the "Ameri-clan" guys (with Doug Dale, Louis C.K. and Dino Stamatopoulos)
- Voice of "The Late Night Emergency Guest" mannequin
- Gibberish Speaking Ronald Reagan on the Phone
- Ira, O'Brien's publicist

== Filmography ==
=== Film ===
Year	Title	Role	Notes
1993	Wayne's World 2	Concert Nerd	
1995	Billy Madison	Mr. Oblaski	
1996	Happy Gilmore	IRS Agent	
1998	Tomorrow Night	Mail Room Guy with Glasses	
1998	The Wedding Singer	Andre	
2000	Little Nicky	Mr. Beefy	Voice
2002	Punch-Drunk Love	Dr. Walter	
2007	I Now Pronounce You Chuck and Larry	Mailman	
2008	You Don't Mess with the Zohan	Yosi	Also writer and producer
2011	Jack and Jill	—N/a	Executive producer and writer of "Dunkaccino"
2012	Hotel Transylvania	Fake Dracula, Marty	Voice; also writer and executive producer
2012	This Is 40	Barry	
2015	Pixels	White House Reporter #2	
2015	Hotel Transylvania 2	Marty, Harry Three-Eye, Navigator	Voice; also writer and executive producer
2016	The Do-Over	Doctor	
2017	Too Funny to Fail	Himself	Documentary
2018	The Week Of	ER Doctor	Also writer and director
2019	Marriage Story	Mediator	
2020	The King of Staten Island	Male Pharmacy Owner	
2022	Aqua Teen Forever: Plantasm	Fraptaculan Robert	Voice
2023	Leo	Miniature Horse, Drone, Old Lizard #1, Old Lizard #3	Voice; also writer and director
2024	Between the Temples	Rabbi Bruce	
2025	Happy Gilmore 2	Lawyer	
2026	Lorne	Himself	Documentary

=== Television ===
Year	Title	Role	Notes
1985–2011	Saturday Night Live	Various	132 episodes, also writer, producer
1988	Superman 50th Anniversary Special	Brainwave	Television special
1991	Lookwell	—N/a	Television pilot; co-writer
1992	InDecision 92	Hank Fielding	Television special
1993–2009	Late Night with Conan O'Brien	Triumph the Insult Comic Dog	Voice, 79 episodes; also writer and producer
1995	Howie Mandel's Sunny Skies	Phillip	Episode: "1.10"
1996	The Dana Carvey Show	Various	8 episodes; also writer
1999	LateLine	Pearce Dummy	Episode: "Pearce on Conan"
1999	Saturday Night Live 25th Anniversary Special	Himself	Television special
2000	ShortCuts	Clive Barnes	Episode: "Food"
2000–2001	TV Funhouse	Various	Voice, 8 episodes; also creator, writer, and producer
2002	It's a Very Merry Muppet Christmas Movie	Triumph the Insult Comic Dog	Voice; television film
2003–2007	Crank Yankers	Lawyer, Samir, John Tierney	Voice, 3 episodes
2003–2017	Night of Too Many Stars	Himself / Triumph the Insult Comic Dog	Television specials; also writer and executive producer
2004	Space Ghost Coast to Coast	Triumph the Insult Comic Dog	Voice, episode: "Dreams"
2005	Arrested Development	Motherboy Member	Episode: "Motherboy XXX"
2007	Robot Chicken: Star Wars	Palpatine, Ray	Voice, television special
2008	Lewis Black's Root of All Evil	Triumph the Insult Comic Dog	Voice, episode: "NRA vs PETA"
2009–2010	The Tonight Show with Conan O'Brien	Triumph the Insult Comic Dog	Voice, 3 episodes
2009	SpongeBob SquarePants	Triumph the Insult Comic Dog	Voice, episode: "SpongeBob's Truth or Square"
2010	Aqua Teen Hunger Force	One Hundred	Voice, episode: "One Hundred"
2011	Curb Your Enthusiasm	Yari	Episode: "Mister Softee"
2011–2016	Conan	Various	11 episodes
2012–2022	Bob's Burgers	Yuli	Voice, 6 episodes
2013	The Aquabats! Super Show!	Krampus	Voice, episode: "Christmas with the Aquabats!"
2015	The Jack and Triumph Show	Triumph the Insult Comic Dog	Voice, 7 episodes; also creator, writer, and executive producer
2015	Louie	—N/a	Episode: "Cop Story"; story
2015	The Jim Gaffigan Show	Cory	Episode: "Red Velvet If You Please"
2016	Triumph's Election Special 2016	Triumph the Insult Comic Dog	Voice, television special; also writer and executive producer
2016	Portlandia	Jarvis	Episode: "Lance Is Smart"
2016	Triumph's Summer Election Special 2016	Triumph the Insult Comic Dog	Voice, television special; also writer and executive producer
2016	Triumph's Election Watch 2016	Triumph the Insult Comic Dog	Voice, miniseries; also writer and executive producer
2018	New Girl	Chaplain	Episode: "The Curse of the Pirate Bride"
2019	Svengoolie	Triumph the Insult Comic Dog	Episode: "Attack of the 50 Foot Woman"
2019	The Masked Singer	Triumph the Insult Comic Dog	Voice, episode: "Triumph Over Masks"; guest panelist
2021	Let's Be Real	Jared Kushner	Voice, 5 episodes; also writer/executive producer
2023	White House Plumbers	Friedman	Episode: "True Believers"
2023	What We Do in the Shadows	Alexander	Episode: "The Campaign"
2025	SNL50: The Homecoming Concert	Himself	Television special
2025	Saturday Night Live 50th Anniversary Special	Himself	Television special

=== Music videos ===
Year	Song title	Role	Artist
2005	"Ass Like That"	Triumph the Insult Comic Dog	Eminem
