= Too Funny to Fail =

Too Funny to Fail: The Life & Death of The Dana Carvey Show
- Directed by: Josh Greenbaum
- Written by: Josh Greenbaum
- Produced by: Josh Greenbaum; Rafael Marmor; Christopher Leggett
- Starring: Dana Carvey; Steve Carell; Stephen Colbert; Robert Smigel
- Edited by: Billy McMillin
- Music by: John Piscitello
- Production company: Delirio Films
- Distributed by: Hulu
- Release date: October 21, 2017
- Running time: 95 minutes
- Country: United States
- Language: English

Too Funny to Fail: The Life & Death of The Dana Carvey Show is an American documentary film that premiered on Hulu on October 21, 2017. Directed, written and produced by Josh Greenbaum, it explores the creation of The Dana Carvey Show, how its creative team was assembled, and how the show ultimately came to be cancelled.

== Production ==
The documentary features interviews with:

- Dana Carvey
- Steve Carell
- Stephen Colbert
- Robert Smigel
- Heather Morgan
- Bill Chott
- Bill Hader
- John Fortenberry
- Robert Carlock
- Jon Glaser
- Spike Feresten
- J. J. Sedelmaier
- Chuck Dalaklis
- Howard Rosenberg
- Ted Harbert
- John Atkinson

Cast members Louis C.K. and Charlie Kaufman only appear in archive footage.

== Reception ==
Too Funny To Fail was met with a positive response from critics upon its premiere. On the review aggregation website Rotten Tomatoes, the film holds a 100% approval rating with an average rating of 7.5 out of 10 based on 18 reviews. The website's consensus reads, "Offering a detailed and highly entertaining oral history of the failed Dana Carvey Show, Too Funny to Fail is too funny to be missed."

In a positive review, The New York Times' Margaret Lyons praised the film saying, "As sweetheart hagiographies go, the doc is joyous and funny. No one seems bitter or cynical, and the movie is less an excavation and more just a sublime collection of hilarious people speaking thoughtfully about silly clips from 20 years ago." In another favorable critique, NPR's David Bianculli commended the film saying, "Too Funny To Fail on its own terms is entertaining and enlightening from beginning to end." In a further approving analysis, The New Yorker's Ian Crouch lauded the film's tone saying, "the documentary itself is a rare thing: a movie about comedy that is, itself, actually funny." In a more mixed assessment, Uproxx's Steven Hyden criticized the structure of the film and its lack of interviews with key members of the show's crew saying, "Too Funny To Fail is a little too straightforward, dispensing the story in the conventional journalistic style of a 60 Minutes report. And the failure to land interviews with Louis C.K. and Charlie Kaufman — the former was a pivotal guiding force, the latter was a nebbish outlier on the writing staff who later applied his meta genius to meta-genius films — makes the documentary feel a little incomplete."

== See also ==
- List of original programs distributed by Hulu
