= Tomorrow Night (film) =

1998 film by Louis C.K.

- Website re-release poster
- Directed by: Louis C.K.
- Written by: Louis C.K.
- Produced by: Louis C.K. Liz Dory
- Starring: Chuck Sklar; Martha Greenhouse; J.B. Smoove; Rick Shapiro; Joseph Dolphin; Greg Hahn; Heather Morgan; Steve Carell; Wanda Sykes; Amy Poehler; Conan O'Brien; Louis C.K.
- Cinematography: Paul Koestner
- Edited by: Doug Abel
- Music by: Neal Sugarman
- Production company: Circus King Films
- Release date: January 23, 1998
- Running time: 87 minutes
- Country: United States
- Language: English
- Budget: $180,000

Tomorrow Night is a 1998 American absurdist comedy film written and directed by Louis C.K. and starring Chuck Sklar, Martha Greenhouse, J. B. Smoove, and Rick Shapiro. Many other comedians and comedy actors appear in the film, such as Steve Carell, Wanda Sykes, Amy Poehler (in her first film appearance), and Conan O'Brien.

== Plot ==
Charles is the misanthropic obsessive-compulsive owner of a photo shop. He lives alone, and at night sexually gratifies himself by sitting in a bowl of ice cream. One day, Charles notices an abundance of photos he has developed that have not been picked up. He begins to call each customer to remind them to pick up their photos. One of these customers is Florence, an elderly woman who is tormented by her gambling-addicted husband Lester. She longs for her son Willie, who joined the army two decades ago but has not returned any of her letters; although in fact, the dim-witted Willie does not realize that he is on the end of a cruel joke played by the Army mail-room workers who have not given him any of his mother's letters over the past twenty years or sent his.

Charles decides to seek companionship; he attempts to date an aggressively sexual prostitute named Lola Vagina but finds her too extroverted. When he realizes that the final two packages of photographs in his store belong to Florence and another mysterious customer who will not pick up their phone, he visits Florence himself to deliver her photographs. After meeting her, Charles is attracted to her extreme cleanliness, and visits her the next day to ask to marry her. Florence, however, explains that her husband will never allow a divorce, but Charles asks to speak with him. That night, Lester finally wins on a horse race but is attacked and killed by a pack of wild dogs while walking home with his winnings.

Charles and Florence wed. After returning from their honeymoon in Florida, Florence discovers him sitting in ice cream. She is disgusted, but allows him to continue if he agrees to adopt a son with her. They successfully adopt Clean, a teenage African-American delinquent. Shortly after, Willie returns home and joins their family as well. That night, Florence says that she is happier than she has ever been; the next morning, Charles then asks for a divorce, but finds that Florence has died. He leaves, and Willie becomes Clean's new father.

He returns to his photo shop, where he finds the last package of photos left by a customer who did not leave his name or address. Charles attempts to call him again, but finds the number is not listed. Finally, he opens the envelope, and finds a series of photographs of random places and people. He comes to a photo of himself inspecting those photos, while the next photo is of his dead body shortly after. The film closes on Charles' terrified eyes, while Lester's laughing and dog growls are heard.

== Cast ==
- Chuck Sklar as Charles
- Martha Greenhouse as Florence
- J. B. Smoove as Mel the Mailman
- Rick Shapiro as Tina
- Joseph Dolphin as Lester
- Greg Hahn as Willie
- Heather Morgan as Lola Vagina
- Steve Carell as Mail Room Guy without Glasses
- Robert Smigel as Mail Room Guy with Glasses
- Wanda Sykes as Wanda
- Bill Chott as Fop
- Nick DiPaolo as Mister Vagina
- Cary Prusa as Waiter
- Matt Besser as Man with Beard
- Amy Poehler as Woman Sprayed by Hose
- Louis C.K. as Man Washing Sidewalk
- Conan O'Brien as himself
- Todd Barry as Man trying to shelter from rain in photostop
- Bruce Brown as Clean
- Robert Trumbull as Priest
- Gary Lahti as Adoption Agent

== Production ==
Tomorrow Night began production on a budget of $20,000, financed by Louis C.K.'s earnings as a television comedy writer on HBO's The Chris Rock Show and ABC's The Dana Carvey Show. On the first day of shooting, a crew member used the wrong type of film stock in the camera, and various other problems caused the first three days' footage to be unusable.

In April 1997, C.K. found himself running out of money to complete production. On April 9, 1997, C.K. appeared on Late Night with Conan O'Brien, showed a clip of Tomorrow Night, and made a "tongue-in-cheek entreaty for funds" to finish the film. C.K.'s friends Jon Stewart, Denis Leary, Brett Butler, Spike Feresten, Chris Rock lent him money to help finish the project, which ended up costing around $180,000 in total.

Before he was finishing with the editing process, C.K. appeared on Oddville, MTV on September 2, 1997, to discuss the upcoming film.

== Release ==
Tomorrow Night premiered at the Sundance Film Festival on January 23, 1998. The film was also screened at other festivals in 1998 including South by Southwest in March, Florida Film Festival on June 17, and the Hamptons International Film Festival in October. The film was later shown at the Village Theatre in Chicago on March 5, 1999, at the Sunset 5 Theatre in West Hollywood May 27–28, 2000, and at the Monica 4-Plex in Santa Monica June 3–4, 2000.

C.K. was unable to attract any distributors to release the film in theaters, even going as far as unsuccessfully handing out tickets at Sundance. On January 29, 2014, C.K. began selling Tomorrow Night on his website as a digital download.

== Reception ==
Dennis Harvey of Variety gave the film a mixed review, writing, "It takes the viewer awhile [sic] to settle into pic's endearing, off-kilter rhythms, and some of the material here... is uninspired. But for the most part Tomorrow Night grows steadily more hilarious as absurd situations are played out in a deliberately paced deadpan." At South by Southwest, Sarah Hepola writes that the film's characters "weave a most enjoyable jaunt into an off-kilter universe, so wild and nonsensical, so bittersweet and beautiful that it might just be our own." Writing from the Hamptons International Film Festival, David Schwartz writes, "Tomorrow Night is directed with surprising elegance and understatement. Moody black-and-white cinematography and touching yet eccentric performances add up to a potential cult favorite."

Writing in 2014 after its online re-release, Neil Genzlinger of The New York Times gave the film a negative review, writing, "It's clunky and sluggish and only intermittently funny, even given that it may be deliberately aiming for those qualities. It's not smart enough to be the kind of deadpan darling that it's trying to be." The A.V. Club gave it a C+, calling the acting, "Wildly uneven, leaning toward amateurish."
