= Josh Greenbaum =

American film director (born 1979)

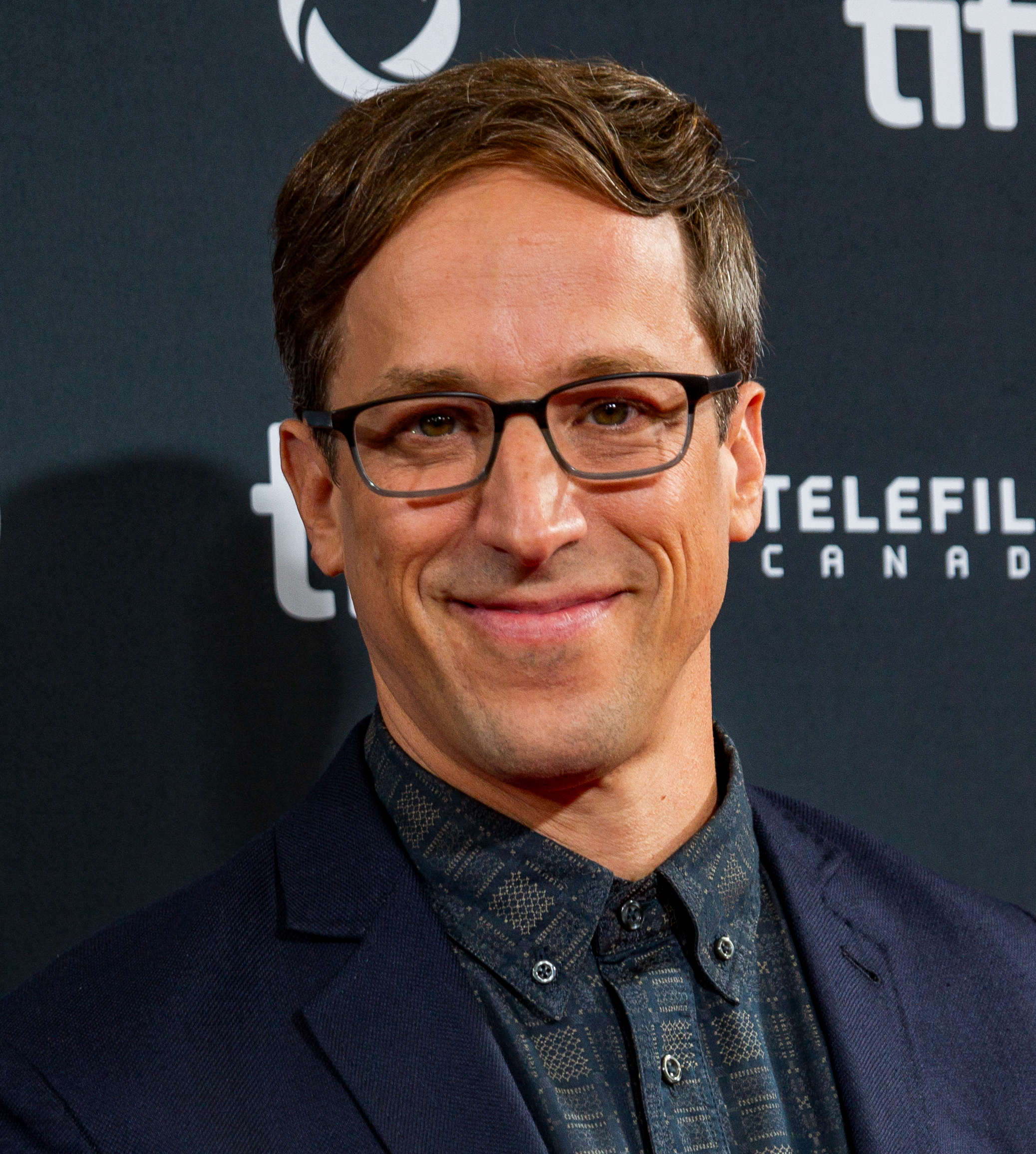
- Greenbaum in 2024
- Born: February 15, 1979 (age 47); Saratoga Springs, New York, U.S.
- Education: Cornell University, University of Oxford and University of Southern California
- Occupation: Filmmaker
- Years active: 2007–present

Joshua Greenbaum (born February 15, 1979) is an American film director, screenwriter, and producer. He has won a Peabody Award, an MTV Movie Award, CINE Golden Eagle and Emmy Award. He directed the feature documentary The Short Game, winner of the SXSW Audience Award, which was acquired by Netflix to launch their Originals film division. He also directed Becoming Bond, a documentary about George Lazenby, which won SXSW's Audience Award in the Visions category, as well as the critically acclaimed Too Funny to Fail, a documentary about The Dana Carvey Show. He is also the creator, director and executive producer of Behind the Mask, which earned Hulu its first ever Emmy nomination. He made his narrative feature debut with Barb and Star Go to Vista Del Mar. In 2024, Greenbaum directed the Peabody Award winning documentary, Will & Harper, for Netflix.

== Biography ==
Greenbaum was born on February 15, 1979 in Saratoga Springs, New York. He graduated from Cornell University and the University of Oxford. He dropped out of the MFA program at USC film school to pursue a professional career.

He won the 2007 MTV Movie Award for mtvU Best Filmmaker on Campus as well as the Coca-Cola Refreshing Filmmaker's Award while at USC.

In 2011, Greenbaum directed and co-wrote Clinton Foundation: Celebrity Division for Funny or Die, a short spoof starring Bill Clinton, Matt Damon, Kevin Spacey, Sean Penn, Ben Stiller, Jack Black, Ted Danson, Mary Steenburgen and Kristen Wiig shot for the Clinton Foundation. It premiered at Bill Clinton's "Decade of Difference" party at the Hollywood Bowl.

=== Film ===
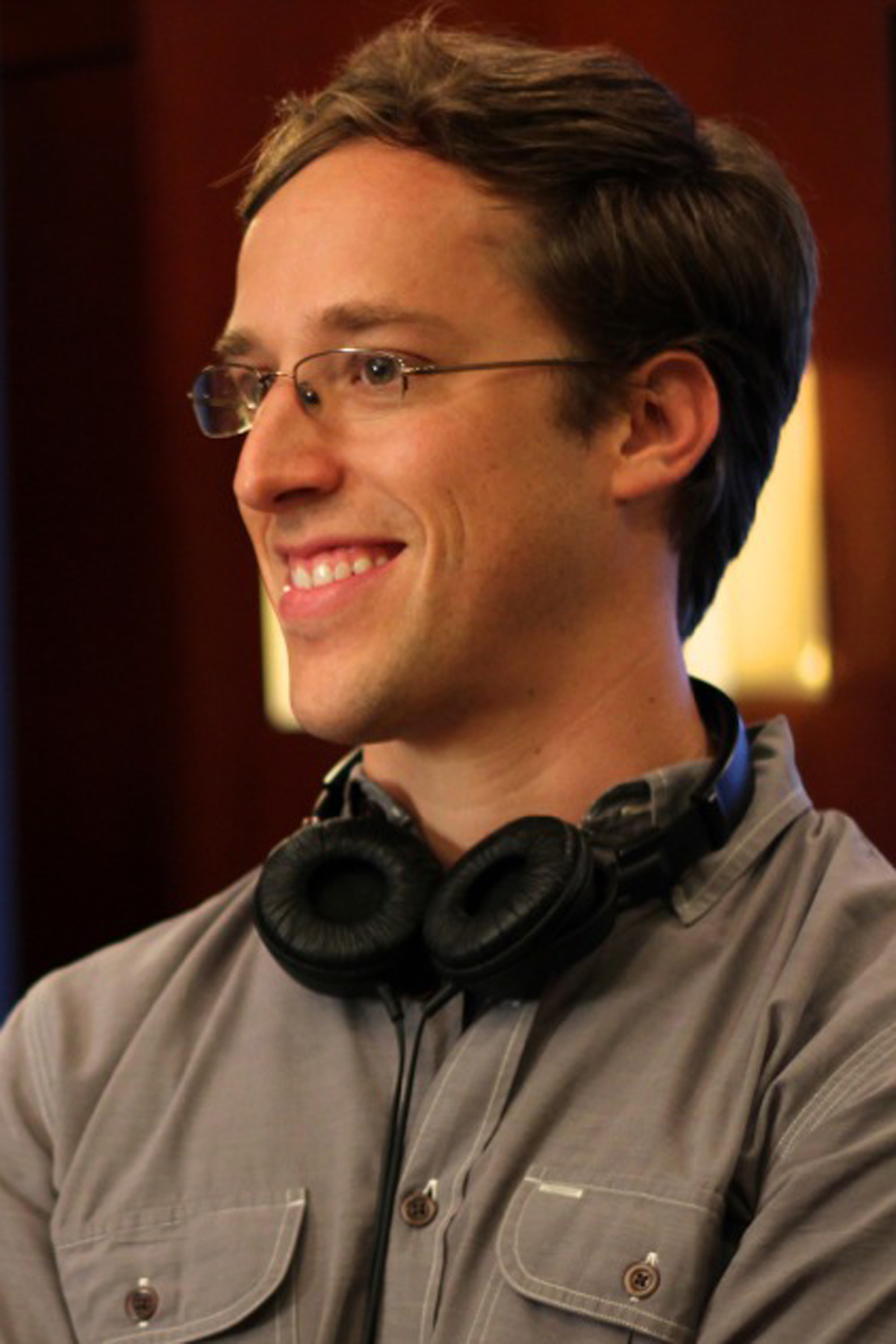
Greenbaum in 2016

Greenbaum directed the feature documentary The Short Game, which won the Audience Award at the 2013 SXSW Film Festival and was acquired by Netflix as its first exclusive documentary. The film was executive produced by Justin Timberlake and Jessica Biel.

He also directed Becoming Bond, a Hulu-distributed documentary about the Australian actor George Lazenby who portrayed James Bond in On Her Majesty's Secret Service, released in 2017. The film won SXSW's Audience Award in the Visions category and nominated for the festival's Adam Yauch Hornblower Award Nomination. It was also nominated for a Hot Docs Canadian International Documentary Festival Audience Award.

Greenbaum also directed Too Funny to Fail in 2017, a documentary about The Dana Carvey Show, also distributed by Hulu.

Greenbaum made his narrative feature debut directing Barb and Star Go to Vista Del Mar, released in 2021. The film was written by and stars Kristen Wiig and Annie Mumolo, and also features Jamie Dornan, Damon Wayans Jr., and Wendi McLendon-Covey.

In December 2021, it was announced that Greenbaum directed the comedy film Strays. In June 2025, it was announced that Greenbaum is to direct a live-action/animated film adaptation of Care Bears for Warner Bros. Pictures.

=== Television ===
Greenbaum created and directed Behind the Mask, a Hulu documentary series about sports mascots and the people in the costumes. The series earned Hulu its first Emmy nomination.

He directed episodes of New Girl for Fox, Fresh Off the Boat for ABC, Single Parents for Fox, Bless This Mess for ABC as well as two episodes of Deadbeat for Hulu and, Border Patrol featured on episodes of Comedy Central's Atom TV, created Nickelodeon's Max & Shred (nominated for the Canadian Screen Awards' Best Children's or Youth Fiction Program or Series in 2016) and directed "Good Debbie Hunting", an episode of ABC's The Neighbors. He has written and directed projects for CBS, NBC, FOX and The CW.

He also served as executive producer and director of The Playbook series for Netflix and directed the first episode, profiling NBA coach Doc Rivers.

=== Commercials ===
Greenbaum collaborated with After-School All-Stars charity, directing commercials that feature the organization's founder, Arnold Schwarzenegger. A commercial featuring Schwarzenegger on Hollywood Boulevard and at Madame Tussauds Hollywood in character as the Terminator interacting with tourists received more than 25 million views on YouTube and was awarded the YouTube Ad of the Year.

== Filmography ==
=== Film ===
Short film

Year	Title	Director	Writer	Producer	Notes
2007	The Beginning and the End	Yes	Yes	Yes	Also editor
2007	The Morning Routine	Yes	No	Yes	
2007	Sole Mates	Yes	No	Yes	
2007	Border Patrol	Yes	No	Yes	Also editor
2011	Clinton Foundation: Celebrity Division	Yes	Yes	No	
2011	Ricky and Ravi (Are in Between Jobs)	Yes	Yes	Yes	Creator
2015	Arnold Pranks Fans as the Terminator	Yes	Yes	No	

Documentary film

Year	Title	Director	Producer	Writer
2013	The Short Game	Yes	Yes	No
2017	Becoming Bond	Yes	Yes	Yes
2017	Too Funny to Fail	Yes	Yes	Yes
2024	Will & Harper	Yes	Yes	No

Feature film

Year	Title	Director	Producer
2021	Barb and Star Go to Vista Del Mar	Yes	No
2023	Strays	Yes	No
2026	The Dink	Yes	Executive
2027	Spaceballs: The New One	Yes	Yes

=== Television ===
Year	Title	Director	Executive producer	Notes
2013–2015	Behind the Mask	Yes	Yes	Also creator
2013	The Neighbors	Yes	No	Episode "Good Debbie Hunting"
2016–2018	New Girl	Yes	No	4 episodes
2017–2019	Fresh Off the Boat	Yes	No	Episodes "The Vouch", "Where Have All The Cattleman Gone?" and "Legends of the Fortieth"
2018–2019	Single Parents	Yes	No	Episodes "The Beast!", "The Shed" and "Raining Blood!"
2019	Bless This Mess	Yes	No	Episode "The Estonian Method"
2020	The Playbook	Yes	Yes	Episode "Doc Rivers"

Writer

Year	Title	Notes
(2014–2016)	Max & Shred	Also creator

== Awards and honors ==
- 2005 Emmy Awards (Rocky Mountain), Sports Program, Editing – Programs, Documentaries and Magazines (Endurance 100, Park City Television)
- 2007 Emmy Awards (Rocky Mountain), Documentary – Topical (Mwana Wako Ni Mwana Wanga - - Your Child Is My Child, Park City Television)
- 2007 Coca-Cola Refreshing Filmmaker's Award, Red Ribbon Award
- 2007 MTV Movie Awards, MTV Movie Award Best New Filmmaker (Border Patrol)
- 2012 The Webby Awards, Best Comedy Long Form or Series (The Clinton Foundation: Celebrity Division)
- 2013 Nantucket Film Festival, Best Feature, Audience Award 2nd Place (The Short Game)
- 2013 Maui Film Festival, Audience Award Feature Documentary (The Short Game)
- 2013 Hamptons International Film Festival, Audience Award Best Documentary Feature (The Short Game)
- 2013 SXSW Film Festival, Audience Award Documentary Feature (The Short Game)
- 2014 CINE Golden Eagle Film and Video Competition, Golden Eagle Televised Series (Behind the Mask)
- 2014 Sports Emmy Awards, nominated — Outstanding New Approaches Sports Programming (Behind the Mask)
- 2016 Canadian Screen Award, nominated Max and Shred best Youth Fiction Series
- 2017 Hot Docs Canadian International Documentary Festival, Top 20 Audience Favourites (Becoming Bond)
- 2017 SXSW Film Festival, VISIONS Audience Award Winner (Becoming Bond)
- 2024 Peabody Award (Will & Harper)
