= Behind the Mask (TV series) =

2010s American documentary series

- Created by: Josh Greenbaum
- Country of origin: United States
- No. of seasons: 2
- No. of episodes: 20

Original release
- Network: Hulu
- Release: October 29, 2013 – February 25, 2015

Behind the Mask is an American documentary television series that chronicles the trials and tribulations of sports mascots. The 20-episode series focuses on the unsung heroes of sports, mascots.

The series follows the lives of seven mascots at different levels, both inside and outside the suit. The series focuses on mascots at four levels: high school, college, minor leagues, and major leagues and in professional freelancing.

The first season of the series premiered on October 29, 2013, on Hulu and Hulu Plus and the season finale aired on December 17, 2013. The second season of the series premiered on February 25, 2015.

On March 26, 2014, the National Academy of Television Arts and Sciences (NATAS) has announced that the show has earned a Sports Emmy nomination for Outstanding New Approaches in Sports Programming, a first for Hulu.

== Synopsis ==
Rooty is adored by cheerleaders when he's in the outfit, but ignored by them out of it. The student behind Hey Reb is on the Bluto/Van Wilder academic track, currently in his sixth year. Tux has half the income he once had, as he pursues his dreams of working in the NHL and Bango must juggle five kids along with injuries he has sustained.

== Featured Mascots (Season 1) ==
The four mascots featured are:

Name	Mascot name	Sports program	League
Michael Hostetter	Rooty the Cedar Tree	Lebanon High School (Pennsylvania) Cedars	Pennsylvania Interscholastic Athletic Association
Chad Spencer	Tux	Wilkes-Barre/Scranton Penguins	American Hockey League
Jon "Jersey" Goldman	Hey Reb!	University of Nevada, Las Vegas (UNLV Rebels)	National Collegiate Athletic Association
Kevin Vanderkolk	Bango the Buck	Milwaukee Bucks	National Basketball Association

== Season 2 ==
Season 2 cast members were announced on November 5, 2014. The 10-episode season aired in February on Hulu. Only one of the four mascots from Season 1 returned for the second season in the series: Chad "Tux The Penguin" Spencer. Spencer was joined by Lou Seal of the San Francisco Giants, Chris Hall (a freelance mascot who has autism), and 17-year-old Gilbert Arizona High School mascot Navey "The Tiger" Baker. Season 2 premiered on February 26, 2015.

== Featured Mascots (Season 2) ==
The four mascots featured are:

Name	Mascot name	Sports program	League
Navey Baker	The Tiger	Gilbert High School (Arizona) Tigers	Arizona Interscholastic Association
Chris Hall	Multiple mascots	Freelance Mascot Cherry Hill, New Jersey	Mascot-For-Hire
Chad Spencer	Tux the Penguin	Wilkes-Barre/Scranton Penguins	American Hockey League
Joel Zimei	Lou Seal	San Francisco Giants	Major League Baseball
