= Hey Reb! =

Former mascot of the University of Nevada, Las Vegas

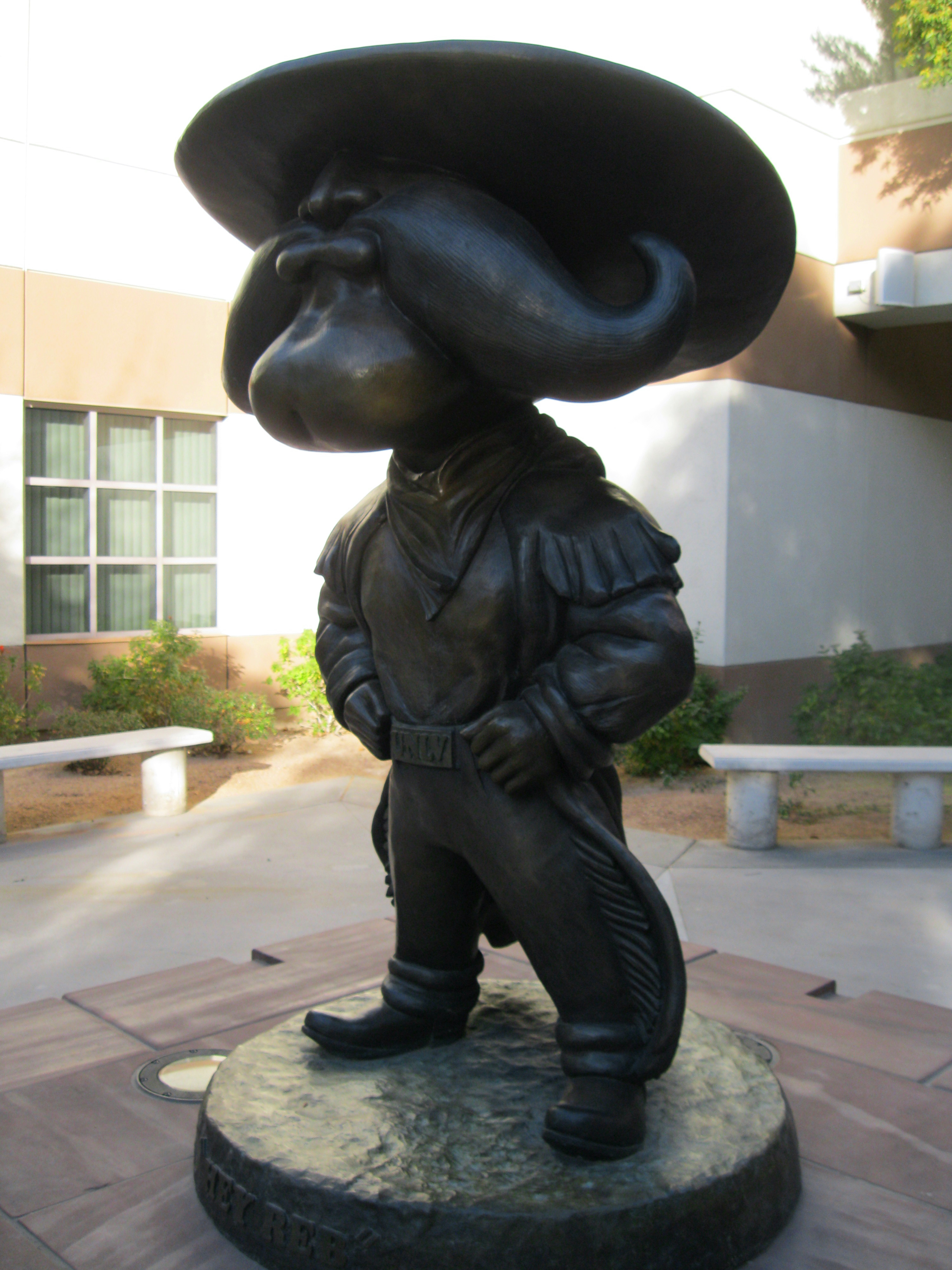
- The sculpture of Hey Reb that stood outside the Tam Alumni Center from 2007 to 2020
- University: University of Nevada, Las Vegas
- Conference: Mountain West
- Description: UNLV Rebels Mascot
- First seen: 1983; 43 years ago
- Last seen: 2020; 6 years ago

Hey Reb! was a mascot for the UNLV Rebels, the athletic teams of the University of Nevada, Las Vegas in Paradise, Nevada, USA. He performed live at all UNLV athletic events. The mascot, Hey Reb!, was first created in 1983 to depict the embodiment of an independent, rebel spirit at UNLV athletic events, intended as a tribute to western settlers.

On June 16, 2020, amid nationwide protests following the murder of George Floyd and after criticism from student groups (including the Native American Student Association), the University of Nevada, Las Vegas removed a bronze statue of Hey Reb! that had stood outside the Tam Alumni Center since 2007. The decision was made mutually with the statue’s donors, who received it back. The costumed mascot was not used in student recruitment or athletics after the statue’s removal.

On January 19, 2021, university president Keith E. Whitfield announced that Hey Reb! was permanently retired, stating there were “no plans to bring it back” and no current plans to create a replacement mascot. The Rebels nickname was retained.

In 2015, a 60 page report prepared for the university by Rainier Spencer (then Associate Vice President for Diversity Initiatives and Chief Diversity Officer) examined the history of the Rebels nickname and the Hey Reb! mascot. The report concluded that neither had a Confederate connection: the nickname predated the brief mid-1950s use of Confederate imagery (which was later dropped), and Hey Reb! was deliberately designed in 1982 as an 1800s Western pathfinder / trailblazer with Western (not Confederate or plantation) clothing and appearance. The report noted that all Confederate references at the university had been eliminated by the mid-1970s (with the exception of the student newspaper name, which later discussions sought to change).

== Previous mascots ==
UNLV's original mascot was a Confederate uniform-wearing wolf named Beauregard. Dressed in a grey uniform, Beauregard was a variation on the Confederate symbolic image of "Johnny Reb".

In the 1970s, as race discrimination issues dominated national events, community members voiced concerns that Beauregard glorified the Confederacy and had little to do with the community's history. In the early 1970s, students had voted to banish Beauregard but retained the Rebels name, rejecting alternatives such as Big Horn Rams, Nuggets, A-Bombs, and Sand Burners.

Replacing Beau was a musket-toting Minuteman, but that Revolutionary War figure failed to resonate in the West either. UNLV went without an official mascot for some time before Hey Reb was developed.

== Design ==
Hey Reb was created as a replacement for Beauregard the wolf. Mike Miller, who was a partner in a local advertising firm and headed the UNLV account, first heard of the university's search for a fitting symbol in 1982 and offered to sketch some ideas. Miller brainstormed about the kind of character that could embody the spirit of a Rebel while representing the community's history, and drew inspiration from the mountain men of the 1800s.

Hey Reb is always seen wearing a UNLV jersey with the number 57 on it, to commemorate the university's founding in the year 1957. In 2004, Hey Reb was named one of 12 All-American Mascots, and was given a chance to compete for the Capital One Bowl mascot of the year as part of the Capital One Mascot Challenge, finishing second in the online voting. Hey Reb has also been featured in two national commercials for ESPN's SportsCenter. In 2013, Hey Reb and Jon "Jersey" Goldman, the UNLV student who wears the costume to portray him, were featured in the Hulu documentary series Behind the Mask. The series followed four mascots, and the people who portrayed them, both inside and outside of the mascot costume.

== Criticism ==
The campus community was divided over the contention that the mascot still resembled a Confederate soldier and therefore appeared to be a symbol of racism. In 2015, Nevada Senator Harry Reid called for the design to be revisited again.

=== Statue removal and mascot retirement ===
On June 16, 2020, amidst protests against racial inequality following the murder of George Floyd, UNLV announced they had removed the Hey Reb! statue in front of the Tam Alumni Center, stating: "In recent conversations with the donor we mutually agreed it was best to remove the statue and return it." The university's president Marta Meana clarified the decision: "Over the past few months, I have had discussions with multiple individuals and stakeholder groups from campus and the community on how best the university can move forward given recent events throughout our nation".

The mascot itself was not used since the statue's removal and was later retired permanently on January 19, 2021, due to similar concerns as those that prompted the statue's removal. The university announced that it did not have plans to create a new mascot, and would still retain the Rebels name, comparing the mascot-less team with others such as the New York Giants.
