= Marshall's Miracle =

- Directed by: Jay Kanzler
- Written by: Jay Kanzler; Scott Zakarin
- Based on: Marshall the Miracle Dog by Cynthia Willenbrock
- Produced by: Chris Benson; Cynthia Willenbrock
- Starring: Shannon Elizabeth; Lauren Holly; Matthew Settle; Lucas McHugh Carroll; Bill Chott
- Cinematography: Chris Benson
- Production companies: Lamplight Films; Day of Fun Pictures; Zingraff Motion Pictures; Busch Productions
- Release date: August 28, 2015
- Country: United States
- Language: English

Marshall's Miracle, also known as Marshall the Miracle Dog, is a 2015 American family drama film, directed by Jay Kanzler and co-written with Scott Zakarin. The film stars Shannon Elizabeth, Lauren Holly, Matthew Settle, Bill Chott and Lucas McHugh Carroll. The film also features a cameo from the Bob & Tom Show’s Josh Arnold as well as stand up comedian Greg Warren.

The film follows Marshall, a dog who was rescued after being badly injured and abandoned, by Cyndi, who ends up adopting him a few months later.

Principal photography began on June 2, 2014, in Edwardsville, Illinois. Shooting also took place in Metro East, Troy, Il., and St. Louis, Missouri.

== Plot ==
12-year-old Finn (Lucas Carroll) endures daily torment from the bullies at his St. Louis school, but his life begins to change the day he encounters a Labrador retriever named Marshall, who he rescues from an abandoned property. When Finn first finds the dog, Marshall is being held in deplorable conditions by an animal hoarder who keeps 60 dogs penned up on her isolated ranch. The boy sees something of himself in Marshall: Both are bullied, but both are brave. By saving Marshall from the dogs that are attacking him, Finn pulls off a daring rescue—and that’s only the beginning of the story. Inspired by a true story, “Marshall the Miracle Dog” stars Shannon Elizabeth, Lauren Holly, and Matthew Settle.

== Cast ==
- Shannon Elizabeth as Cynthia Willenbrock
- Lauren Holly as Susan
- Matthew Settle as Doc Henry
- Bill Chott as Gary
- Lucas McHugh Carroll as Finn

== Production ==
In April 2014, it was announced that a film based on the book Marshall the Miracle Dog written by Cyndi Willenbrock would be made, with Jay Kanzler to direct the film.

=== Filming ===
The principal photography on the film began on June 2, 2014, in Edwardsville, Illinois. On June 12, the filming began at Tri-Township Park in Troy, which lasted for a week. Metro East was also used as one of the filming locations in Troy. Filming ended in Edwardsville on June 19, 2014, and then the production moved to St. Louis, Missouri for a couple of scenes. Filming was completed by the end of June.

=== Release ===
The film was released on August 28, 2015.
