= List of awards and nominations received by Steve Carell =

Steve Carell awards and nominations
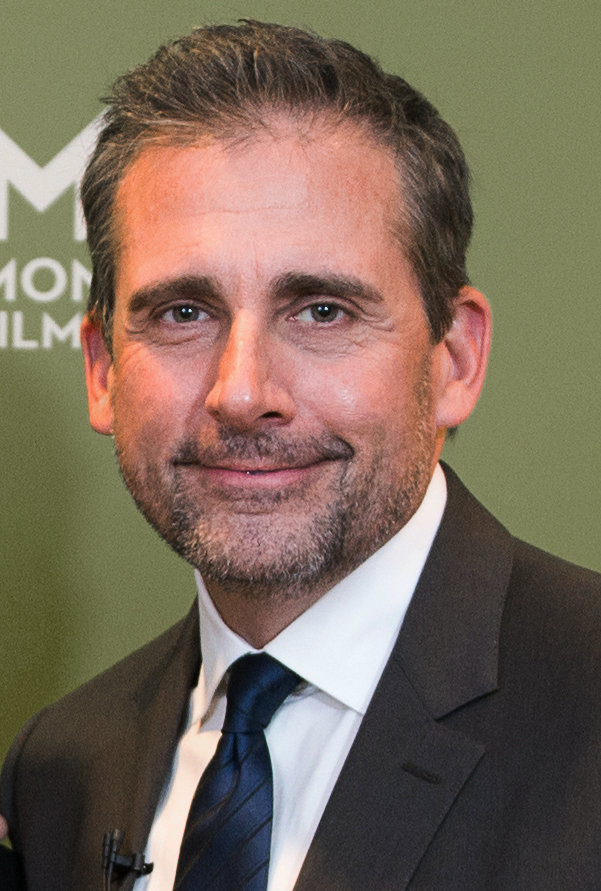
- Carell at the 2014 Montclair Film Festival
Awards and nominations
Award	Wins	Nominations
Academy Awards	0	1
Actor Awards	3	19
BAFTA Awards	0	1
Critics' Choice Awards	1	5
Emmy Awards	0	12
Golden Globe Awards	1	9
Peabody Awards	0	1

Totals (Note: Certain award groups do not simply award one winner. They acknowledge several different recipients, have runners-up, and have third place. Since this is a specific recognition and is different from losing an award, runner-up mentions are considered wins in this award tally. For simplification and to avoid errors, each award in this list has been presumed to have had a prior nomination.)
- Wins: 27
- Nominations: 130

Steve Carell is an American actor, comedian, writer, producer, and director. He has received a Golden Globe Award, three Screen Actors Guild Awards and two Writers Guild of America Awards as well as nominations for an Academy Award, 12 Primetime Emmy Awards, and a BAFTA Award. In 2016, Carell received a star on the Hollywood Walk of Fame for his contributions to motion pictures.

Carell gained stardom for his portrayal of Michael Scott in the NBC sitcom The Office (2005–2011). He received numerous accolades including the Golden Globe Award for Best Actor – Television Series Musical or Comedy in 2006 as well as nominations for five Primetime Emmy Awards for Outstanding Lead Actor in a Comedy Series and six Screen Actors Guild Awards for Outstanding Actor in a Comedy Series. For his role as a television anchor accused of sexual misconduct in the Apple TV+ drama series The Morning Show (2020) he was nominated for the Primetime Emmy Award for Outstanding Lead Actor in a Drama Series. He played a mourning therapist in the FX on Hulu series The Patient (2022) for which he was nominated for the Screen Actors Guild Award for Outstanding Performance by a Male Actor in a Miniseries or Television Movie.

On film, he played John du Pont in the Bennett Miller directed sports drama Foxcatcher (2014) for which he earned nominations for the Academy Award for Best Actor, the BAFTA Award for Best Actor in a Supporting Role, the Golden Globe Award for Best Actor in a Motion Picture – Drama, and the Screen Actors Guild Award for Outstanding Performance by a Male Actor in a Leading Role. He is also known for his roles as a man looking for love in the romantic comedy The 40-Year-Old Virgin (2005), a troubled scholar in the tragicomedy Little Miss Sunshine (2006), a businessman and investor in the biographical dramedy The Big Short (2015), and Bobby Riggs in the sports comedy Battle of the Sexes (2017).

On stage, Carell made his Broadway debut playing the title character in Lincoln Center Theater revival of the Anton Chekov play Uncle Vanya (2024) for which he was nominated for the Drama League Award for Distinguished Performance.

== Major associations ==
=== Academy Awards ===
Year	Category	Nominated work	Result	Ref.
2015	Best Actor	Foxcatcher	Nominated	

=== Actor Awards ===
Year	Category	Nominated work	Result	Ref.
2007	Outstanding Cast in a Motion Picture (Note: Shared with the cast)	Little Miss Sunshine	Won	
2007	Outstanding Ensemble in a Comedy Series	The Office (season 2)	Won	
2007	Outstanding Male Actor in a Comedy Series	The Office (season 2)	Nominated	
2008	Outstanding Ensemble in a Comedy Series	The Office (season 3)	Won	
2008	Outstanding Male Actor in a Comedy Series	The Office (season 3)	Nominated	
2009	Outstanding Ensemble in a Comedy Series	The Office (season 4)	Nominated	
2009	Outstanding Male Actor in a Comedy Series	The Office (season 4)	Nominated	
2010	Outstanding Ensemble in a Comedy Series	The Office (season 5)	Nominated	
2010	Outstanding Male Actor in a Comedy Series	The Office (season 5)	Nominated	
2011	Outstanding Ensemble in a Comedy Series	The Office (season 6)	Nominated	
2011	Outstanding Male Actor in a Comedy Series	The Office (season 6)	Nominated	
2012	Outstanding Ensemble in a Comedy Series	The Office (season 7)	Nominated	
2012	Outstanding Male Actor in a Comedy Series	The Office (season 7)	Nominated	
2015	Outstanding Male Actor in a Leading Role	Foxcatcher	Nominated	
2016	Outstanding Cast in a Motion Picture	The Big Short	Nominated	
2018	Outstanding Male Actor in a Supporting Role	Battle of the Sexes	Nominated	
2020	Outstanding Male Actor in a Drama Series	The Morning Show (season 1)	Nominated	
2022	Outstanding Ensemble in a Drama Series	The Morning Show (season 2)	Nominated	
2023	Outstanding Male Actor in a Miniseries or TV Movie	The Patient	Nominated	

=== BAFTA Awards ===
Year	Category	Nominated work	Result	Ref.
British Academy Film Awards
2015	Best Actor in a Supporting Role	Foxcatcher	Nominated	

=== Critics' Choice Awards ===
Year	Category	Nominated work	Result	Ref.
Critics' Choice Movie Awards
2007	Best Acting Ensemble	Little Miss Sunshine	Won	
2016	Best Acting Ensemble	The Big Short	Nominated	
2016	Best Actor in a Comedy	The Big Short	Nominated	
2018	Best Actor in a Comedy	Battle of the Sexes	Nominated	
Critics' Choice Television Awards
2011	Best Actor in a Comedy Series	The Office	Nominated	

=== Emmy Awards ===
Year	Category	Nominated work	Result	Ref.
Primetime Emmy Awards
2006	Outstanding Lead Actor in a Comedy Series	The Office (episode: "The Injury")	Nominated	
2007	Outstanding Lead Actor in a Comedy Series	The Office (episode: "Business School")	Nominated	
2008	Outstanding Lead Actor in a Comedy Series	The Office (episode: "Goodbye, Toby")	Nominated	
2008	Outstanding Comedy Series	The Office (season 4)	Nominated	
2009	Outstanding Comedy Series	The Office (season 5)	Nominated	
2009	Outstanding Lead Actor in a Comedy Series	The Office (episode: "Broke")	Nominated	
2010	Outstanding Lead Actor in a Comedy Series	The Office (episode: "The Cover-Up")	Nominated	
2010	Outstanding Comedy Series	The Office (season 6)	Nominated	
2011	Outstanding Comedy Series	The Office (season 7)	Nominated	
2011	Outstanding Lead Actor in a Comedy Series	The Office (episode: "Goodbye, Michael)	Nominated	
2020	Outstanding Lead Actor in a Drama Series	The Morning Show (episode: "Lonely at the Top")	Nominated	
2026	Outstanding Lead Actor in a Comedy Series	Rooster	Nominated	

=== Golden Globe Awards ===
Year	Category	Nominated work	Result	Ref.
2006	Best Actor in a Television Series – Musical or Comedy	The Office (season 2)	Won	
2007	Best Actor in a Television Series – Musical or Comedy	The Office (season 3)	Nominated	
2008	Best Actor in a Television Series – Musical or Comedy	The Office (season 4)	Nominated	
2009	Best Actor in a Television Series – Musical or Comedy	The Office (season 5)	Nominated	
2010	Best Actor in a Television Series – Musical or Comedy	The Office (season 6)	Nominated	
2011	Best Actor in a Television Series – Musical or Comedy	The Office (season 7)	Nominated	
2015	Best Actor in a Motion Picture – Drama	Foxcatcher	Nominated	
2016	Best Actor in a Motion Picture – Musical or Comedy	The Big Short	Nominated	
2018	Best Actor in a Motion Picture – Musical or Comedy	Battle of the Sexes	Nominated	

=== Peabody Awards ===
Year	Category	Nominated work	Result	Ref.
2022	Entertainment	The Patient	Nominated	

== Miscellaneous awards ==
Award	Year	Category	Nominated work	Result	Ref.
AACTA Awards	2014	Best Actor	Foxcatcher	Nominated	
AACTA Awards	2015	Best Actor	The Big Short	Nominated	
AARP Movies for Grownups Awards	2013	Best Supporting Actor	The Way, Way Back	Nominated	
AARP Movies for Grownups Awards	2014	Best Actor	Foxcatcher	Won	
AARP Movies for Grownups Awards	2017	Best Actor	Battle of the Sexes	Nominated	
American Comedy Awards	2013	Comedy Supporting Actor — Film	Anchorman 2: The Legend Continues	Nominated	
Annie Awards	2010	Voice Acting in a Feature Production	Despicable Me	Nominated	
Annie Awards	2013	Voice Acting in a Feature Production	Despicable Me 2	Nominated	
Drama League Award	2024	Distinguished Performance	Uncle Vanya	Nominated	
Dorian Awards	2014	Film Performance of the Year – Actor	Foxcatcher	Nominated	
Film Independent Spirit Awards	2014	Special Distinction Award	Foxcatcher	Won	
Gotham Awards	2006	Best Ensemble Cast	Little Miss Sunshine	Nominated	
Gotham Awards	2014	Special Jury Award – Ensemble Performance	Foxcatcher	Won	
Hollywood Film Awards	2014	Ensemble Award	Foxcatcher	Won	
Irish Film & Television Academy Awards	2014	Best International Actor	Foxcatcher	Nominated	
Kids' Choice Awards	2011	Favorite Buttkicker	Despicable Me	Nominated	
Kids' Choice Awards	2014	Favorite Voice from an Animated Movie	Despicable Me 2	Nominated	
Kids' Choice Awards	2015	Favorite Movie Actor	Alexander and the Terrible, Horrible, No Good, Very Bad Day	Nominated	
Kids' Choice Awards	2023	Favorite Voice from an Animated Movie (Male)	Minions: The Rise of Gru	Nominated	
Kids' Choice Awards	2025	Favorite Male Voice from an Animated Movie	Despicable Me 4	Nominated	
MTV Movie Awards	2005	Best On-Screen Team	Anchorman: The Legend of Ron Burgundy	Nominated (Note: Shared with Will Ferrell, David Koechner and Paul Rudd)	
MTV Movie Awards	2005	Best Musical Performance (Note: Shared with Will Ferrell, David Koechner, Paul Rudd and Fred Armisen)	Anchorman: The Legend of Ron Burgundy	Nominated	
MTV Movie Awards	2006	Best Comedic Performance	The 40-Year-Old Virgin	Won	
MTV Movie Awards	2006	Best Performance	The 40-Year-Old Virgin	Nominated	
MTV Movie Awards	2006	Best On-Screen Team	The 40-Year-Old Virgin	Nominated (Note: Shared with Romany Malco, Seth Rogen and Paul Rudd)	
MTV Movie Awards	2009	Best Comedic Performance	Get Smart	Nominated	
MTV Movie Awards	2014	Best Fight	Anchorman 2: The Legend Continues	Nominated (Note: Shared with Will Ferrell, Paul Rudd, David Koechner, James Marsden, Sacha Baron Cohen, Kanye West, Tina Fey, Amy Poehler, Jim Carrey, Marion Cotillard, Will Smith, Liam Neeson, John C. Reilly and Greg Kinnear)	
MTV Movie Awards	2014	Best WTF Moment	Anchorman 2: The Legend Continues	Nominated (Note: Shared with Will Ferrell, David Koechner and Paul Rudd)	
MTV Movie Awards	2015	Best On-Screen Transformation	Foxcatcher	Nominated	
People's Choice Awards	2009	Favorite Funny Male Star	—N/a	Nominated	
People's Choice Awards	2010	Favorite TV Comedy Actor	—N/a	Won	
People's Choice Awards	2011	Favorite Comedic Star	—N/a	Nominated	
People's Choice Awards	2011	Favorite On-Screen Team	Date Night	Nominated (Note: Shared with Tina Fey)	
People's Choice Awards	2011	Favorite TV Comedy Actor	—N/a	Nominated	
People's Choice Awards	2012	Favorite Comedic Movie Actor	—N/a	Nominated	
People's Choice Awards	2020	Male TV Star	Space Force	Nominated	
Satellite Awards	2006	Best Actor – Television Series Musical or Comedy	The Office	Nominated	
Satellite Awards	2007	Best Actor – Television Series Musical or Comedy	The Office	Nominated	
Satellite Awards	2010	Best Actor – Television Series Musical or Comedy	The Office	Nominated	
Satellite Awards	2010	Best Actor in a Motion Picture – Musical or Comedy	Dinner for Schmucks	Nominated	
Satellite Awards	2014	Best Actor – Motion Picture	Foxcatcher	Nominated	
Teen Choice Awards	2006	Choice TV Actor – Comedy	The Office	Nominated	
Teen Choice Awards	2007	Choice Movie Actor – Comedy	Evan Almighty	Nominated	
Teen Choice Awards	2007	Choice Hissy Fit	Evan Almighty	Nominated	
Teen Choice Awards	2007	Choice Scream	Evan Almighty	Won	
Teen Choice Awards	2007	Choice TV Actor – Comedy	The Office	Won	
Teen Choice Awards	2008	Choice TV Actor – Comedy	The Office	Won	
Teen Choice Awards	2009	Choice TV Actor – Comedy	The Office	Nominated	
Teen Choice Awards	2010	Choice Movie Actor – Comedy	Date Night	Nominated	
Teen Choice Awards	2010	Choice Dance	Date Night	Nominated	
Teen Choice Awards	2010	Choice TV Actor – Comedy	The Office	Nominated	
Teen Choice Awards	2011	Choice TV Actor – Comedy	The Office	Nominated	
Teen Choice Awards	2012	Choice Chemistry	Crazy, Stupid, Love	Nominated (Note: Shared with Ryan Gosling)	
Teen Choice Awards	2012	Choice Hissy Fit	Crazy, Stupid, Love	Nominated	
Teen Choice Awards	2013	Choice Movie Actor – Comedy	The Incredible Burt Wonderstone	Nominated	
Teen Choice Awards	2013	Choice Hissy Fit	Despicable Me 2	Nominated	
Writers Guild of America Awards	2005	Best Original Screenplay	The 40-Year-Old Virgin	Nominated (Note: Shared with Judd Apatow)	
Writers Guild of America Awards	2006	Comedy Series	The Office	Won	
Writers Guild of America Awards	2006	Episodic Comedy (Episode: "Casino Night")	The Office	Won	
Writers Guild of America Awards	2007	Comedy Series	The Office	Nominated	
Writers Guild of America Awards	2008	Comedy Series	The Office	Nominated	

== Festivals ==
Award	Year	Category	Nominated work	Result	Ref.
Monte-Carlo Television Festival	2008	Outstanding Actor – Comedy Series	The Office	Nominated	
Monte-Carlo Television Festival	2010	Outstanding Actor – Comedy Series	The Office	Won	
Palm Springs International Film Festival	2014	Creative Impact in Acting Award	Foxcatcher	Won	
Palm Springs International Film Festival	2015	Ensemble Performance Award	The Big Short	Won	
Santa Barbara International Film Festival	2014	Outstanding Performer of the Year	Foxcatcher	Won	

== Critics groups ==
Award	Year	Category	Nominated work	Result	Ref.
Alliance of Women Film Journalists	2013	Most Egregious Age Difference Between; The Leading Man and The Love Interest Award	Seeking a Friend for the End of the World	Nominated	
Alliance of Women Film Journalists	2019	Best Actor in a Supporting Role	Vice	Nominated	
Dublin Film Critics' Circle	2015	Best Actor	Foxcatcher	3rd Place	
National Board of Review	2015	Best Cast	The Big Short	Won	
New York Film Critics Circle	2006	Best Supporting Actor	Little Miss Sunshine	3rd Place	
St. Louis Film Critics Association	2006	Best Supporting Actor	Little Miss Sunshine	Nominated	
St. Louis Film Critics Association	2018	Best Supporting Actor	Vice	Nominated	
Television Critics Association	2006	Individual Achievement in Comedy	The Office	Won	
Television Critics Association	2009	Individual Achievement in Comedy	The Office	Nominated	
Vancouver Film Critics Circle	2006	Best Supporting Actor	Little Miss Sunshine	Nominated	
Washington D.C. Area Film Critics Association	2006	Best Ensemble	Little Miss Sunshine	Won	
Washington D.C. Area Film Critics Association	2013	Best Ensemble	The Way, Way Back	Nominated	
Washington D.C. Area Film Critics Association	2015	Best Ensemble	The Big Short	Nominated	
