= Bill Chott =

American actor and comedian

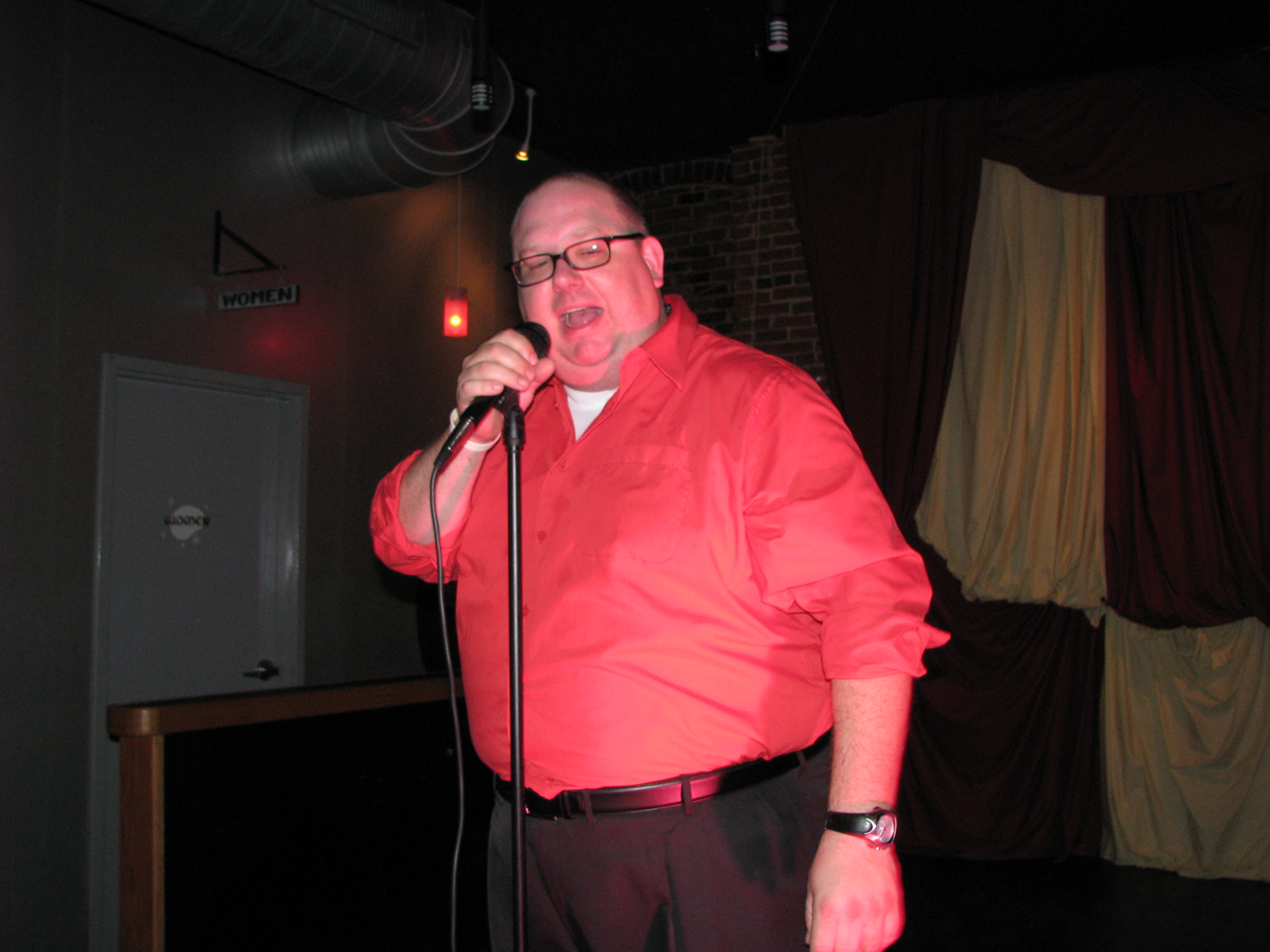
- Chott in 2008
- Born: July 23, 1969 (age 57); St. Louis, Missouri, U.S.
- Education: Ritenour High School; Central Methodist University (BA)
- Occupations: Actor, comedian
- Years active: 1998–present

Bill Chott (born July 23, 1969) is an American actor and comedian. He is best known for his role as Mr. Laritate on the Disney Channel series Wizards of Waverly Place.

== Early life ==
During his school years, Chott appeared in numerous plays and musicals. He graduated from Ritenour High School, and in 2010 was inducted into their Alumni Hall of Fame. He continued pursuing theater in college at Central Methodist University in Fayette, Missouri, acting in a wide variety of plays. He was also in Chi Delta fraternity while at Central Methodist as well as Phi Mu Alpha Sinfonia's Beta Mu chapter. He left Missouri in 1992, and headed to Chicago, IL where he quickly became involved with improvisational theater at ComedySportz, IO Theater, and the Second City comedy troupe. His contemporaries in the Chicago improv scene included Steve Carell, Stephen Colbert, Tina Fey and Amy Poehler.

== Career ==
=== Writing ===
Chott toured the country and in 1995 he made his television debut on The Dana Carvey Show, among a repertory cast that included Stephen Colbert, Steve Carell, and Robert Smigel. His most lasting contribution to the program was as the announcer for The Ambiguously Gay Duo, a series of animated shorts created by Smigel and J.J. Sedelmaier, which continued to be produced by J.J. Sedelmaier Productions for Saturday Night Live after the quick cancellation of The Dana Carvey Show.

=== Film ===
His film roles include performances in Galaxy Quest, Dude, Where's My Car?, Brainwarp, Dante's Inferno, Wild Girls Gone, Dancing at the Blue Iguana and The Ringer.

=== Television ===
His television appearances include 3rd Rock from the Sun, Freaks and Geeks, Popular, ER, Crossballs, Weekends at the DL, CSI, Wizards of Waverly Place, It's Always Sunny in Philadelphia, She Spies, Young Sheldon, This Is Us, and Monk.

=== Theater ===
Lucille Ball fans will recognize him for his award-winning portrayal of Fred Mertz in I Love Lucy: Live on Stage.

Chott continues to teach and coach improvisational comedy in both Los Angeles and St. Louis, through his school The Improv Trick.

== Filmography ==
Year	Title	Role	Notes
1998	Tomorrow Night	English Dandy	
1998	Crossfire	Security Guard	
1999	Children of the Struggle	Cafe Manager	
1999	Galaxy Quest	Fan #1	
2000	Dancing at the Blue Iguana	Angel's Regular	
2000	Dude, Where's My Car?	Big Cult Guard #1	
2004	Outpost	Larry	Video short
2004	Nerd Hunter 3004	Fantasy Nerd	Short
2005	The Ringer	Thomas	
2006–2007	Curious George	Hundley / The Doorman	Voice, 18 episodes
2007	Dante's Inferno	Ciaccio 'El Gordo' / Calvacanti / Stalin / Ulysses' Crew	
2007	It's Always Sunny in Philadelphia	Gary	Episode: Mac is a Serial Killer
2007	Wild Girls Gone	Ice Cream Manager	
2007	The Red Sandwich Christmas Hour		
2008–2011	Wizards of Waverly Place	Mr. Laritate	23 episodes
2010	Night Terrors	Troy Cody	(segment "Christmas Stalking")
2011	Four Weddings and a Shaadi		
2011	The Rum Diary	Bowling Champ	
2012	Santa Paws 2: The Santa Pups	Mr. Holman	
2013	The Middle	Wendell	
2013	Paranormal Roommates	Nessie (voice)	Pilot
2014	The Snow Queen 2	Lukum	English version, Voice
2015	Marshall the Miracle Dog	Gary Weaver	
2017	This Is Us	Mailman	Episode: What Now?
2018–2021	Young Sheldon	Dean/Franklin	2 episodes
2019	Legion	Teacher	Episode: Chapter 20
2019	Klaus		Voice
2019	Snowfall	Union Rep Steve	Episode: The Bottoms
2020	The Seniors Improv Comedy	Guest Improviser	
2020	WizWorld LIVE	Fart Mage	
2022	Mid-Century	Dr. Volker	
2022	Monster: The Jeffrey Dahmer Story	MPA President	Episode: The Bogeyman
2025	Wizards Beyond Waverly Place	Mr. Laritate	1 episode
