= Bark! =

- Directed by: Katarzyna Adamik
- Written by: Heather Morgan
- Starring: Lee Tergesen; Heather Morgan; Lisa Kudrow; Vincent D'Onofrio; Hank Azaria
- Distributed by: TVA International
- Release date: January 11, 2002 (Sundance)
- Running time: 100 minutes
- Language: English

Bark! is a 2002 film written by Heather Morgan, directed by Katarzyna Adamik (the daughter of director Agnieszka Holland) and starring Morgan, Lee Tergesen, and Lisa Kudrow. The film debuted at the 2002 Sundance Film Festival, where it was nominated for a Grand Jury Prize.

The "extremely low-budget" film, had its origins in a 90-second comedy sketch.

== Plot ==
The film depicts Lucy, a professional dogwalker (played by Morgan), who gradually assumes the identity of a dog. Tergesen plays Peter, her embarrassed husband, and Kudrow plays their veterinarian.

== Cast ==
- Lee Tergesen as Peter
- Heather Morgan as Lucy
- Lisa Kudrow as Darla
- Vincent D'Onofrio as Malcolm
- Hank Azaria as Sam
- Mary Jo Deschanel as Betty
- Scott Wilson as Harold
- Aimee Graham as Rebecca
- Wade Andrew Williams as Tom

== Release ==
The film was screened at several film festivals, including the Moscow International Film Festival, the Munich Film Festival, the Warsaw International Film Festival, and the Cleveland International Film Festival, but never received a theatrical release.

The film was eventually released on DVD in 2003 by TVA International.

== Reception ==
Variety, reviewing the film after its Sundance screening, said it "seems to be a throwback to the craziness-as-higher-expression-of-individuality school that was in vogue between The King of Hearts and Harold and Maude, noting "Lucy's withdrawal doesn't seem to spring from anything — unless urban life's everyday rudeness and an overbearingly suburban-banal family background count — and scene by scene, Bark! builds no discernible rhythm, viewpoint or mood apart from a faint, rudderless, shaggy-joke tenor.
