= Martha Greenhouse =

American actress

- Martha Greenhouse in Theatre World 1960
- Born: Martha Miriam Greenhouse; June 14, 1921; Omaha, Nebraska, U.S.
- Died: January 5, 2013 (aged 91)
- Occupation: Actress
- Years active: 1956–1999

Martha Miriam Greenhouse (June 14, 1921 – January 5, 2013) was an American stage, film, and television actress, who also served as an actors' union leader.

The Omaha, Nebraska-born actress spent her formative years in New York City, and was a 1939 graduate of Hunter College High School. She appeared both on-and off-Broadway. Her film credits included The Stepford Wives, Bananas, Daniel, and Tomorrow Night. She appeared on such television and soap opera series as Naked City; Route 66; Car 54, Where Are You?; Law & Order; The Jackie Gleason Show; The Phil Silvers Show; Ryan's Hope; and Love Is a Many Splendored Thing.

== Union leadership ==
Greenhouse served as AFTRA' New York branch president for five terms, and on the Screen Actors Guild's National Board from 1981 to 1987. For her union service she was awarded the Founder's Award, the Ken Harvey Award and the George Heller Gold Card.

== Filmography ==
Year	Title	Role	Notes
1966	The Group	Mrs. Bergler	
1967	Up the Down Staircase	Alberta Kagan	
1970	Where's Poppa?	Owner of 'Happytime Farms'	
1971	Bananas	Dr. Feigen	
1975	The Stepford Wives	Mrs. Kirgassa	
1983	Daniel	Shelter Attendant	
1998	Tomorrow Night	Florence	
