= UNLV Rebels =

American athletic program

- University: University of Nevada, Las Vegas
- Nickname: None (1958–1968); Rebels (1969–present); Runnin' Rebels (1969–present: men's basketball)
- NCAA: Division I (FBS)
- Conference: Mountain West Conference
- Athletic director: Erick Harper
- Location: Paradise, Nevada
- Varsity teams: 16
- Football stadium: Allegiant Stadium
- Basketball arena: Thomas & Mack Center (men's); T-Mobile Arena (select events); Cox Pavilion (women's)
- Ice hockey arena: City National Arena
- Baseball stadium: Earl Wilson Stadium
- Soccer stadium: Peter Johann Soccer Field
- Colors: Scarlet and gray
- Mascot: The Shark (current), Hey Reb! (former)
- Fight song: "Win with the Rebels" and "UNLV Go Fight Win!"
- Website: unlvrebels.com/index.aspx
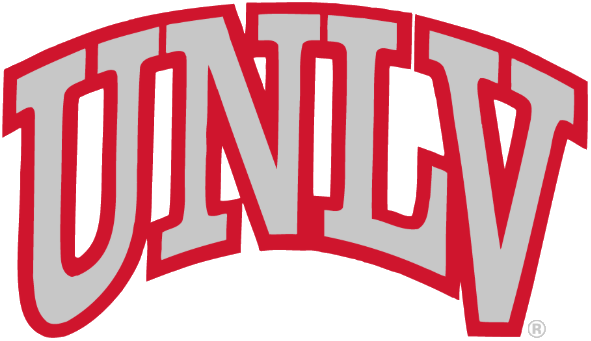

The UNLV Rebels are the intercollegiate athletics teams that represent the University of Nevada, Las Vegas (UNLV). The Rebels compete in the NCAA Division I (Football Bowl Subdivision for college football) as a member of the Mountain West Conference. The school's colors are scarlet and gray.

The University of Nevada, Las Vegas, was initially known as Nevada Southern when it was formed as a southern extension of the University of Nevada in 1958, and did not have a nickname or mascot for its athletic teams until 1968. Some of the Rebels teams use variations of the team name for their individual sports, such as the Runnin' Rebels for men's basketball and the Hustlin' Rebels for the baseball team.

The 1990 Runnin' Rebels basketball team defeated Duke University 103–73, to win the NCAA National Championship, UNLV's first Division I National Championship in one of the three major sports. The UNLV golf team won the school's second team National Championship in 1998. The Rebels also have won six individual national championships: two men's golf, two men's tennis, and two women's track and field.

== Sports sponsored ==
Men's sports	Women's sports
Baseball	Basketball
Basketball	Cross country
Football	Golf
Golf	Soccer
Soccer	Softball
Swimming and diving	Swimming and diving
Tennis	Tennis
Track and field^{†}	Track and field^{†}
	Volleyball
† – Track and field includes both indoor and outdoor.

=== Baseball ===
MWC in UNLV colors

Baseball retired numbers
Number	Player	Years
13	Fred Dallimore (Note: Served as coach for 23 seasons, compiling an overall record of 794–558–2 (.587). Dallimore also averaged a 34.5 wins per season.)	1974–1996
15	Matt Williams	1984–1986

The Hustlin' Rebels are the baseball team at UNLV and play their games at Earl E. Wilson Stadium at Roger Barnson Field which seats 3,000 and is on the UNLV campus. The stadium opened in 1994. In 1997, the infield playing surface was replaced and the outfield fences was replaced with a new fence that stands 12 ft high. In 2007 the stadium received a new playing surface. In 2010, the infield grass was replaced, new black padding was installed behind the backstop, a fresh halo was installed around the batting circle and the facility received a fresh coat of red paint. Future plans call for a new clubhouse, a new synthetic outfield surface, an overhang for the bleachers, a two-story press box, new batting cages and a video scoreboard to replace the scoreboard which was installed in 2009.

Famous Hustlin' Rebels include Marty Cordova, Cecil Fielder, Toby Hall, Ryan Ludwick, Todd Stottlemyre and Matt Williams.

=== Basketball ===
==== Men's basketball ====
The most decorated team at UNLV is the Runnin' Rebels men's basketball team, which plays in the Jerry Tarkanian Court at the Thomas & Mack Center on the UNLV campus, which seats 18,776 for basketball. (They may also play some games at T-Mobile Arena, which opened in 2016 and seats 20,000 for basketball.) The Thomas & Mack Center opened in 1983 and received a major interior and exterior renovation prior to the start of the 1999–2000 season. In 2005, the court was named in honor of former head coach Jerry "Tark the Shark" Tarkanian, who coached UNLV from 1973–92 and had a record of 509–105 (.829) during that run. 2008 saw the installation of all new visual equipment, including a four-sided center-hung LED widescreen scoreboard.

NCAA executive director Walter Byers famously disliked Tarkanian, and said "Tark’s black players play a fast city-lot basketball without much style. Grab ball and run like hell, not lots of passing to set up the shots.” Byers described UNLV’s style as “ghetto run-and-shoot basketball” with little concern for defense.

In 2008, ESPN.com released ESPN's Prestige Rankings, a method of ranking the best Division I men's college basketball programs since the 1984–85 season. Of the 300 teams ranked, the Runnin' Rebels came in at #8. In a list compiled by Forbes in 2010, UNLV earned mention among the nation's most valuable college basketball teams. The Rebels checked in at No. 20, with a listed team value of $12.9 million and a profit of $8.3 million this year. On the 2009 list, UNLV was No. 16. UNLV is one of two programs from outside of the six power conferences listed. UNLV also currently holds the NCAA record for most consecutive games with a made three-pointer. The Runnin' Rebels have made at least one three-point goal in each game since the rule was adopted universally for the 1986-87 season. The last time UNLV failed to make a three-pointer was January 25, 1986 against Long Beach State.

UNLV has also seen great success in the NCAA Tournament with .673 winning percentage in the tournament including four Final Four appearances and a national title in 1990 in a 103–73 runaway over Duke – the highest margin of victory in NCAA tournament championship game history. The Runnin' Rebels have the 7th-highest NCAA tournament winning percentage with a min. of 20 tournament games played. They also saw success at the NCAA Small College division having appeared in 4 NCAA Tournament appearances including national runner-up in 1968.

They have won 25 conference championships (11 regular season/14 tournament). including three Mountain West Conference Tournament championships, the most in the conference. The Runnin' Rebels have made 17 NCAA Division 1 Tournament appearances including 4 Final Four appearances. The 1991 Runnin' Rebels had been the last team to enter the NCAA Tournament unbeaten before Wichita State did it in 2014. The Runnin' Rebels have also appeared in three pre-season NIT tournaments, including two Final Fours and one pre-season NIT championship, and ten NIT tournaments, including one Final Four appearance.

Famous Runnin' Rebels include Greg Anthony, Stacey Augmon, Marcus Banks, Larry Johnson, Shawn Marion and Reggie Theus. The Runnin' Rebels have had three Olympians, four times including two Olympic bronze medalists, 18 All-Americans, 26 times, one John Wooden Award winner, and 12 NBA first round draft picks.

In 2010, UNLV announced the construction of the Mendenhall Center which will be the new practice home for the Runnin' Rebels. The Mendenhall Center broke ground in October 2010, will be attached to the south side of the COX Pavilion, and will have a total of 38,000 square feet (3,500 m^{2}) of space on three levels. Included will be two basketball courts, an academic area and film room, locker rooms, athletic training, strength and conditioning, and equipment areas. The facility will be complete in the Spring of 2011. The Lady Rebels will continue to practice on the lower level of the Cox Pavilion, which has its own women's locker facilities, player lounges and practice courts for women's basketball and volleyball.

==== Women's basketball ====
Women's basketball retired numbers
No.	Player	Career
4	Misty Thomas	1982–1986
13	Linda Fröhlich	1998–2002
50	Pauline Jordan	1987–1990

The Lady Rebels started play during the 1974–75 season and have an overall record of 652–385 (.629). They play their home games at Cox Pavilion which seats 2,500 and is on the UNLV campus (some games could be played at T-Mobile Arena, which opened in 2016 and whose capacity is 20,000). The state-of-the-art 78,000-square-foot (7,200 m^{2}), two-level facility opened in 2001. The structure is attached to the Thomas & Mack Center on both the concourse level and the practice level. They have appeared in eight NCAA tournaments, four AIAW tournaments, eight WNIT tournaments including one runner-up finish, have won nine conference championships (four regular season/five tournaments), have had nine All-Americans, 14 times, one National Freshman of the Year, five Conference MVPs and two Conference Freshman of the Year winners. Famous Lady Rebels include Pauline Jordan, Linda Fröhlich, Constance Jinks, and Sequoia Holmes who have all played in the WNBA.

=== Football ===
The UNLV Rebels football team plays at Allegiant Stadium, an off-campus stadium that seats 65,000 for football and is owned by Clark County and operated by the Las Vegas Raiders of the National Football League, who also play at the stadium. Before Allegiant Stadium the Rebels played at Sam Boyd Stadium in Whitney, Nevada from 1971 until 2019. Allegiant Stadium opened in 2020 after years of UNLV attempting to build a new stadium to replace Sam Boyd Stadium.

The Rebels practice on campus at the largest football practice facility in the country, the Fertitta Football Complex.

The Rebels were once a powerhouse in Division II before jumping to Division I-A (now Division I FBS) and have seen some trouble since their promotion. Although the Rebels have faced some adversity, they are one of the only teams to be undefeated in bowl games, winning the California Bowl in 1984 (subsequently forfeited due to ineligible players) and the Las Vegas Bowl twice, in 1994 and 2000. The Rebels have only won two conference championships in their history, both in the Big West Conference.

UNLV's football rivals include the University of Nevada, Reno, with whom UNLV plays in the annual "Battle for Nevada" in which the winner is awarded the Fremont Cannon; Hawaii (9th island pineapple trophy); and BYU, because of the large Mormon population in the Las Vegas metropolitan area.

The team has had nine All-Americans, 13 times, nine Conference MVPs, one Conference Student Athlete of the Year, three Conference Coaches of the Year, four Conference Freshman of the Year and two Freshman All-Americans. Famous players include Randall Cunningham, Suge Knight, Kenny Mayne, Keenan McCardell, Adam Seward and Ickey Woods. In July 2010, John Robinson became the first UNLV player or head coach enshrined in the College Football Hall of Fame.

=== Golf ===
==== Men's golf ====
The Rebels men's golf team is a perennial powerhouse in the NCAA, routinely making the top 25 every season. The Rebels home course is the par-72 Southern Highlands Golf Club which is rated as one of the top private clubs in the country. The course opened in 2000.

The golf team has won one team national title (1998) and has produced two individual national champions (Warren Schutte in 1991 and Ryan Moore in 2004), as well as ten conference championships (Big West: 1992, 1993, 1994, 1996; Mountain West: 2000, 2002, 2016, 2017, 2018, 2026), 21 consecutive NCAA berths, four NCAA West Regional titles, six conference individual titles, 21 All-Americans (39 times), three NCAA Regional medalists, two National Coach of the Year awards, one Ben Hogan Award winner, one Jack Nicklaus Award winner, one Haskins Award winner, one Golfstat Award winner, one National Freshman of the Year, 10 Conference MVPs and two Conference Freshman of the Year winners. The golf program has turned out numerous PGA Tour pros, including Ryan Moore, Chad Campbell, Chris Riley, Adam Scott, Charley Hoffman, Derek Ernst, Bill Lunde, Skip Kendall, and Andres Gonzales.

==== Women's golf ====
The Lady Rebels golf team began its inaugural season during the 2001–02 academic year and has won 3 Conference championships, have three NCAA Finals appearances, have seven NCAA regional appearances, one NCAA individual appearance, three All-Americans, five times, three conference MVPs, three Conference Freshman of the Years, and two Conference Coach of the Years. The Rebels' home course is the par-72 Dragon Ridge Country Club at MacDonald Highlands which opened in 2000.

=== Soccer ===
==== Men's soccer ====
Men's soccer retired numbers
No.	Player(s)	Career
10	David Cohen (Note: The number was retired in honor of both players who wore it.)
10	Rob Ryerson	1983–1985

The men's and women's soccer teams play at Robert J. Miller Soccer Building and Peter F. Johann Memorial Soccer Field, respectively, which seats 2,500 and is located on the UNLV campus. The Memorial Soccer Field opened in 1983 and the Soccer Building opened in 1990. In 2006, the entire field was replaced. The men's soccer team competes in the Western Athletic Conference, while the women compete in the Mountain West.

The men's team has made five NCAA tournament appearances, has won four conference championships, one conference tournament championship, have had five All-Americans, have had 5 Conference MVPs, two Conference Coach of the Years and one Conference Freshman of the Year. Dating back to 1975, the men's soccer team has had the support of Las Vegas businessman, Ken Johann and his wife Alice. After the passing of their son Peter from a sports-related accident, they decided to honor their son with a memorial scholarship that is given out every year. The Peter Johann Memorial Scholarship assists one student-athlete who demonstrates excellence in six areas: academic performance, techniques and tactics of soccer, team loyalty, cooperation, leadership and endurance.

==== Women's soccer ====
The women's soccer team has appeared in three NCAA tournaments, has won two conference championships, two conference tournament championships, has had three Conference MVPs and two Conference Coach of the Years.

=== Softball ===
The Rebel softball team plays at Eller Media Stadium at Jim Rogers Field which seats 770 and is on the UNLV campus. The stadium opened in 2002. They have appeared in nine NCAA tournaments, have three College World Series berths, one conference title, have had 12 All-Americans, 20 times, one Olympian, three times including one Olympic gold medalist, three times, two Conference Coach of the Years, five times, four Conference MVPs, five times, two Conference Pitchers of the Year, and one Conference Freshman of the Year. Famous former Lady Rebels include Lori Harrigan.

=== Swimming and diving ===
==== Men's swimming and diving ====
The men's swimming and diving team train at the Buchanan Natatorium, which seats approximately 1,200 people. The UNLV Natatorium opened in 1974. It was renamed the Buchanan Natatorium in 1980, in honor of the former Nevada System Board of Regent James L. "Bucky" Buchanan II.

The team has won 10 conference championships in the past 11 years. They also have had 20 All-Americans, 11 conference MVPs and eight conference Coaches of the Year. The men compete in the Western Athletic Conference while the women compete in the Mountain West Conference.

==== Women's swimming and diving ====
The women's squad has won one conference championship, four conference tournament championships, has had seven All Americans, 16 times, has had 15 Conference MVPs and four Conference Coach of the Years.

Both teams share a training facility, Buchanan Natatorium, as well as coaching staff. Head Coach Jim Reitz retained his position for 36 years, since starting the program, before retiring in 2015.

=== Tennis ===
==== Men's tennis ====
The men's and women's tennis squads compete at the Frank and Vicki Fertitta Tennis Complex which seats 2,000 and is on the UNLV campus. The facility opened in 1993 and features 12 lighted courts and a stadium club. The men's tennis team has had two NCAA individual national champions, has three Collegiate Grand Slam titles, has made seven NCAA tournament appearance, has won four Conference championships, has had five All-Americans, nine times, six Conference MVPs, three Conference Coaches of the Year and two Conference Freshman of the Years. Won conference in 2016.

==== Women's tennis ====
The women's squad has made 8 NCAA tournament appearances, has won two conference championship, three Conference tournament championships, has had three All-Americans, five times, has had one National Rookie of the Year, eight Conference MVPs, one Conference Student Athlete of the Year, three Conference Freshman of the Years and two Conference Coaches of the Year.

=== Women's track and field ===
The cross county and track and field teams compete at the Myron Partridge Stadium at Sheila Tarr Smith Field which seats 1,000 and is on the UNLV campus. The stadium opened in 1998. They have had two NCAA individual national champions, have won five Conference outdoor championships, one conference indoor championship, have had two Olympians, three times, have had 44 All-Americans, 83 times and have had one U.S. Olympic Head Coach.

=== Women's volleyball ===
The women's volleyball team competes at the COX Pavilion which seats 2,500 and is on the UNLV campus. The state-of-the-art 78,000-square-foot (7,200 m^{2}), two-level facility opened in 2001. The Rebels have made four NCAA tournament appearances. The team played from 1978 to 1980, 1984–1985 and was then restarted in 1996. No teams were fielded from 1981 to 1983 and from 1986 to 1995.

== Cheer and dance ==
The UNLV Cheerleaders and the UNLV Rebel Girls & Company (RG & Co.) are fixtures at football games as well as Runnin' Rebel and Lady Rebel basketball games. The teams perform at a variety of UNLV events, conventions and shows and appear at numerous events throughout the Las Vegas community. The cheer team has been featured in an ESPN SportsCenter commercial. Both groups appeared together with members of the Star Of Nevada Marching Band during a taping of Live with Regis and Kelly while the show was in Las Vegas.

The cheer group stunt team won the national title in 2010, and the Rebel Girls & Company won the national title for the second time in three years in the Hip Hop-4-year college division. The cheer partner team won the national championships in 2005 and 2006 and the small co-ed team won the title in 2005. In 2008, the Rebel Girls & Company finished third in the nation in the UCA/UDA Cheerleading and Dance Team National Championships in the Division 1A Hip Hop category. The RG & Co won two ICU World Championships Representing as the USA’s National Team. They’ve also won numerous Division 1A titles in Hip Hop and Game Day at the UDA Dance Team National Championship.

== NCAA team championships ==
UNLV has won two NCAA team national championships.

- Men's (2)
  - Basketball (1): 1990
  - Golf (1): 1998
- See also:
  - Mountain West Conference NCAA team championships
  - List of NCAA schools with the most NCAA Division I championships

== Equipment, marketing, strength & conditioning and sports medicine ==
=== Apparel ===
In 2008, Nike and UNLV entered into a contract that makes Nike the exclusive product supplier and sponsor of all UNLV athletic teams. UNLV signed two five-year contracts and one three-year deal with the shoemaker to handle its athletic apparel and shoe needs that is valued at $3 million over the course of the agreements. UNLV's three-year deal covers men's basketball for $155,000 per year for a combined value of $465,000. The five-year contracts are for football ($230,000 annually, $1.15 million total) and all other sports ($277,000 and $1.385 million). Previous to the new contract, UNLV used a combination of Nike, Russell Athletic, and Adidas for its shoes and apparel.

=== Marketing ===
In 2007, the UNLV Athletics Department and International Sports Properties, Inc. (ISP Sports) agreed to work together with UNLV's multi-media rights and corporate sales and sponsorship development for athletics, special events and entertainment. The partnership will guarantee UNLV Athletics more than $32 million over the next 10 years that will go into its athletics and entertainment venues as well as enhancing the visibility of its sponsors and advertisers. Three elements make up the royalty from ISP to UNLV: annual guaranteed rights fees, signage stipends, and revenue sharing of totals in excess of defined thresholds.

In 2010, the UNLV Athletics Department and Justice Entertainment Group (JEG) agreed to form a relationship to book and market special events hosted in the Thomas & Mack Center, Cox Pavilion and Sam Boyd Stadium. The partnership will help to protect the university's current revenue streams as well as create new ones and bring additional resources to enhance UNLV's special events and athletic events.

=== Television package ===
The Mountain West Conference television package reaches a national audience through a combination of telecasts on The Mountain West Sports Network (The Mtn.), CBS Sports Network and NBCSN. CBSSN and NBCSN are available nationally on Dish Network and DirecTV. Additionally, CBSSN can be seen on AT&T U-verse. 2010–2011 saw a handful of MWC men's basketball games on CBS.

== Olympians ==
Through the 2008 Summer Olympics in Beijing, 13 UNLV student-athletes had participated in the Olympics. The university has had medal-winning alumni in each of the last three Olympiads. A total of nine countries, including the U.S. have been represented by UNLV athletes. One athlete has been to three Olympics and four have been two-time Olympians.

The total number of medals won by UNLV athletes is five, including three gold (all in women's softball) and two bronze (both in men's basketball).

Last	First	Year	Sport	Event	Medal	Country
Andersson	Jonas	2008	Swimming	100m Breaststroke		Sweden
Andersson	Jonas	2008	Swimming	4 × 100 m Relay (Medley)		Sweden
Augmon	Stacey	1988	Basketball		(bronze); Bronze	United States
Bartoch	Joe	2008	Swimming	100m Butterfly		Canada
Diaconescu	Ioana	2000	Swimming	4 × 100 m Relay (Freestyle)		Romania
Diaconescu	Ioana	2000	Swimming	4 × 200 m Relay (Freestyle)		Romania
Diaconescu	Ioana	2000	Swimming	4 × 100 m Relay (Medley)		Romania
Dickel	Mark	2000	Basketball			New Zealand
Dickel	Mark	2004	Basketball			New Zealand
Harrigan	Lori	1996	Softball		(gold); Gold	United States
Harrigan	Lori	2000	Softball		(gold); Gold	United States
Harrigan	Lori	2004	Softball		(gold); Gold	United States
Hortness	Richard	2008	Swimming	50m Freestyle		Canada
Hutchinson	Ayanna	2000	Track and Field	100m		Trinidad and Tobago
Hutchinson	Ayanna	2004	Track and Field	100m		Trinidad and Tobago
Hutchinson	Ayanna	2004	Track and Field	4 × 100 m relay		Trinidad and Tobago
Livingston	Andrew	2000	Swimming	100m Butterfly		Puerto Rico
Livingston	Andrew	2000	Swimming	200m Butterfly		Puerto Rico
Livingston	Andrew	2004	Swimming	200m Butterfly		Puerto Rico
Marion	Shawn	2004	Basketball		(bronze); Bronze	United States
Mintenko	Mike	2000	Swimming	100m Butterfly		Canada
Mintenko	Mike	2000	Swimming	4 × 200 m Relay (Freestyle)		Canada
Mintenko	Mike	2000	Swimming	4 × 100 m Relay (Medley)		Canada
Mintenko	Mike	2004	Swimming			Canada
Perri	Tista	2000	Baseball			Italy
Simon	Jacint	2000	Swimming	4 × 200 m Relay (Freestyle)		Hungary
Tyson	Alicia	2000	Track and Field			Trinidad and Tobago

== Club sports ==
=== Hockey ===
The UNLV Skatin' Rebels hockey team plays at City National Arena, an off-campus, 600-seat arena owned by the Vegas Golden Knights of the National Hockey League and the Howard Hughes Corporation. Prior to City National Arena's opening, the team played at Las Vegas Ice Center and Pepsi Ice Arena, splitting time between the two rinks. The move to City National Arena allowed the Rebels to move the program up to American Collegiate Hockey Association Division I. The team began play in 2005.

The Rebels are one-time ACHA Men’s Division I National Champions, beating Adrian College in the 2024–25 final at the Centene Community Ice Center in St. Louis. The team reached the national final for the first time the previous year during the 2023–24 season, but lost to Adrian.

On December 28, 2024, the Rebels defeated the University of Denver, the defending NCAA Division I men's ice hockey tournament champions, in an exhibition game, 7–6, via shootout.
