= Steve Carell =

American actor and comedian (born 1962)

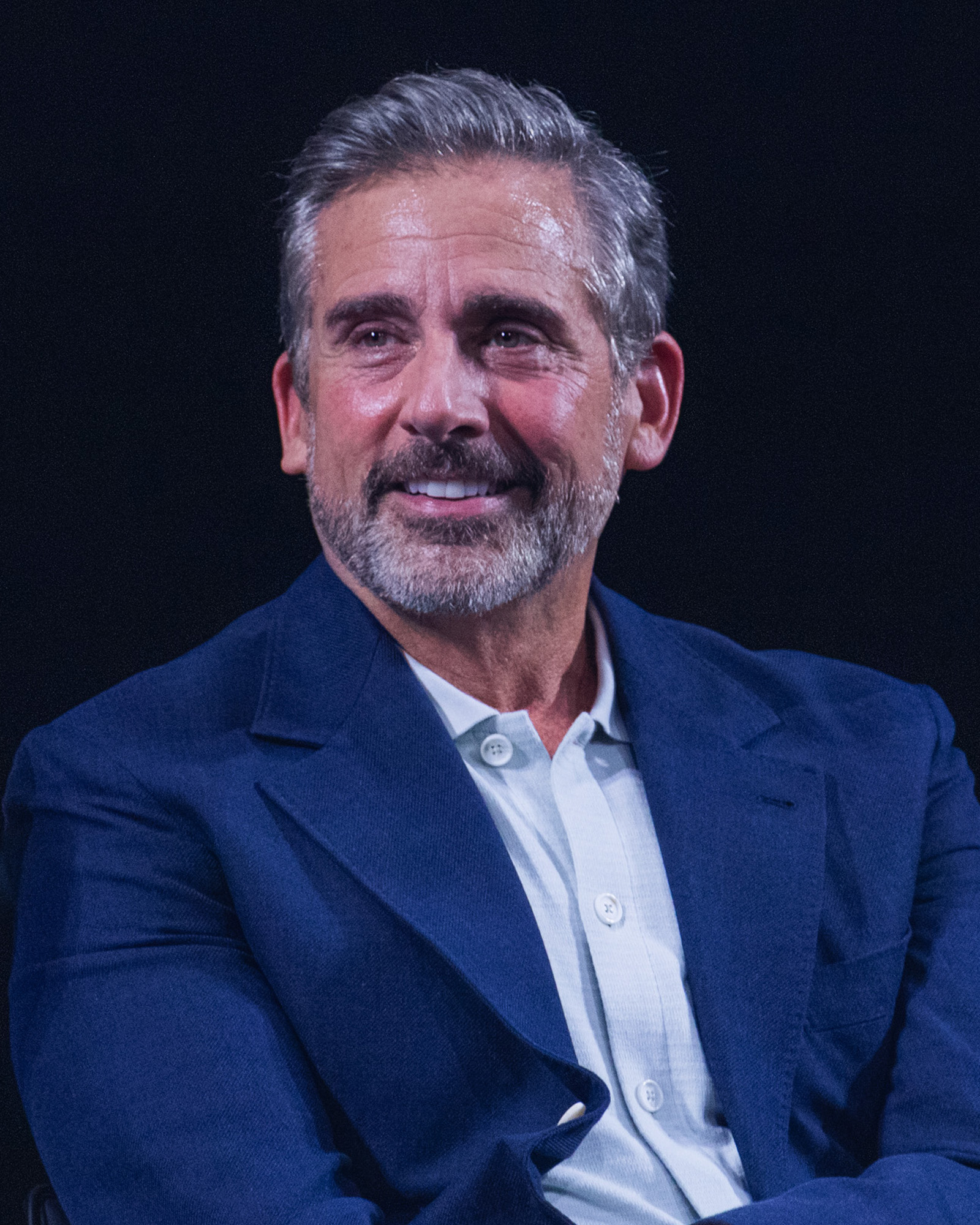
- Carell in 2025
- Born: Steven John Carell; August 16, 1962 (age 64); Concord, Massachusetts, U.S.
- Education: Denison University (BA)
- Occupations: Actor; comedian; screenwriter; producer
- Years active: 1989–present
- Spouse: Nancy Walls (m. 1995)
- Children: 2
- Awards: Full list

Steven John Carell (/kəˈrɛl/; born August 16, 1962) is an American actor, comedian, screenwriter, and producer. He starred as Michael Scott in the NBC sitcom The Office (2005–2011, 2013), and also worked at several points as a producer, executive producer, writer, and director. Carell has received numerous accolades, including a Golden Globe Award for The Office. He was recognized as "America's Funniest Man" by Life.

Carell gained recognition as a cast member on The Dana Carvey Show in 1996 and as a correspondent on The Daily Show with Jon Stewart from 1999 to 2005. He went on to star in several comedy films, including Anchorman: The Legend of Ron Burgundy (2004) and its 2013 sequel, as well as The 40-Year-Old Virgin (2005), Evan Almighty (2007), Get Smart (2008), Date Night (2010), Crazy, Stupid, Love (2011), and The Way, Way Back (2013). He also voice acted in Over the Hedge (2006), Horton Hears a Who! (2008) and the Despicable Me franchise (2010–present).

Carell transitioned his career to taking more dramatic roles including his portrayal of John du Pont in Foxcatcher (2014), which earned him nominations for the Academy Award for Best Actor and the BAFTA Award for Best Actor in a Supporting Role. He also starred in Little Miss Sunshine (2006), The Big Short (2015), and Battle of the Sexes (2017), the last two earning him his eighth and ninth Golden Globe Award nominations, respectively. Other films include Café Society (2016), Last Flag Flying (2017), Vice (2018), Beautiful Boy (2018), and Asteroid City (2023).

Carell returned to television as the co-creator of the comedy series Angie Tribeca (2016–2018), which he developed with his wife, Nancy Carell. He starred as morning anchor Mitch Kessler in the Apple TV+ drama series The Morning Show (2019–present), for which he received a Primetime Emmy Award nomination. He also starred in Netflix sitcom Space Force (2020–2022), the FX on Hulu limited series The Patient (2022), and the HBO comedy-drama Rooster (2026-present), for which he received another Primetime Emmy Award nomination. He made his Broadway debut playing the title role in the Lincoln Center Theatre revival of Anton Chekov's Uncle Vanya (2024).

== Early life and education ==
Carell was born on August 16, 1962, in Concord, Massachusetts. His father, Edwin A. Carell (1925–2021), was a mechanical engineer, and his mother, Harriet Theresa (née Koch; 1925–2016), was a psychiatric nurse. Carell's maternal uncle, Stanley Koch, worked with scientist Allen B. DuMont to create improved cathode ray tubes. His father was of Italian and German descent and his mother was of Polish ancestry. His father's surname was originally Caroselli but it was changed to Carell in the 1950s.

Carell was raised Catholic and was educated at Nashoba Brooks School, The Fenn School, and Middlesex School. He played ice hockey and lacrosse while in high school. He also played the fife, performing with other members of his family, and later joined a reenacting group portraying the 10th Regiment of Foot. He attributed his interest in history to this, earning a degree in the subject from Denison University in Granville, Ohio, in 1984.

While at Denison, Carell was a member of Burpee's Seedy Theatrical Company, a student-run improvisational comedy troupe, and was a goalie on the school's Big Red hockey team for four years. He also spent time as a disc jockey under the name "Sapphire Steve Carell" at WDUB, the campus radio station.

== Career ==
=== 1989–2005: Early work and late night ===
Carell stated that he worked as a USPS mail carrier in Littleton, Massachusetts. However, Carell quit after seven months because his boss told him he was not very good at the job and needed to be faster. Early in his performing career, Carell acted onstage in a touring children's theater company, later in the comedy musical Knat Scatt Private Eye, and in a television commercial for the restaurant chain Brown's Chicken in 1989.

==== The Dana Carvey Show (1996) ====
In 1991, Carell performed with Chicago troupe The Second City where Stephen Colbert was his understudy for a time. Carell made his film debut in a minor role in Curly Sue. In spring 1996 he was a cast member of The Dana Carvey Show, a short-lived sketch comedy program on ABC. Along with fellow cast member Colbert, Carell provided the voice of Gary, half of The Ambiguously Gay Duo, the Robert Smigel-produced animated short which continued on Saturday Night Live later that year. While the program lasted only seven episodes, The Dana Carvey Show has since been credited with forging Carell's career. He starred in a few short-lived television series, including Come to Papa and Over the Top. He has made numerous guest appearances, including in "Funny Girl," an episode of Just Shoot Me! Additional screen credits include Brad Hall's short-lived situation comedy Watching Ellie (2002–2003) and Woody Allen's Melinda and Melinda.

==== The Daily Show (1999–2005) ====
Carell was a correspondent for The Daily Show from 1999 to 2005, with several regular segments including "Even Stevphen" with Stephen Colbert and "Produce Pete."

=== 2004–2013: The Office and comedic roles ===
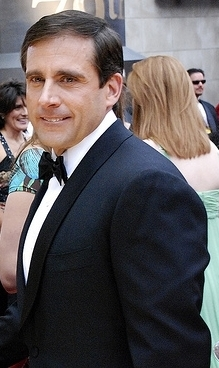
Carell at the 2007 Academy Awards

After a minor role in Bruce Almighty in 2003 as the smug newscaster Evan Baxter, Carell's first major film role was as weatherman Brick Tamland in the 2004 hit comedy Anchorman: The Legend of Ron Burgundy. Struck by Carell's performance in the film, Anchorman producer Judd Apatow approached Carell about creating a film together, and Carell told him about an idea he had involving a middle-aged man who is still a virgin. The result was the 2005 film The 40-Year-Old Virgin, which Carell and Apatow developed and wrote together, starring Carell as the title character. The film made $109 million in domestic box office sales and established him as a leading man. It also earned Carell an MTV Movie Award for Best Comedic Performance and a WGA Award nomination, along with Apatow, for Best Original Screenplay.

In 2005, Carell signed a deal with NBC to star in The Office, a remake of the British television series of the same name which was created by Ricky Gervais and Stephen Merchant. Developed by Greg Daniels this series, shot mockumentary-style, revolves around life at a mid-sized paper supply company. Carell played the role of Michael Scott, the immature, idiosyncratic regional manager of Dunder Mifflin, in Scranton, Pennsylvania. Although the first season of the adaptation suffered mediocre ratings, NBC renewed it for another season due to the anticipated success of Carell's film The 40-Year-Old Virgin, and the series subsequently became a raging success. Carell won a Golden Globe Award and TCA Award in 2006 for his role in The Office. He received six consecutive Primetime Emmy Award for Outstanding Lead Actor in a Comedy Series nominations for his work in the series (2006–2011). Carell earned approximately US$175,000 per episode of the third season of The Office, twice his salary for the previous two seasons. In an Entertainment Weekly interview, he commented on his salary, saying, "You don't want people to think you're a pampered jerk. Salaries can be ridiculous. On the other hand, a lot of people are making a lot of money off of these shows."

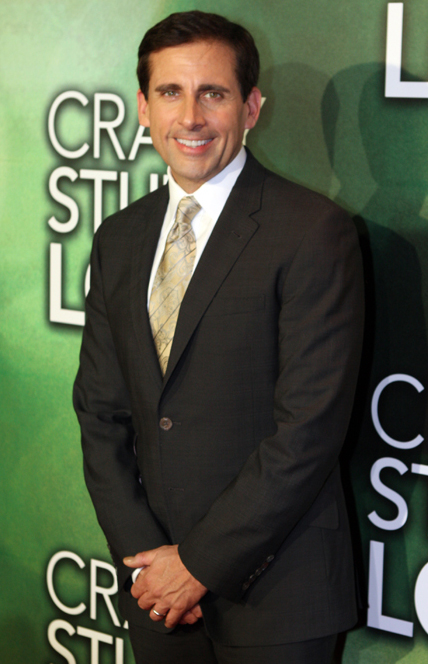
Carell at the premiere of Crazy, Stupid, Love, 2011

Carell played Uncle Arthur, imitating the camp mannerisms of Paul Lynde's original character, in Bewitched, a film adaptation of the television series of the same name co-starring Nicole Kidman and Will Ferrell. He also voiced Hammy the Squirrel in the 2006 animated film, Over the Hedge and Ned McDodd, the mayor of Whoville, in the 2008 animated film Horton Hears a Who! He starred in Little Miss Sunshine during 2006, as Uncle Frank. His work in the films Anchorman, The 40-Year-Old Virgin, and Bewitched established Carell as a member of Hollywood's so-called "Frat Pack," a group of actors who often appear in films together, that also includes Ben Stiller, Owen Wilson, Will Ferrell, Jack Black, Vince Vaughn, Paul Rudd, and Luke Wilson. Carell acted as the title character of Evan Almighty, a sequel to Bruce Almighty, reprising his role as Evan Baxter, now a U.S. Congressman. The film received mostly negative reviews. Carell starred in the 2007 film Dan in Real Life, co-starring Dane Cook and Juliette Binoche. Carell played Maxwell Smart in the 2008 film Get Smart, an adaptation of the television series starring Don Adams. It was successful, grossing over $230 million worldwide. During 2007, he was invited to join the Academy of Motion Picture Arts and Sciences.

Carell was allowed "flex time" during filming to work on theatrical films. Carell worked on Evan Almighty during a production hiatus during the second season of The Office. Production ended during the middle of the fourth season of The Office because of Carell's and others' refusal to cross the picket line of the 2007 Writers Guild of America strike. Carell, a WGA member, has written two episodes of The Office: "Casino Night" and "Survivor Man." Both episodes were praised, and Carell won a Writers Guild of America Award for "Casino Night." On April 29, 2010, Carell stated he would be leaving the show when his contract expired at the conclusion of the 2010–2011 season because he wanted to focus on his film career. However, according to interviews in The Office: The Untold Story of the Greatest Sitcom of the 2000s, Carell did not actually plan to leave at the time and was only "thinking out loud" during the interview, but after his statement failed to elicit a reaction from NBC, he decided it was best to move on.

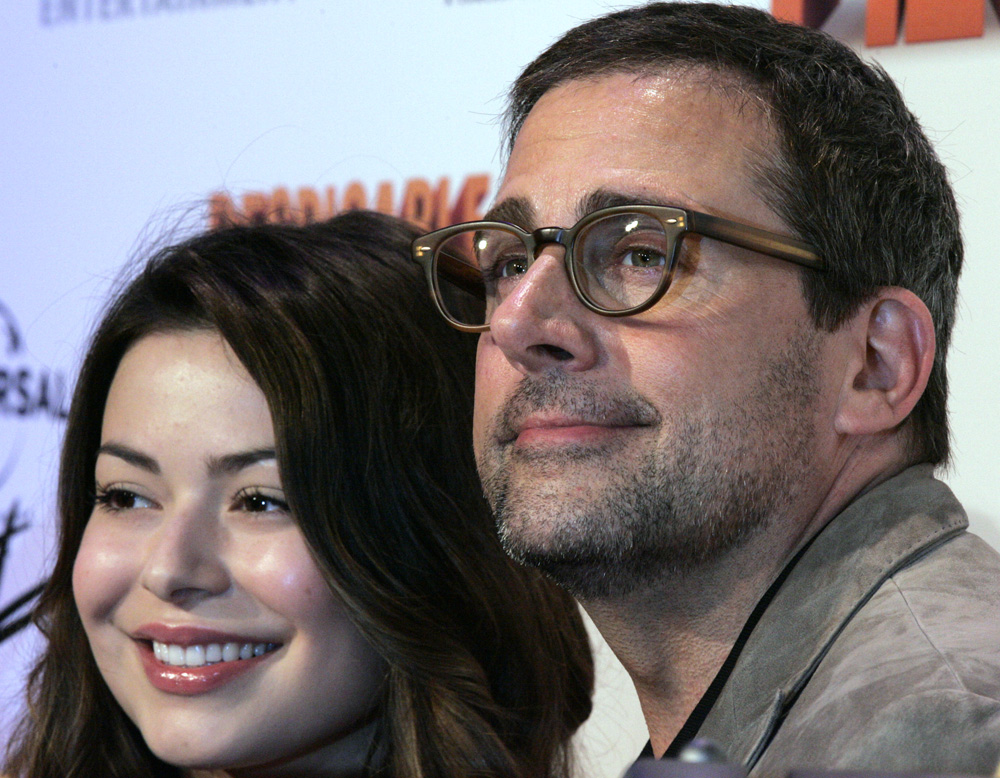
Co-star Miranda Cosgrove and Carell at a premiere for Despicable Me 2, June 2013

In 2010, Carell starred with Tina Fey in Date Night and voiced Gru, the main character in the Universal CGI film Despicable Me along with Miranda Cosgrove, Kristen Wiig, and Julie Andrews. He reprised the role in the 2013 sequel Despicable Me 2, the third Despicable Me 3 in 2017, and fourth Despicable Me 4 in 2024. In 2008, Carousel signed a first look deal with Warner Bros. In 2009, his production company Carousel Productions launched a television arm and signed a deal with Universal Media Studios. He has several other projects in the works, including a remake of the 1967 Peter Sellers film The Bobo. He is doing voice-over work in commercials for Wrigley's Extra gum. Carell has launched a television division of his production company, Carousel Productions, which has contracted a three-year overall deal with Universal Media Studios, the studio behind his NBC comedy series. Thom Hinkle and Campbell Smith of North South Prods., former producers on Comedy Central's The Daily Show, were hired to manage Carousel's TV operations.

His last episode as a main character in The Office, "Goodbye, Michael," aired April 28, 2011, with his final shot showing Michael returning his microphone to the fictional documentary crew, before walking to a Colorado-bound plane to join his fiancée, Holly Flax, in Boulder, Colorado. His final line in this episode, to Pam Beesly, is thus unheard. Although he was invited back for the series finale in 2013, Carell originally declined believing that it would go against his character's arc. Ultimately Carell did reprise the role briefly in the series finale. Also in 2013 Carell acted in the summer coming-of-age comedy The Way, Way Back starring Sam Rockwell, Maya Rudolph, and Allison Janney. Carell was asked about participating in a revival of the series in 2018, during the press day for Welcome to Marwen, Carell told Collider reporter Christina Radish, "I'll tell you, no... The show is way more popular now than when it was on the air. I just can't see it being the same thing, and I think most folks would want it to be the same thing, but it wouldn't be. Ultimately, I think it's maybe best to leave well enough alone and just let it exist as what it was...I just wouldn't want to make the mistake of making a less good version of it. The odds wouldn't be in its favor, in terms of it recapturing exactly what it was, the first time."

=== 2014–2018: Dramatic film roles ===
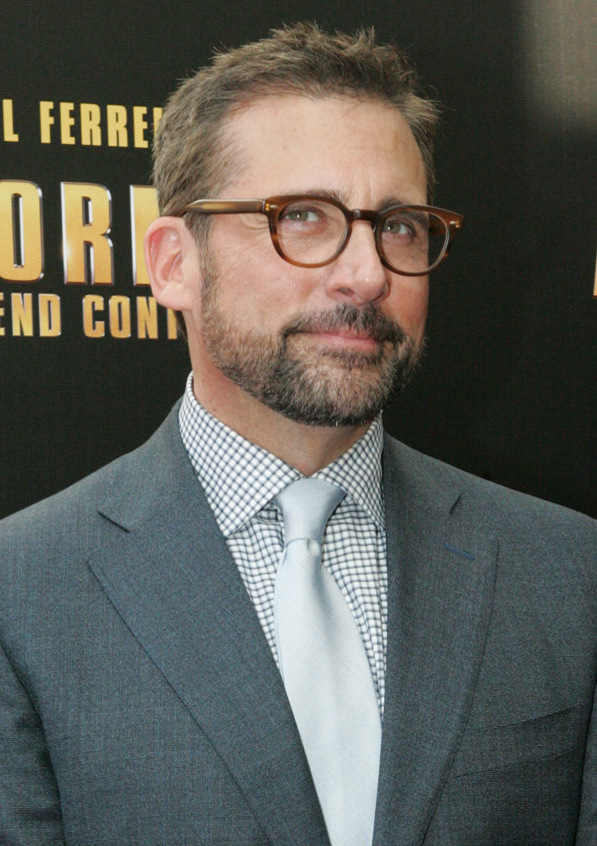
Carell at the Australian premiere of Anchorman 2: The Legend Continues (2014)

In 2014, Carell starred in the true crime drama film Foxcatcher alongside Mark Ruffalo and Channing Tatum in which Carell played the millionaire and convicted murderer John Eleuthère du Pont. It premiered at the Cannes Film Festival. Carell was nominated for the Golden Globe for Best Actor and the Academy Award for Best Actor. In 2015, Carell reprised his role as Gru for a cameo appearance in the film Minions. Carell played activist Steven Goldstein in the gay rights drama Freeheld, replacing Zach Galifianakis, who dropped out due to scheduling conflicts. The film co-stars Julianne Moore, Elliot Page, and Michael Shannon, and was released in October 2015.

He followed this with another biographical drama, The Big Short, in which he portrayed banker Steve Eisman, whose name was changed in the film to Mark Baum. Directed by Adam McKay, the film stars Christian Bale, Ryan Gosling, and Brad Pitt, and it was released in December 2015. The film earned Carell a Golden Globe Award nomination for Best Actor. The film was also nominated for the Academy Award for Best Picture. The following year he replaced Bruce Willis in Woody Allen's Café Society (2016), alongside Kristen Stewart and Jesse Eisenberg. The film premiered at the 69th Cannes Film Festival opening the festival. The film's consensus on Rotten Tomatoes reads, "Café Society's lovely visuals and charming performances round out a lightweight late-period Allen comedy whose genuine pleasures offset its amiable predictability." In 2017, Carell headlined the biographical comedy-drama Battle of the Sexes, portraying tennis star Bobby Riggs, with Emma Stone co-starring as Billie Jean King. The film earned both Carell and Stone Golden Globe nominations. Carell also starred as Larry "Doc" Shepherd in the war comedy-drama film Last Flag Flying directed by Richard Linklater starring Laurence Fishburne and Bryan Cranston.

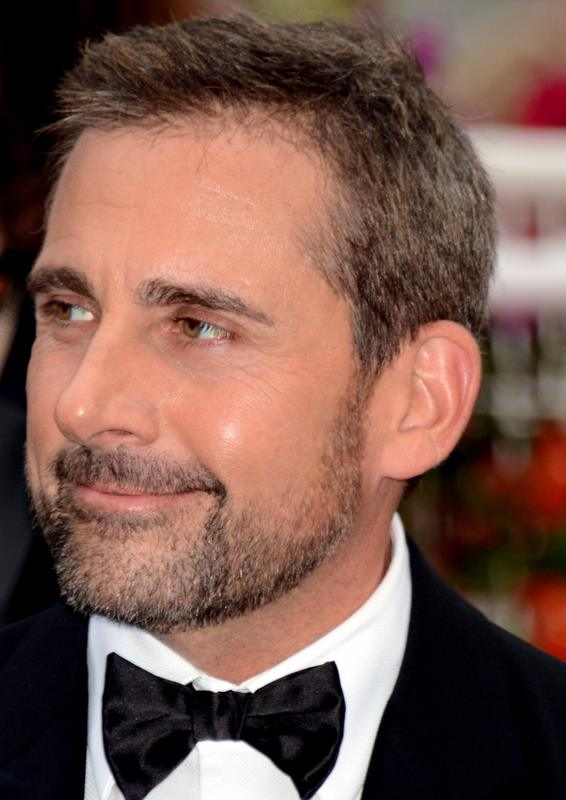
Carell at the 2014 Cannes Film Festival

In 2018, Carell starred in three films. He led the addiction drama Beautiful Boy as real life father David Sheff, whose son Nic (Timothée Chalamet) struggles with drug addiction. He also played Donald Rumsfeld in Adam McKay's political satire, Vice, about the life of former Vice President Dick Cheney (Christian Bale). The film received mixed reviews, and went on to be nominated for eight Academy Awards, including Best Picture. His third 2018 role was starring as Mark Hogancamp of Marwencol in Robert Zemeckis' Welcome to Marwen. The film received a 32% on Rotten Tomatoes, with the critical consensus reading, "Welcome to Marwen has dazzling effects and a sadly compelling story, but the movie's disjointed feel and clumsy screenplay make this invitation easy to decline." The movie was a box office failure, grossing $12.7 million against a budget of around $49 million.

=== 2019–present: Career expansion ===
In 2019, Carell returned to television to star in the Apple TV+ drama series The Morning Show opposite Reese Witherspoon and Jennifer Aniston. Carell played Mitch Kessler, a morning news show anchor who is struggling to maintain relevance after being fired due to a sexual misconduct accusation. The Morning Show received a two-season order from Apple. The first season premiered in the fall of 2019 and the second season premiered in 2020. For his performance in the first season, Carell was nominated for the Primetime Emmy Award for Outstanding Lead Actor in a Drama Series, his eleventh Emmy nomination overall. Carell had originally signed a one-year deal with Apple to star in the first season only but he signed on to star in the second season in October 2019.

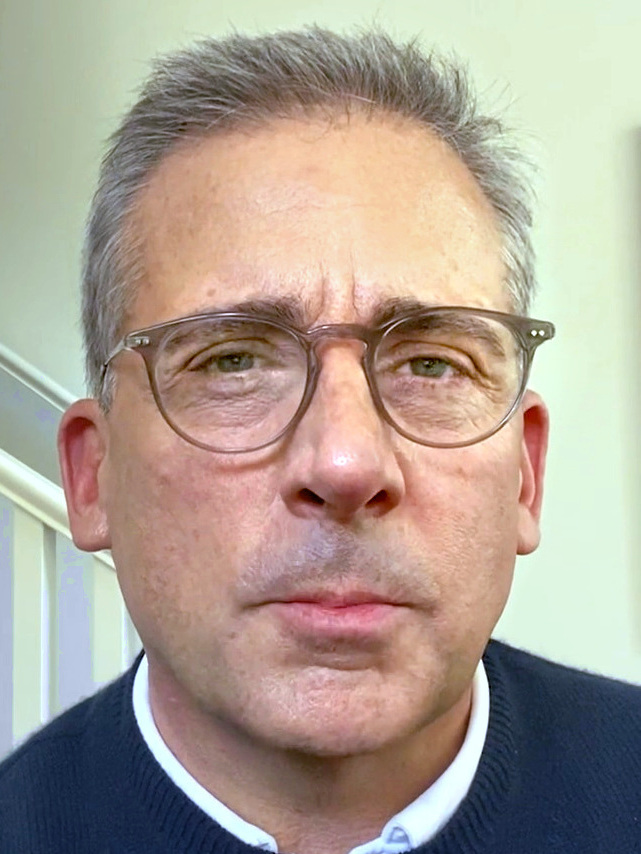
Steve Carell in 2021

Since May 2020, Carell also starred in the Netflix workplace comedy series Space Force, based on the proposed space warfare service branch of the United States Armed Forces: the United States Space Force. Carell created and produces Space Force with Greg Daniels, who created and produced The Office. Carell also wrote the pilot episode with Daniels. The show was renewed for a second season in November 2020. Carell starred in the political comedy film Irresistible, written and directed by Jon Stewart. The film was initially set for a theatrical release in May 2020. Due to the COVID-19 pandemic in the United States, the film was released on Premium VOD and selected theaters on June 26, 2020. In 2022, Carell reprised his role as Gru in the film Minions: The Rise of Gru. He also starred in (and served as executive producer for) FX on Hulu's ten-episode original series The Patient; in that series, Carell portrays a therapist who is imprisoned by a serial killer who wants to resist the urge to kill. Carell replaced Bill Murray, who contracted COVID-19, in Wes Anderson's Asteroid City (2023).

In 2023, it was announced that Carell would be making his Broadway debut as the title role in the Lincoln Center revival of Anton Chekov's Uncle Vanya at the Vivian Beaumont Theater. The production was directed by Lila Neugebauer and Carell starred alongside Alison Pill, William Jackson Harper, Alfred Molina, Anika Noni Rose and Jayne Houdyshell.

== Personal life ==
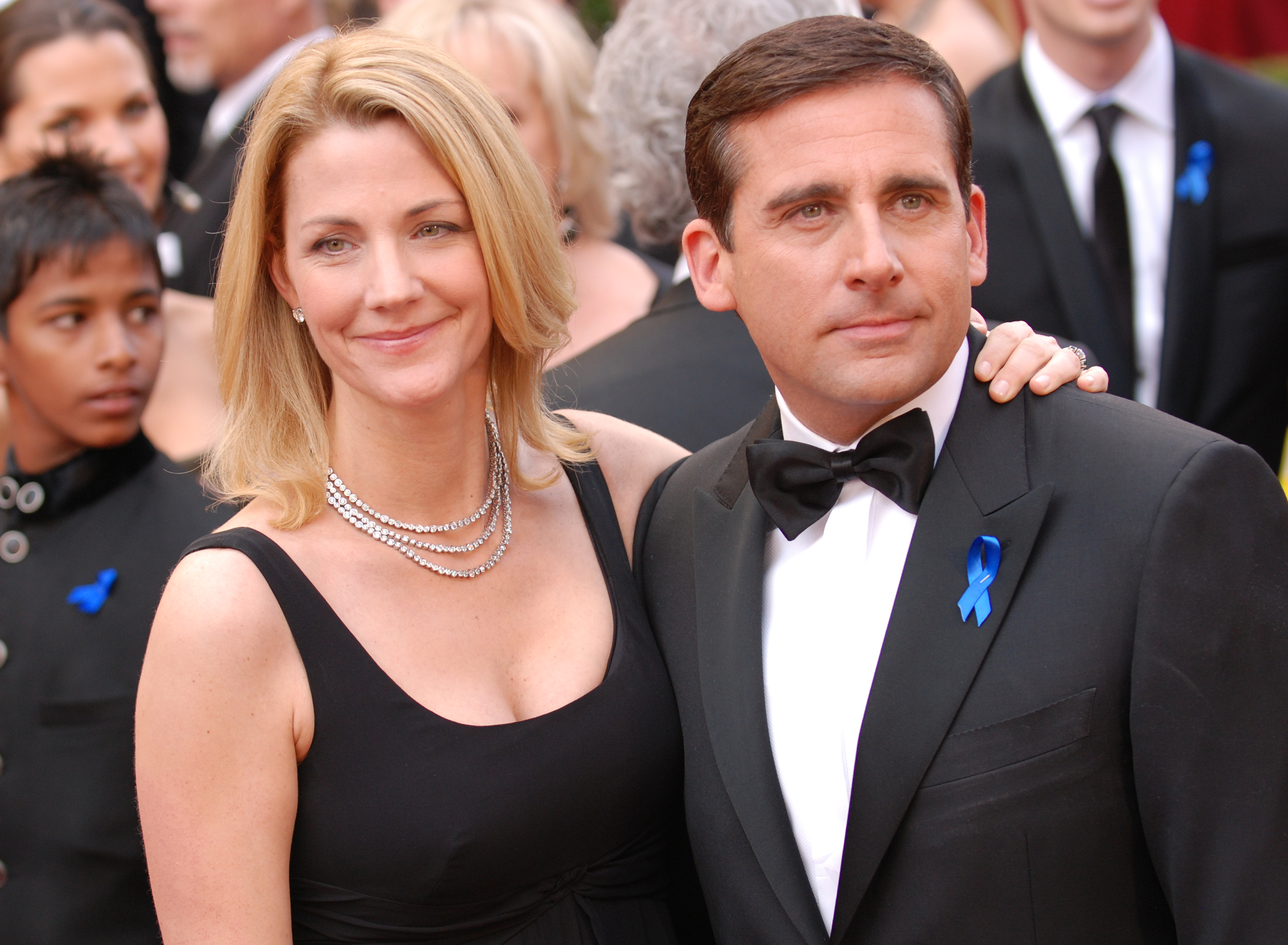
Carell and his wife Nancy at the 2010 Academy Awards

On August 5, 1995, Carell married former Saturday Night Live cast member Nancy Walls, whom he met when she was a student in an improv class he was teaching at The Second City Training Center. They have a daughter named Elisabeth Anne (born May 2001) and a son named John (born June 2004). Their daughter graduated from, and their son attends, Northwestern University. On June 15, 2025, Carell received an honorary Doctor of Arts degree from Northwestern.

Carell and his wife have appeared together in the comedy films The 40-Year-Old Virgin and Seeking a Friend for the End of the World, as well as the comedy series The Daily Show and The Office. They also co-created the comedy series Angie Tribeca.

In February 2009, Carell purchased the Marshfield Hills General Store in Marshfield, Massachusetts.

In an interview with 60 Minutes, Carell cited George Carlin, John Cleese, Bill Cosby, Steve Martin, and Peter Sellers as his inspirations for acting and comedy.

== Acting credits ==
=== Film ===
| Year | Title | Role | Notes |
|---|---|---|---|
| 1991 | Curly Sue | Tesio | Credited as "Steven Carell" |
| 1998 | Tomorrow Night | Mailroom Guy without Glasses | |
| 1998 | Homegrown | Party Extra with Funny Pants | Uncredited |
| 2003 | Street of Pain | Mark | Short film |
| 2003 | Bruce Almighty | Evan Baxter | Credited as "Steven Carell" |
| 2004 | Sleepover | Officer Sherman Shiner | |
| 2004 | Anchorman: The Legend of Ron Burgundy | Brick Tamland | |
| 2004 | Wake Up, Ron Burgundy: The Lost Movie | Brick Tamland | Direct-to-DVD |
| 2005 | Melinda and Melinda | Walt Wagner | |
| 2005 | Bewitched | Uncle Arthur | |
| 2005 | The 40-Year-Old Virgin | Andy Stitzer | Also writer and executive producer |
| 2006 | Little Miss Sunshine | Frank Ginsburg | |
| 2006 | American Storage | Rich | Short film |
| 2006 | Over the Hedge | Hammy | Voice |
| 2006 | Hammy's Boomerang Adventure | Hammy | Voice, Short film |
| 2007 | Evan Almighty | Evan Baxter | |
| 2007 | Knocked Up | Himself | Uncredited cameo |
| 2007 | Dan in Real Life | Dan Burns | |
| 2007 | Stories USA | Mark Ronson | Segment: "Street of Pain" |
| 2008 | Horton Hears a Who! | Ned McDodd | Voice |
| 2008 | Get Smart | Maxwell Smart | Also executive producer |
| 2010 | Date Night | Phil Foster | |
| 2010 | Despicable Me | Gru | Voice |
| 2010 | Dinner for Schmucks | Barry Speck | |
| 2011 | Crazy, Stupid, Love | Cal Weaver | Also producer |
| 2012 | Seeking a Friend for the End of the World | Dodge Petersen | |
| 2012 | Hope Springs | Dr. Bernie Feld | |
| 2013 | The Incredible Burt Wonderstone | Burt Wonderstone | Also producer |
| 2013 | Despicable Me 2 | Gru | Voice |
| 2013 | The Way, Way Back | Trent | |
| 2013 | Anchorman 2: The Legend Continues | Brick Tamland | |
| 2014 | Neighbors | TV News | Uncredited cameo |
| 2014 | Alexander and the Terrible, Horrible, No Good, Very Bad Day | Ben Cooper | |
| 2014 | Foxcatcher | John Eleuthère du Pont | |
| 2015 | Minions | Young Gru | Voice cameo |
| 2015 | Freeheld | Steven Goldstein | |
| 2015 | The Big Short | Mark Baum | |
| 2016 | Café Society | Phil | |
| 2017 | Despicable Me 3 | Gru and Dru | Voices |
| 2017 | Battle of the Sexes | Bobby Riggs | |
| 2017 | Last Flag Flying | Larry "Doc" Shepherd | |
| 2018 | Beautiful Boy | David Sheff | |
| 2018 | Vice | Donald Rumsfeld | |
| 2018 | Welcome to Marwen | Mark Hogancamp | |
| 2020 | Irresistible | Gary Zimmer | |
| 2022 | Minions: The Rise of Gru | Gru | Voice |
| 2023 | Asteroid City | Motel Manager | |
| 2024 | IF | Blue | Voice |
| 2024 | Despicable Me 4 | Gru | Voice |
| 2026 | Minions & Monsters | Gru | Voice cameo |

=== Television ===
| Year | Title | Role | Notes |
|---|---|---|---|
| 1996 | The Dana Carvey Show | Various characters | 8 episodes; also writer |
| 1996–2011 | Saturday Night Live | Gary | Voice; 13 episodes |
| 1997 | Over the Top | Yorgo Galfanikos | 12 episodes |
| 1998 | Just Shoot Me! | Mr. Weiland | Episode: "Funny Girl" |
| 1999–2005 | The Daily Show with Jon Stewart | Himself (correspondent) | 277 episodes |
| 2000 | Strangers with Candy | Teacher | Episode: "Behind Blank Eyes" |
| 2002–2003 | Watching Ellie | Edgar | 16 episodes |
| 2004 | Fillmore! | Mr. Delancey | Voice; Episode: "Field Trip of the Just" |
| 2004 | Come to Papa | Blevin | 12 episodes |
| 2005–2011; 2013 | The Office | Michael Scott | 149 episodes Writer ("Casino Night" and "Survivor Man"); Director ("Broke", "Secretary's Day", and "Garage Sale"); Producer (seasons 3–7) |
| 2005; 2008; 2018 | Saturday Night Live | Himself (host) | 3 episodes |
| 2007 | The Naked Trucker and T-Bones Show | Brian | Episode: "T-Bones TV" |
| 2011 | Life's Too Short | Himself | Episode #1.4 |
| 2012 | The Simpsons | Dan Gillick | Voice; Episode: "Penny-Wiseguys" |
| 2013 | Web Therapy | Jackson Pickett | 3 episodes |
| 2013 | Pawn Stars | Himself | Guest |
| 2013 | The Ellen DeGeneres Show | Gru | Guest |
| 2016–2018 | Angie Tribeca | — | 40 episodes Creator and executive producer Writer and director ("Pilot") |
| 2018 | Too Funny to Fail | Himself | Hulu documentary |
| 2019 | The Kelly Clarkson Show | Himself (announcer) | Episode: "Dwayne Johnson" |
| 2019–2021 | The Morning Show | Mitch Kessler | 14 episodes |
| 2020–2022 | Space Force | Mark R. Naird | 17 episodes; also creator, writer, and executive producer |
| 2022 | The Patient | Alan Strauss | Limited series; also executive producer |
| 2025–2026 | The Four Seasons | Nick | 10 episodes |
| 2025 | Mountainhead | Randall Garrett | HBO television film |
| 2026–present | Rooster | Greg Russo | Also executive producer |

=== Theater ===
| Year | Title | Role | Playwright | Venue | Notes | Ref. |
|---|---|---|---|---|---|---|
| 2024 | Uncle Vanya | Vanya | Anton Chekov | Vivian Beaumont Theater | Broadway | |
| 2027 | The Odd Couple | Felix Ungar | Neil Simon | Stephen Sondheim Theatre | Broadway | |

=== Video games ===
| Year | Title | Voice role |
|---|---|---|
| 2002 | Outlaw Golf | Commentator |
| 2003 | Outlaw Volleyball | Commentator |
| 2010 | Despicable Me | Gru |

=== Web series ===
| Year | Title | Role | Notes |
|---|---|---|---|
| 2020 | Some Good News | Entertainment correspondent | Episode 1 |

== Awards and nominations ==
For his contributions to the film industry, Carell received the 2,570th star on the Hollywood Walk of Fame in 2016.
