= Heather Morgan =

American actress and comedian

Heather Morgan is an American actress and comedian. She was a cast member and writer on The Dana Carvey Show, writing and performing such notable skits as Jenny and First Ladies as Dogs, the latter being called "one of the two or three funniest things on the show" by writer and producer Robert Smigel. Morgan wrote, produced and starred in the movie Bark! which was nominated for a Grand Jury Prize at the 2002 Sundance Film Festival. She is an alum of The Groundlings.
