= The Dana Carvey Show =

- Genre: Sketch comedy
- Created by: Dana Carvey; Robert Smigel
- Written by: Louis C.K.; Charlie Kaufman; Jon Glaser; Dino Stamatopoulos; Spike Feresten; Robert Carlock
- Starring: Dana Carvey; Steve Carell; Stephen Colbert; Bill Chott; Elon Gold; Heather Morgan; Peggy Shay; Robert Smigel; James Stephens III
- Country of origin: United States
- Original language: English
- No. of seasons: 1
- No. of episodes: 8 (1 unaired)

Production
- Executive producers: Dana Carvey; Robert Smigel; Bernie Brillstein; Charles Dalaklis; Brad Grey
- Camera setup: Multi-camera
- Running time: 30 minutes (with commercials)
- Production companies: Brillstein-Grey Communications; Columbia Pictures Television

Original release
- Network: ABC
- Release: March 12 – April 30, 1996

The Dana Carvey Show is an American surreal sketch comedy television show that aired on ABC from March 12 to April 30, 1996. Dana Carvey was the host and principal player on the show while Louis C.K. served as head writer.

The show's cast consists heavily of Saturday Night Live and Second City alumni including Carvey, Steve Carell, Stephen Colbert, Bill Chott, Elon Gold, Chris McKinney, Heather Morgan, Peggy Shay, Robert Smigel and James Stephens III. The writing team also included Louis C.K., Charlie Kaufman, Jon Glaser, Dino Stamatopoulos, Spike Feresten and Robert Carlock. In addition, Carvey and Smigel's former Saturday Night Live colleague Greg Daniels contributed material for the premiere episode.

The Dana Carvey Show aired only seven of its planned ten episodes. While the program was short lived and featured controversial material, it has since been considered ahead of its time. The show is also recognized for providing early exposure to Steve Carell and Stephen Colbert and serving as a launchpad for Smigel's series of TV Funhouse cartoons.

== Development ==
"We kind of did reductionist bits where we'd just get away from beginning-middle-end, where the wacky character would walk into a scene and frustrate a straight man for six minutes. Instead, we just said 'And now, here are skinheads from Maine,' and then we just did 10 jokes."

— Robert Smigel

Robert Smigel turned down an offer to rejoin SNL as a producer, favoring the challenge of working with Carvey in prime time. Smigel and Carvey were given SNL's audition tapes which led them to hire Bill Chott and Jon Glaser. They were also joined by Louis C.K. who worked with Smigel on Late Night with Conan O'Brien. Steve Carell was hired through Smigel and Carvey's auditions in which Smigel recalls seeing future SNL alumni Tracy Morgan, Jimmy Fallon and Ana Gasteyer. However, The Dana Carvey Show had a small cast to fill. Smigel himself cast Stephen Colbert, whom he had met years prior, and had tried to use on Late Night. Colbert sent them a homemade audition tape in which he used his newborn daughter as a puppet. He later noted, "I was completely desperate."

The writing staff for The Dana Carvey Show included, Louis C.K. (head writer), Steve Carell, Stephen Colbert, Robert Smigel, Charlie Kaufman, Bob Odenkirk, Robert Carlock, Greg Daniels and Dino Stamatopoulos.

Carvey also saw the new show as an opportunity to move his family away from Los Angeles and raise his two young sons in New York. His family moved to Greenwich, Connecticut, however, causing Carvey to commute several hours to the studio during a brutal winter. He regarded Smigel as the true writer and "creative force" behind the show while Carvey considered himself "kind of a zombie." This was due to his tiring schedule of balancing work and fatherhood which he later considered a mistake.

During the show's development, Smigel and Carvey focused on being different from SNL. The sketches would often be "reductionist bits" in an attempt to feel more "presentational" like Monty Python. This would sometimes frustrate writers whose ideas, while creative, were sometimes rejected because they did not fit the show's approach. Smigel has expressed satisfaction, however, in the outcome of working under such restrictions and believes the show would have found a greater balance had it been given more time on the air. This experimental approach also allowed the show to include short films and cartoons, starting with The Ambiguously Gay Duo. Smigel later considered the cartoons his favorite aspect of the program and noted, "My whole career came out of the impulse to do cartoons on The Dana Carvey Show." In the summer following the show's cancellation, Smigel continued to develop more cartoon ideas which would be used on SNL's TV Funhouse.

Smigel noted that the show had many options in terms of networks. Carvey says that his "first instinct" was to produce the show for HBO, while CBS would have guaranteed several more episodes than the series eventually received. However, the duo was "overly tempted" by the reigning profile of ABC and its prime time offer. The network originally planned on airing ten episodes and did not interfere with the show's creativity, simply wanting a good lead-in to NYPD Blue.

The Dana Carvey Show also attempted to put The Onion on television with Stephen Colbert reporting as an anchor in deadpan style. This material long predated his time on The Daily Show and The Colbert Report. However, the sketches went unaired and have since been subject to rights issues.

== Format ==
The show's humor varied between crude and sophisticated. It debuted on Tuesday, March 12, 1996 at 9:30 ET. On its premiere, following the family-friendly Home Improvement, the notorious first sketch featured Carvey as President Bill Clinton, demonstrating his compassion by having a human baby (which was a doll), several puppies (real ones) and a kitten (also real) suckle milk from his multiple prosthetic nipples. Years later, Carvey claimed that "having that right out of the box sent the wrong message about the show. The show got really panned because of that, and we were in trouble from that point forwards." One infamous ABC promo had the program teased, with that week's full title The Diet Mug Root Beer Dana Carvey Show, after a very special episode of Home Improvement in which Randy Taylor (Jonathan Taylor Thomas) has a health scare.

Carvey also recreated some of the characters he developed on Saturday Night Live, including his signature Church Lady, and parodied the news of the day, as well as the media, politics, commercialism, and other sketch comedy shows. One particularly memorable sketch, "Skinheads From Maine," involved a pair of white power skinheads dressed in plaid, sitting on a porch, whittling, and conversing alternately about their racist beliefs and innocent matters such as the weather in a thick mock Maine accent. ("Nice sunset we're havin'..." "Ayuh, the weather's the only thing the Jews don't control.")

The Dana Carvey Show audience ticket.

Additional post-produced bumper material was often featured between sketches. One such example, Discovery Channel After Dark, featured an edited montage of wild animals mating, and performing other actions that would be considered obscene if shown being done by their human counterparts. This was a parody of adult-based, late-night cable programming.

An animated sketch that first appeared on the show, The Ambiguously Gay Duo, featuring the voices of Stephen Colbert and Steve Carell, became well known on SNL after Carvey's show was canceled. Additionally, a sketch used in the unaired eighth episode about Tom Brokaw prerecording the announcement of Gerald Ford's death was used verbatim when Carvey hosted Saturday Night Live on October 26, 1996.

== History ==
When The Dana Carvey Show first appeared, it was greeted with above average reviews and decent Nielsen ratings. Despite the fact that ABC only aired seven episodes of the series, it has maintained a small but loyal following. The first six episodes that aired were officially titled based on the presenting sponsor of the show:

- "The Taco Bell Dana Carvey Show"
- "The Mug Root Beer Dana Carvey Show"
- "The Mountain Dew Dana Carvey Show"
- "The Diet Mug Root Beer Dana Carvey Show"
- "The Pepsi Stuff Dana Carvey Show"
- "The Szechuan Dynasty Dana Carvey Show"

This was an homage to the classic television shows that Dana Carvey grew up watching in the 1950s and 1960s, wherein a variety show would have a single sponsor whose advertising and promotion were integrated with the show.

The show was videotaped at the CBS Broadcast Center at 524 West 57th Street in New York City. As an inside joke to the fact that an ABC television show was being recorded at a studio owned by a rival network, each show's opening announcement stated, "from the ABC Broadcast Center in New York, it's The ________ Dana Carvey Show!" The blank was where the sponsor's name is heard as a man stands at the top of a ladder outside of the Broadcast Center placing the ABC logo over the CBS Eye logo. Dana would then begin the show surrounded by dancers wearing (for example) gigantic Mug Root Beer soda can costumes.

Each of the first five sponsors were products of PepsiCo, Inc. Shortly after the show's debut, however, PepsiCo announced that its units Taco Bell and Pizza Hut had pulled advertising which would have brought in $600,000 per episode. A spokesperson for the latter told Variety that the company did not "feel comfortable" with the show based upon the premiere episode's content. An ABC spokesperson also told Variety that some sketches in the premiere "went too far." Nevertheless, Pepsi-Cola and sister company Mug Root Beer remained sponsors. The sixth sponsor was a locally popular Manhattan Chinese restaurant, while the final episode had no presenting sponsor. The seven episodes that aired had an average of 16.6 million viewers.

== Episodes ==
No.	Title	Sketches	Cast	Original release date	Viewers (millions)
1	"The Taco Bell Dana Carvey Show"	President Bill Clinton: Mother and Father to the Nation; Show open and monologue; Leftover Beatle Memories; Stupid Pranksters at Drive Thru; Nightline Checks in with the Republican primaries; Drow-Z-Boy Commercial; Nightline Checks Back in with the Republican primaries; Germans Who Say Nice Things; Stupid Pranksters at a Gas Station; An Important Announcement; The Church Lady's Top Ten; Closing and credits	Steve Carell; Bill Chott; Stephen Colbert; Heather Morgan; Robert Smigel; Guest: Larry "Bud" Melman	March 12, 1996	21.1
2	"The Mug Root Beer Dana Carvey Show"	Entertainment Headlines Examines the O. J. Prosecutors; Show open and monologue; Comedy Central's Under Five; Charles Grodin; Hockey Perfectionist; Entertainment Headlines Looks at Filmmaker Oliver Stone; The Ambiguously Gay Duo "It Takes Two to Tango"; Charles Grodin; Leftover Beatle Memories; Celebrity Bloopers and Dark Sides Featuring Paul Hogan and Casey Kasem; Closing and credits	Steve Carell; Bill Chott; Stephen Colbert; Heather Morgan; Robert Smigel; James Stephens III	March 19, 1996	15.2
3	"The Mountain Dew Dana Carvey Show"	Academy Awards sketch; Show open and monologue; Larry King Live Welcomes Ross Perot; The 11 O'Clock News That's Easy to Take; Mountain Dew Looks Like...; Bob Dole's Announcement of a V.P. Running Mate; Susan Sarandon and Gregory Peck present the Foreign Language Academy Award; Grandma the Clown; Closing and credits	Steve Carell; Bill Chott; Stephen Colbert; Heather Morgan; Peggy Shay; Robert Smigel; James Stephens III; Guest: Phil Hartman	March 26, 1996	16.7
4	"The Diet Mug Root Beer Dana Carvey Show"	Show open and monologue; Regis and Kathie Lee; Geraldo with Kato Kaelin, O. J. Simpson; Germans Who Say Nice Things; President Bill Clinton and wife Hillary roasted by Howard Stern; Germans Who Say Nice Things; Closing and credits	Steve Carell; Stephen Colbert; Elon Gold; Chris McKinney; Heather Morgan; Robert Smigel; Guests: Jan Hooks, Carol Channing, Tony Randall, David Letterman	April 2, 1996	19.7
5	"The Pepsi Stuff Dana Carvey Show"	Jay Leno Interviews Quentin Tarantino; Show open and monologue; Crazy Buddies Commercial; Stupid Pranksters Joke at a Movie Theater/Residence; Rich Little's All Rich Little One Man Easter Promo; Waiters Who Are Nauseated by Food; Meanwhile, at Fabio's House; Nixons; Stupid Pranksters Call on a Prostitute; A BBC Report on the Separation of England's Royal Couple; Closing and credits	Steve Carell; Bill Chott; Stephen Colbert; Heather Morgan; Robert Smigel	April 9, 1996	14.5
6	"The Szechuan Dynasty Dana Carvey Show"	World News Tonight: Bob Dole and Bill Clinton Physically Prepare for Their Presidential Race; Show open and monologue; Technofuture; Entertainment Headlines on MTV and the Unabomber; Discovery Channel after Dark; Skinheads from Maine; Entertainment Headlines Looks at Madonny; Skinheads from Maine; Grandma the Clown; The Food Network After Dark; Peter Jennings on the FBI, Pied Piper, and the Montana Freemen's Siege; Jenny Promo; C-SPAN after Dark; Closing and credits	Steve Carell; Bill Chott; Stephen Colbert; Heather Morgan; Peggy Shay; Robert Smigel	April 23, 1996	16.3
7	"The Dana Carvey Show #7"	Newt Gingrich: Washington Pays Its Own Way; Show open and monologue; The Kennedy Memorabilia Auction; The Cutting Room Floor Remembers If I Only Had an Ass; Peter Jennings Gives Anonymous Interviews; Famous First Ladies as Dogs; The Chicago Bulls' Quest for the NBA Championship; Streyhound Bus PSA; World Leaders and Their Baths: Jordan's King Hussein; Closing and credits	Steve Carell; Bill Chott; Stephen Colbert; Heather Morgan; Robert Smigel; Guests: Regis Philbin, Isaac Hayes	April 30, 1996	12.7
8	"The Dana Carvey Show #8"	Charles Grodin; Show open and monologue; Bob Dole Undercover; Germans Who Say Nice Things That Come Out Wrong; Stupid Pranksters Head for the Bowling Alley; David Schwimmer PSA; Tom Brokaw Anticipates the Death of Gerald Ford; Mark Twain Tonight Starring Stomp; Overly Anxious Dinner Conversation; Stupid Pranksters go to a Photo Booth; This Week with David Brinkley; Stupid Pranksters Win the Lottery; The New Rush Limbaugh Show; Closing and credits	Steve Carell; Bill Chott; Stephen Colbert; Elon Gold; Heather Morgan; Robert Smigel; Guests: Abe Vigoda, George Pataki	Unaired	N/A

=== Cancellation and beyond ===
Due to the controversial content and declining ratings, the show was canceled after eight of its ten planned episodes were taped. Smigel and Carvey recalled wanting a parental warning for the show, but were not granted it because of advertiser concerns. However, the duo considered the program less racy by today's standards, stating, "If you take out the teats and a few things, maybe the Mountain Dew, mostly it was clean and silly and abstract." They also regarded Two and a Half Men, a later CBS sitcom, as "much dirtier" than The Dana Carvey Show. "I think that [ABC] wanted a little edgier Carol Burnett Show, and they got something that was a little more than they bargained for," Carvey recalled. The two also believe the show could have been more successful had it been given more time to develop, much like Late Night with Conan O'Brien did. Smigel put it simply, "Bottom line, the network was the wrong fit, wrong timeslot. Cable obviously would have been -- we would have been given credit for what was good instead of attacked for what wasn’t."

Nevertheless, Carvey expressed pride in the program serving as Steve Carell and Stephen Colbert's launchpad and in its creative approach: "We did not compromise anything, literally, in a completely commercialized environment, and did exactly what we wanted - for better or for worse." Colbert has also offered credit to the show's format for developing his satirical onscreen persona, stating, "If you have an opportunity to give it right to the audience, there’s a special connection that you make by looking at the camera."

Upon the program's cancellation, its writers rearranged their office in an askew fashion as a parody of destroying it in anger. They quickly corrected its appearance after angered security guards complained. Carvey returned to stand-up comedy, specifically corporate shows, where he was in high demand and turned down many gigs. His family returned to Los Angeles where he could revolve his schedule around raising his children. Smigel's Ambiguously Gay Duo concept carried on with further installments on Saturday Night Live and led to the creation of several other cartoons. Steve Carell and Stephen Colbert were later cast on Comedy Central's Daily Show where its co-creator, Madeleine Smithberg, was a fan of their "waiters nauseated by food" sketch. The two went on to have significant comedy careers in film and television.

More recently, The Dana Carvey Show has become available via a variety of Internet-related outlets. The series in its entirety (including an eighth episode unaired by ABC) has been available on iTunes, Joost and at no charge on Hulu, Crackle, and YouTube. After Hulu added the show to its lineup of programming in 2008, The Dana Carvey Show was nominated as one of eight finalists for the "Shows we'd bring back" category in the first annual Hulu awards.

In addition, a two-disc DVD set of the show was released in May 2009 by Shout! Factory. The release included deleted sketches, the unaired eighth episode, and commentary extras featuring the show's creators. This release was met with numerous editorial retrospectives of the program.

Dana Carvey would eventually host a program on ABC again 26 years later, when he served as a guest host for the July 18 and 19, 2022 episodes of Jimmy Kimmel Live! as part of Jimmy Kimmel's traditional summer break from the show.

== Critical reception and retrospect ==
Upon its debut, Joyce Millman of Salon called the series a "rousing blast of kamikaze satire" and summed up by declaring, "In his relentless flogging of the advertiser-driven TV biz, Carvey delivered prime time's funniest biting-the-feeding-hand stuff since Michael Moore's short-lived NBC (and briefly, Fox) series TV Nation." Caryn James of The New York Times, however, gave a negative review, claiming, "the debut already looked tired and old" adding, "Right now, the Carvey writers had better be thinking up something edgier than a dancing mug of root beer."

In 2009, New York Times writer Dave Itzkoff lamented, "Comedy fans may remember it as a crucible in which many future stars were forged. But for the people who created the show, it was a stark lesson that when idiosyncratic talents are given the freedom to follow their personal muses, a mass audience does not always follow."

Entertainment Weekly's Alynda Wheat gave the DVD a B− and proclaimed "You can see why Carell and Colbert became famous [...] But just as clear is that Carvey was too wildly hit-or-miss to work." Paste Magazine gave a "respectable" 73 rating and noted that while the show's topicality had not aged well, "when the Dana Carvey Show is on its game it's outstanding, especially towards the end of its short run when it really found its voice." CHUD.com also commended the show's writing and gave an 8/10 rating.

== Streaming ==
The series was most recently available to stream on Crackle; however, this service has shut down as of June, 2025. It was available to stream on Hulu from its launch until its removal around May 2020.

== Documentary ==
In October 2017, streaming service Hulu released a documentary entitled Too Funny to Fail that details the show's rise and fall.
