= Conan Without Borders =

Travel series hosted by Conan O'Brien

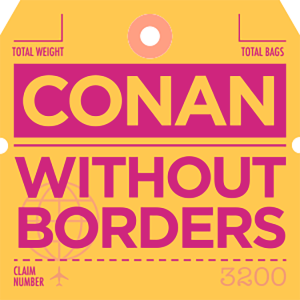
- Genre: Comedy; Travel show
- Created by: Conan O'Brien
- Presented by: Conan O'Brien
- Country of origin: United States
- Original language: English
- No. of episodes: 13

Production
- Executive producers: Conan O'Brien; Jeff Ross
- Producers: Mike Sweeney; Aaron Bleyaert; Ruthie Wyatt
- Running time: 60 minutes
- Production company: Team Coco/Conaco

Original release
- Network: TBS

Related
- Conan; Conan O'Brien Must Go

Conan Without Borders is an American travel show hosted by Conan O'Brien that aired on TBS in the United States as a series of specials on O'Brien's talk show Conan. The series began in February 2015 and included thirteen episodes when the series ceased production due to the onset of the COVID-19 pandemic in the United States and the subsequent ending of Conan. A follow-up series, titled Conan O'Brien Must Go, was released on Max in April 2024.

The episodes do not follow the traditional talk-show format of Conan, instead following O'Brien as he travels outside of the United States and attempts to engage the locals and experience the unique cultural aspects of the area.

== Background ==
O'Brien has a long history of featuring segments that occurred outside the traditional studio environment, dubbed "remotes", ever since his first late-night show, Late Night with Conan O'Brien. They became some of his best-received segments, including a famous remote when O'Brien visited a historic, Civil War-era baseball league. The piece was one of O'Brien's personal favorites, later remarking, "When I leave this earth, at the funeral, just show this, because this pretty much says who I'm all about."

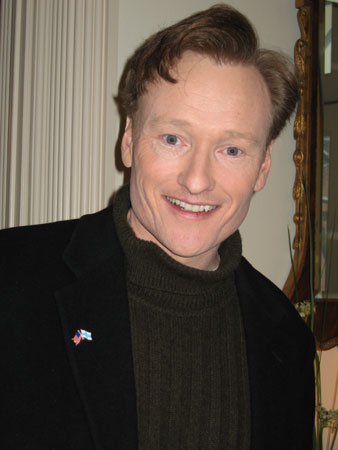
O'Brien at the US Embassy in Helsinki in 2006

The apotheosis of the Late Night remotes centered on the realization, in 2006, that O'Brien bore a striking resemblance to Tarja Halonen, entering her second term as president of Finland. Capitalizing on the resemblance and on the 2006 Finnish presidential election, O'Brien and Late Night aired mock political ads both in support of Halonen and against her main opponent, which influenced popular perception of the race, and traveled to Finland shortly after the election. "We took the show to Helsinki for five days," O'Brien recalled, "where we were embraced like a national treasure." As part of the five-day trip, which was released as a one-hour special episode of Late Night, O'Brien met with Halonen at the Finnish Presidential Palace.

== History ==
O'Brien began hosting the show Conan on TBS in 2010. The first international travel special on the show was in February 2015. Following the onset of the Cuban thaw, O'Brien became the first American television personality to film in Cuba for more than half a century. A few months later, O'Brien visited Armenia in an episode that featured his assistant Sona Movsesian, who is Armenian American. While visiting, Conan guest-starred as a gangster on an Armenian soap opera.

In April 2016, O'Brien visited South Korea in response to a fan letter urging him to visit, as well as a growing fan base online. His visit included a trip to the Korean Demilitarized Zone, which resulted in O'Brien and Steven Yeun also visiting North Korea on a technicality by stepping across the border line at the DMZ. Conan commented on the significance during the sketch, claiming, "The idea that you and I could be in North Korea, talking and communicating freely, seems like kind of a cool message." These and subsequent hour-long international travel specials were branded Conan Without Borders and became part of their own series. Conan eventually travelled to thirteen countries in total.

In April 2017, O'Brien visited Mexico for "Conan Without Borders: Made in Mexico". The episode featured some of the traditional features of his talk show, including an opening monologue, which he delivered in Spanish, and had an entirely Mexican staff, crew, audience, and guests.

The series' final episode before the onset of travel restrictions due to the COVID-19 pandemic aired in September 2019, and Conan ended in June 2021. O'Brien traveled to thirteen countries in total. In August 2021, O'Brien stated he was interested in continuing Conan Without Borders in some capacity after the COVID-19 pandemic, with TBS stating in 2020 that the specials would continue to air on their channel.

The international shows became available on Netflix before moving to HBO Max.

On May 17, 2023, it was announced that a four-episode international travel series titled Conan O'Brien Must Go was in production, to be released on Max. The series features O'Brien meeting various fans in person whom he had previously featured via video calls in his podcast series Conan O'Brien Needs a Fan.

== Reception ==
The series became some of O'Brien's most popular work, winning an Emmy in 2018 and being nominated in 2019. The first episode in the series, "Conan in Cuba", was watched by around 1.81 million people according to Nielsen ratings, up from Conan's typical average of 642,000.

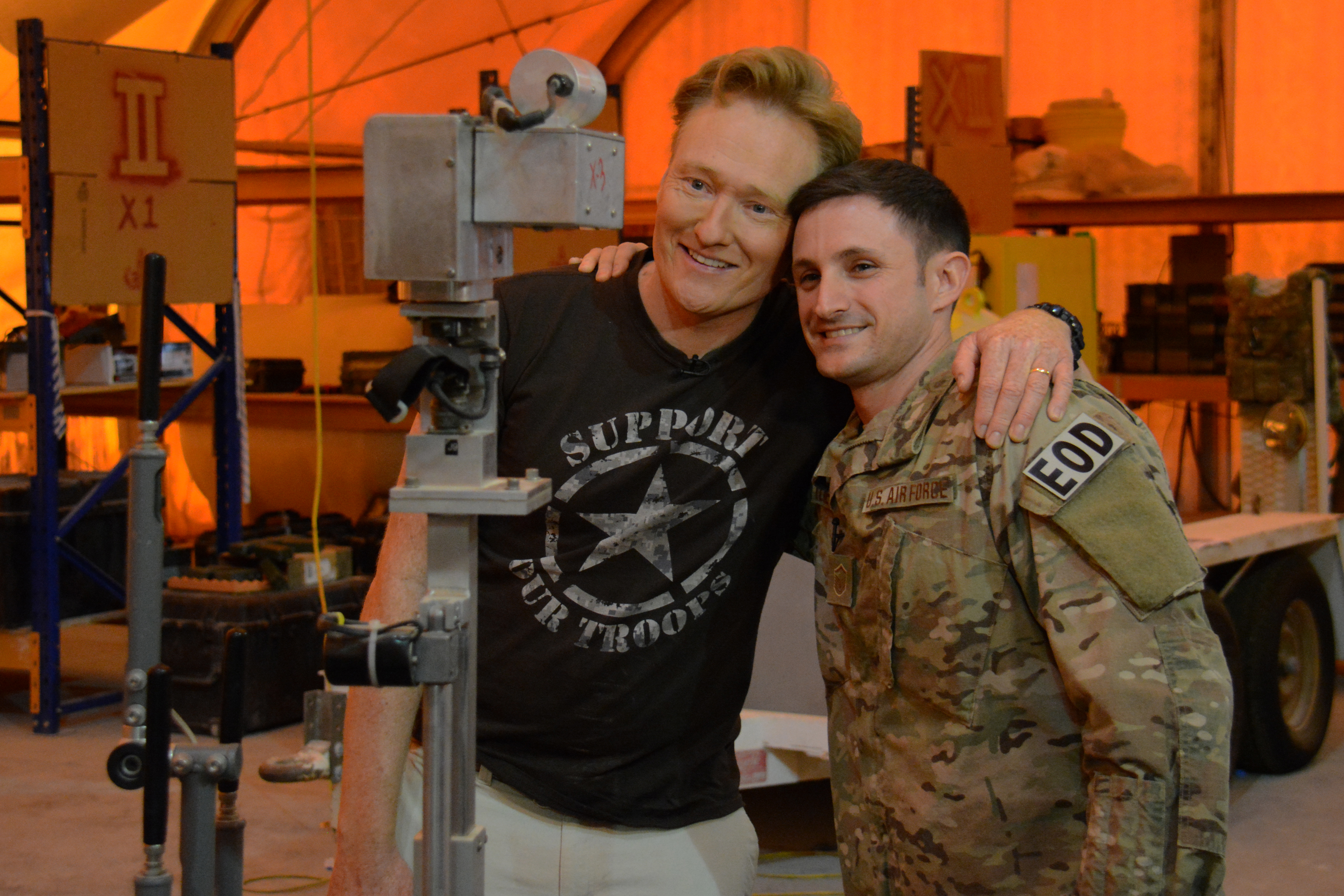
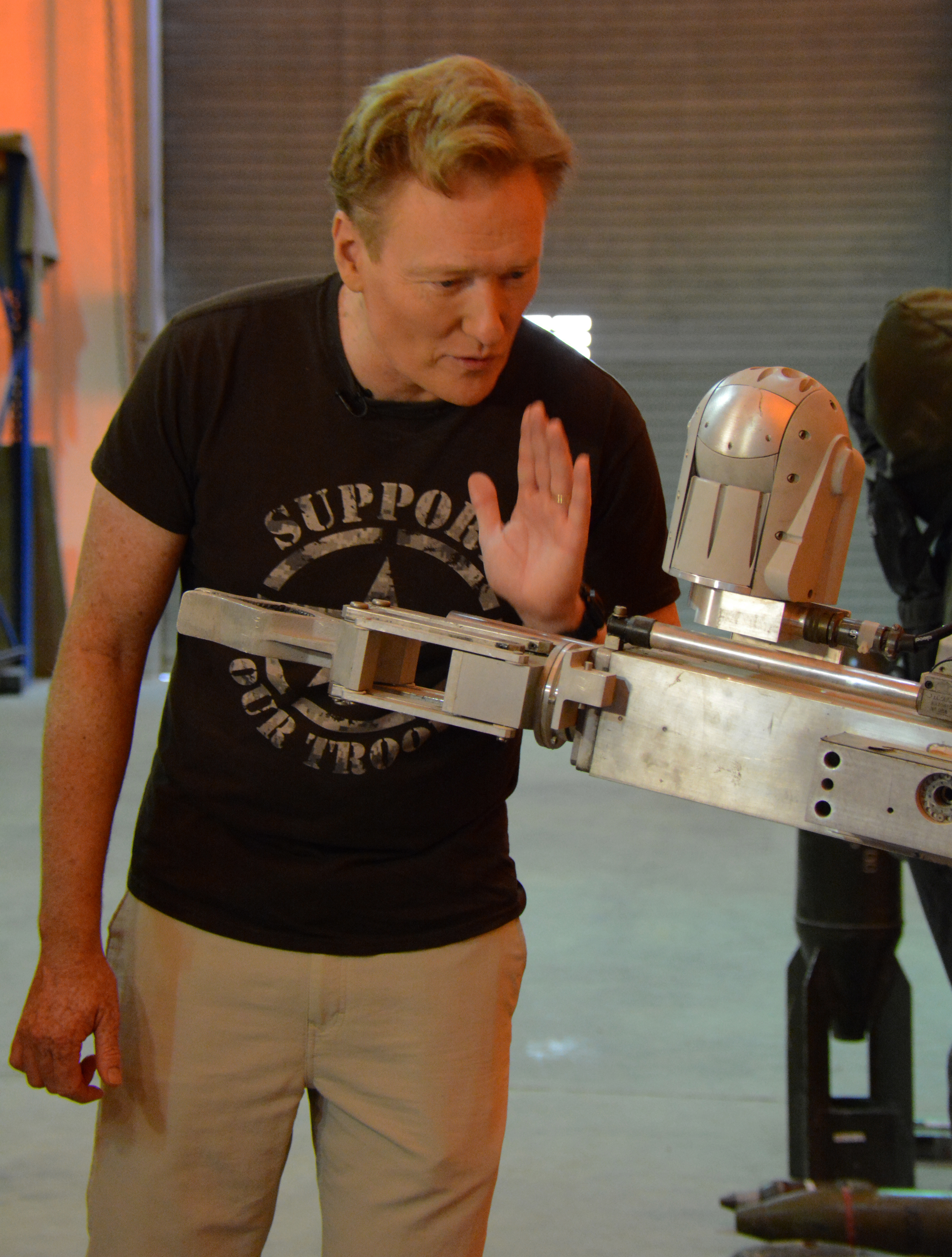
O'Brien at Al Udeid Air Base during "Conan in Qatar"

In a 2017 review by Daniel Fienberg for The Hollywood Reporter, he stated "Conan’s global adventures have become his TBS show's greatest piece of differentiation from the dozen other shows in the late night and talk show space."

O'Brien himself reflected in an interview with Stephen Colbert in 2017 that the show helped him fulfill his "greatest joy" in "trying to make people laugh that don't even speak English, don't know who I am. [...] It's a little bit of sort of diplomacy through comedy. I like to show that Americans are curious, we're humbled. We're okay to look ridiculous. It's okay if you laugh at us."

== Episodes ==
No.	Title	Guest(s)	Destination	Original release date
1	"Conan in Cuba"	N/A	Cuba	March 14, 2015
With relations between the United States and Cuba improving, O'Brien and a film crew went to Havana for four days around the weekend of February 14–15 to tape segments for an episode. Conan visited a cigar factory and learned the rumba. The episode marks the first time an American late-night talk show has filmed in Cuba since Jack Paar interviewed Fidel Castro on The Tonight Show in 1959.
2	"Conan in Armenia"	Sona Movsesian	Armenia	November 17, 2015
The episode centered around taking his long-time assistant Sona Movsesian back to her ancestral homeland of Armenia to connect with her heritage.
3	"Conan in Qatar"	Michelle Obama	Qatar	January 25, 2016
Conan traveled to the Al Udeid Air Base in Qatar with First Lady Michelle Obama. The episode's alternative title was Mission Conan.
4	"Conan Does Korea"	Steven Yeun	South Korea; North Korea	April 9, 2016
Conan traveled to South Korea along with Steven Yeun; the visit also included a trip to the Korean DMZ, technically resulting in an additional trip by crossing the border into North Korea.
5	"Conan in Berlin"	Flula Borg	Germany	December 7, 2016
Conan traveled to Berlin, Germany along with Bavarian comedian Flula Borg.
6	"Conan Without Borders: Made in Mexico"	Diego Luna, Vicente Fox, and Sofia Niño De Rivera	Mexico	March 1, 2017
The visit was made in response to the actions and effort made by President Donald Trump to build a wall across the southern border. Guests included Diego Luna and Vicente Fox, and stand-up performance from Sofia Niño De Rivera.
7	"Conan Without Borders: Israel"	Lior Raz and Gal Gadot	Israel; Palestine	September 19, 2017
The visit was made in response to Trump associate Jared Kushner's attempts to further the Israeli-Palestinian peace process. Within the same episode, he also crossed the Wall and visited Palestine, where he talked to pro-Palestinian activists.
8	"Conan Without Borders: Haiti"	N/A	Haiti	January 27, 2018
Conan visited the island nation in response to President Donald Trump's alleged description of the country and parts of Africa as "shithole countries".
9	"Conan in Italy"	Jordan Schlansky	Italy	April 11, 2018
Conan and producer Jordan Schlansky visit Italy, with Conan hoping to expose Schlansky as a fraud.
10	"Conan in Japan"	N/A	Japan	November 28, 2018
After finding out that the Japanese town of Hokuei, Tottori is also well known as "Conan-Town" (named for the popular anime/manga character Conan Edogawa, whose creator, Gosho Aoyama, is a Hokuei native), Conan makes a visit to the country.
11	"Conan Without Borders: Australia"	Steen Raskopoulos, Becky Lucas and Rhys Nicholson	Australia	April 17, 2019
Conan traveled to Australia in response to a video sent by Hugh Jackman in which he points out that Conan had not gone to his country yet.
12	"Conan Without Borders: Greenland"	N/A	Greenland	September 3, 2019
When President Donald Trump announced his plans to buy Greenland, Conan decided to travel to the country to secure the purchase.
13	"Conan Without Borders: Ghana"	Sam Richardson	Ghana	November 7, 2019
Along with Sam Richardson, O'Brien visited following an invitation from the U.S. Ghanaian Embassy to visit the country during "The Year of Return", an initiative to bring awareness to African-American heritage, marked by the 400th anniversary of the African slave trade.
