= Conan O'Brien Must Go =

Travel show hosted by Conan O'Brien

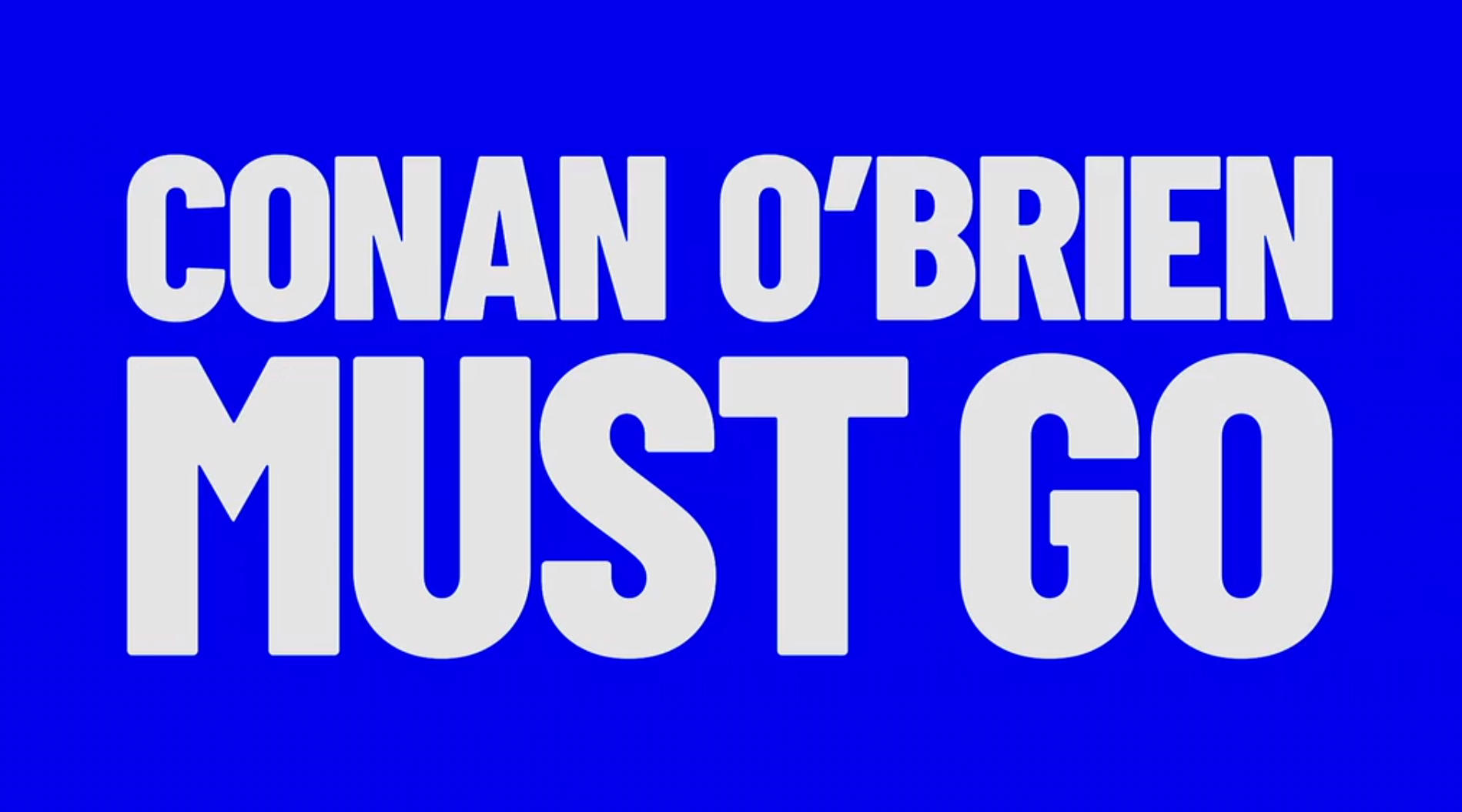
- Genre: Comedy; Travel show
- Created by: Conan O'Brien
- Written by: Conan O'Brien; Matt O'Brien; Jessie Gaskell; Mike Sweeney
- Directed by: Mike Sweeney
- Presented by: Conan O'Brien
- Narrated by: Werner Herzog
- Original language: English
- No. of seasons: 3
- No. of episodes: 11

Production
- Executive producers: Conan O'Brien; Jeff Ross
- Producers: Jason Chillemi; Sarah Federowicz; Aaron Bleyaert; Jordan Schlansky
- Production company: Conaco

Original release
- Network: Max
- Release: April 18, 2024
- Network: HBO Max
- Release: May 8 – May 22, 2025
- Network: HBO
- Release: August 21, 2026 – present

Related
- Conan; Conan Without Borders; Conan O'Brien Needs a Friend

Conan O'Brien Must Go is a comedic travel show starring former late-night talk show host Conan O'Brien. The series serves as a spin-off of his podcast Conan O'Brien Needs a Friend, and is a successor to his many remote segments and the Conan Without Borders travel specials that originally aired as part of his TBS show Conan. It features O'Brien meeting various fans in person whom he had previously featured via video calls in his podcast series.

The series premiered on Max on April 18, 2024. In the first season, O'Brien traveled to Norway, Argentina, Thailand, and Ireland. In May 2024, the series was renewed for a second season that premiered on May 8, 2025, on HBO Max. In the second season, O'Brien traveled to Spain, New Zealand, and Austria. In March 2025, the series was renewed for a third season that premiered on August 21, 2026, on HBO. The series has received widespread critical acclaim and has received two Emmy Awards.

== Background ==
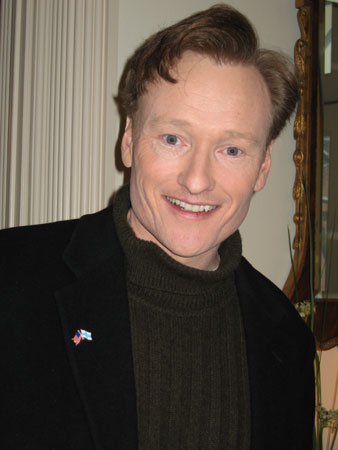
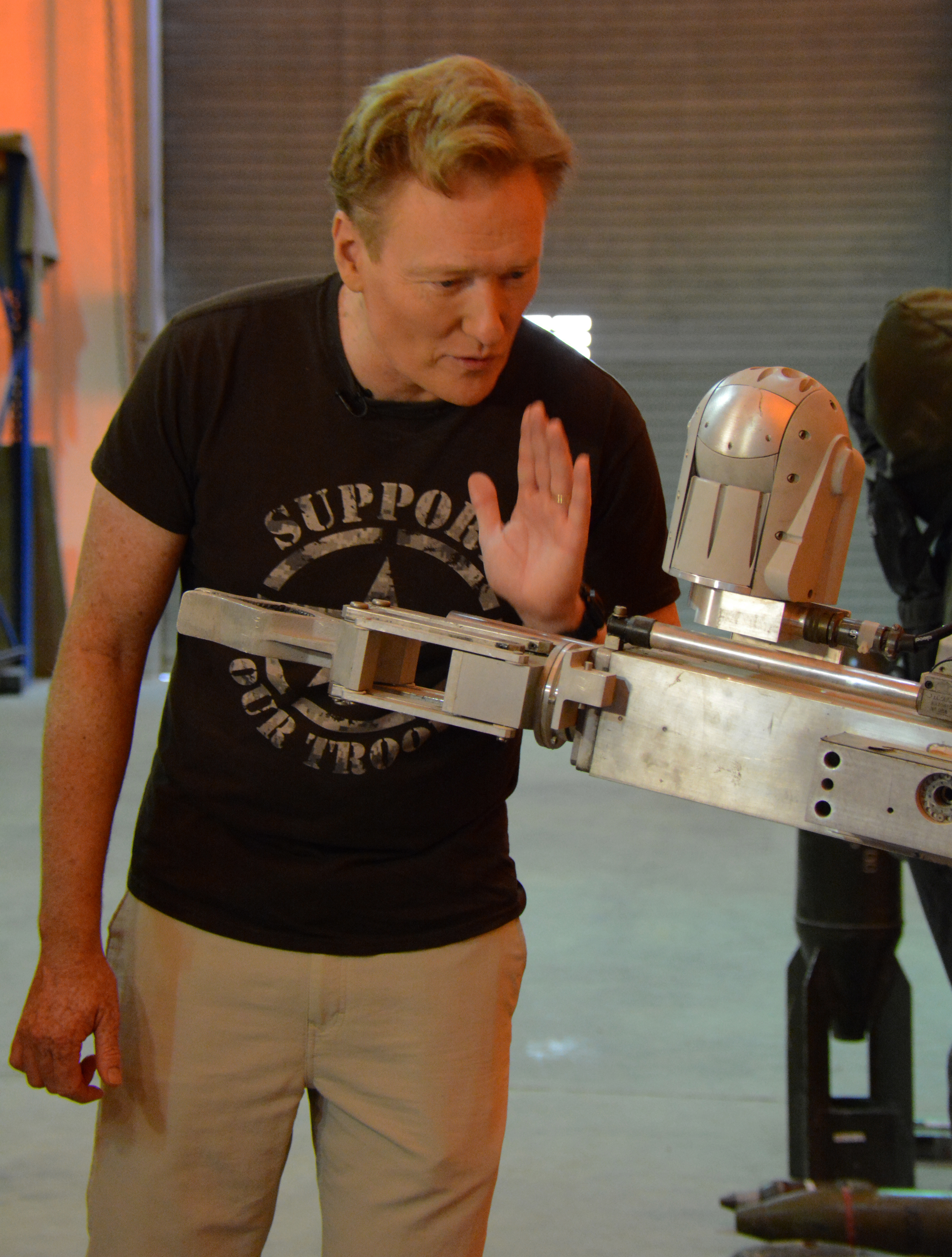
(Left) O'Brien at the US Embassy in Helsinki in 2006 and (Right) at Al Udeid Air Base during an episode of Conan Without Borders in 2016

O'Brien has a long history of featuring segments that occurred outside the traditional studio environment, dubbed "remotes", ever since his first late-night show, Late Night with Conan O'Brien. They became some of his best-received segments, including a famous remote when O'Brien visited a historic, Civil War–era baseball league. The piece was one of O'Brien's personal favorites, later remarking, "When I leave this earth, at the funeral, just show this, because this pretty much says who I'm all about."

The apotheosis of the Late Night remotes centered on the realization, in 2006, that O'Brien bore a striking resemblance to Tarja Halonen, entering her second term as president of Finland. Capitalizing on the resemblance and on the 2006 Finnish presidential election, O'Brien and Late Night aired mock political ads both in support of Halonen and against her main opponent, which influenced popular perception of the race, and traveled to Finland shortly after the election. "We took the show to Helsinki for five days," O'Brien recalled, "where we were embraced like a national treasure." As part of the five-day trip, which was released as a one-hour special episode of Late Night, O'Brien met with Halonen at the Finnish Presidential Palace.

O'Brien began hosting the show Conan on TBS in 2010. The first international travel special on the show was in February 2015. Following the onset of the Cuban thaw, O'Brien became the first American television personality to film in Cuba for more than half a century. A few months later, O'Brien visited Armenia in an episode that featured his assistant Sona Movsesian, who is Armenian American. Thirteen specials in total aired before the ending of Conan in 2021. The travel series, collectively referred to as Conan Without Borders, became some of O'Brien's most popular work, winning an Emmy in 2018 and being nominated in 2019.

Conan O'Brien Needs a Friend premiered November 18, 2018, when O'Brien's talk show was on hiatus and being retooled from an hour-long format into a half-hour format. The title refers to the podcast's premise that O'Brien is only friends with people who work for him, and the friendly conversations he has with celebrities on his talk show rarely translate to lasting friendships, an issue he is looking to fix. In April 2021, O'Brien launched a subseries on the podcast titled Conan O'Brien Needs a Fan, in which he and cohosts Movsesian and Matt Gourley take questions from fans via video calling.

== Production ==
In November 2020, it was announced O'Brien would host a weekly variety series for what was then known as HBO Max. O'Brien stated in a 2024 interview that this announcement was a miscommunication, and that he never intended to produce a weekly show or variety show. Conan O'Brien Must Go was announced in May 2023. The show began filming in Norway in March and Thailand in April before production was halted by the 2023 Writers Guild of America strike, which lasted from May to September 2023.

The show is produced by Jason Chillemi, Sarah Federowicz, Aaron Bleyaert, and Jordan Schlansky. It is written and produced by Conan O'Brien, Matt O'Brien, Jessie Gaskell, and Mike Sweeney and executive produced by Conan O'Brien and Jeff Ross through O'Brien's company Conaco. The opening of each episode includes an introduction voiced by Werner Herzog.

== Episodes ==
Series overview
Season	Episodes	Originally released		
Season	Episodes	First released	Last released	Network
1	4	April 18, 2024		Max
2	3	May 8, 2025	May 22, 2025	HBO Max
3	4	August 21, 2026	September 11, 2026	HBO

=== Season 1 (2024) ===
No. overall	No. in season	Title	Directed by	Written by	Original release date
1	1	"Norway"	Mike Sweeney	Jessie Gaskell, Conan O'Brien, Matt O'Brien, and Mike Sweeney	April 18, 2024
Conan travels to Bergen, Norway where he visits his fan Jarle, a Norwegian rapper, and criticizes his unrefined bachelor lifestyle and apartment. Conan addresses his missing luggage by purchasing traditional Norwegian clothing, interacts with locals, and attends a knitting circle. Conan then travels to Gudvangen to learn about and dress like the Vikings. He then records a song with Jarle's rap duo E.D.A, learns about sex culture in Norway from a sex therapist, and travels to Lofoten to visit another fan named Kai who is a salmon farmer. In Oslo, he attempts to get his and E.D.A's song played on a radio station and performs it with them at a music venue.
2	2	"Argentina"	Mike Sweeney	Jessie Gaskell, Conan O'Brien, Matt O'Brien, and Mike Sweeney	April 18, 2024
Conan travels to Buenos Aires, Argentina to visit his fan Sebastian, an artist whom he commissions to create a mural. After learning about Argentine culture from a translator and tour guide, he drinks wine and eats asado while antagonizing his longtime producer and comedic foil Jordan Schlansky. He then visits another fan named Matías and joins him on his radio show. He takes tango lessons. He then introduces a fan named Cammy to a Larry David impersonator. He trains with association football team San Lorenzo de Almagro and sings with gauchos in the Pampas. Conan visits the completed mural he commissioned, which features him with Lionel Messi and Pope Francis and is titled Hijos Sagrados de Argentina (Sacred Sons of Argentina).
3	3	"Thailand"	Mike Sweeney	Jessie Gaskell, Conan O'Brien, Matt O'Brien, and Mike Sweeney	April 18, 2024
Conan travels to Bangkok, Thailand where he visits his fan Anna and her mother. He performs at a Thai television show where he attempts to sing a song in Thai. He then visits the Damnoen Saduak Floating Market before visiting a tailor where he purchases formal Thai costume. He visits Wat Arun, Wat Pho and Chinatown, Bangkok where he samples Thai street food. He visits another fan named Whitney who is a rock climber. He then visits an animation studio and a Muay Thai boxing gym.
4	4	"Ireland"	Mike Sweeney	Jessie Gaskell, Conan O'Brien, Matt O'Brien, and Mike Sweeney	April 18, 2024
Conan visits Ireland to trace his family's roots. He visits the Barack Obama Plaza in County Tipperary where he unveils the "Conan O'Brien Air Pump". He then visits Dublin where he learns Irish slang. He searches for Bono, luring him in with a humanitarian award. He then visits a fan named Mohammed, a Pakistani immigrant, and his siblings. He then travels to Galway to appear on the Irish-language soap opera Ros na Rún and sings with The Irish Tenors. He then meets a genealogist who describes his family's history as agricultural workers. He samples blood sausage at a butcher before traveling to Wicklow. He visits the Wicklow Head lighthouses and its keeper before "going mad" in a parody of The Lighthouse. He visits Galbally and the farmstead where his great-grandfather lived.

=== Season 2 (2025) ===
No. overall	No. in season	Title	Directed by	Written by	Original release date
5	1	"Spain"	Mike Sweeney	José Arroyo, Jessie Gaskell, Conan O'Brien, and Mike Sweeney	May 8, 2025
Conan travels to Spain where he visits Javier Bardem.
6	2	"New Zealand"	Mike Sweeney	José Arroyo, Jessie Gaskell, Conan O'Brien, and Mike Sweeney	May 15, 2025
Conan travels to New Zealand where he visits Taika Waititi, Maaka Pohatu, and Abby Howells.
7	3	"Austria"	Mike Sweeney	José Arroyo, Jessie Gaskell, Conan O'Brien, and Mike Sweeney	May 22, 2025
Conan travels to Austria.

=== Season 3 (2026) ===
No. overall	No. in season	Title	Directed by	Written by	Original release date
8	1	"India"	Mike Sweeney	José Arroyo, Jessie Gaskell, Conan O'Brien, and Mike Sweeney	August 21, 2026
9	2	"The Netherlands"	Mike Sweeney	José Arroyo, Jessie Gaskell, Conan O'Brien, and Mike Sweeney	August 28, 2026
10	3	"Morocco"	Mike Sweeney	José Arroyo, Jessie Gaskell, Conan O'Brien, and Mike Sweeney	September 4, 2026
11	4	"The Philippines"	Mike Sweeney	José Arroyo, Jessie Gaskell, Conan O'Brien, and Mike Sweeney	September 11, 2026

== Release ==
The series premiered on Max in the United States on April 18, 2024, and consists of four episodes. O'Brien traveled to Norway, Thailand, Argentina, and Ireland for the first season.

On May 15, 2024, the series was renewed for a second season, which consists of three episodes and premiered on May 8, 2025, on HBO Max. O'Brien traveled to New Zealand, Austria, and Spain for the second season.

On March 10, 2025, the series was renewed for a third season, which consists of four episodes and premiered on August 21, 2026, on HBO. O'Brien traveled to India, the Netherlands, Morocco, and the Philippines for the third season.

== Reception ==
The first season received widespread critical acclaim. On the review aggregator website Rotten Tomatoes, Conan O'Brien Must Go has an approval rating of 94% based on 18 reviews, with an average rating of 8.7/10. The website's consensus reads: "Less an informative travelogue than a pretense for Conan O'Brien to mug in exotic locales, Must Go is a must watch for fans of the comedian's antic shenanigans." Metacritic, which uses a weighted average, assigned a score of 77 out of 100 based on 6 critics, indicating "generally favorable" reviews. Tania Hussain writing for Collider described the show as "what might be the year's most inventive and wildly hilarious series," and that it was "a shame there are only four episodes." Stephen Rodrick writing for Variety gave the show a positive review. In another positive review, Eric Deggans writing for NPR called the show a "funhouse mirror version of a travel show", with Jen Chaney writing for Vulture similarly noting the series "is much more blatant about its interest in riffing on and subverting the tropes of the travel format" than the Conan Without Borders series. In an otherwise positive review from The A.V. Club, Meredith Hobbs Coons noted that, "the vibes can be a bit off at times, and certain scenes seem to drag, as if he's willing with all his might to draw comedy from them", with Variety similarly mentioning that, "some of the stuff goes on a bit long".

Many reviewers praised O'Brien's self-deprecating approach to comedy, noting that the choice helped avoid any cultural insensitivity. The episode in Ireland in which O'Brien explores his heritage was especially praised for its profundity and heartwarming qualities. At the 76th Primetime Creative Arts Emmy Awards, the show won in Outstanding Writing for a Nonfiction Program for the episode "Ireland" and was nominated in Outstanding Hosted Nonfiction Series or Special. At the 77th Primetime Creative Arts Emmy Awards, the show was nominated in the same categories. The episode "Austria" was nominated for "Outstanding Writing For A Nonfiction Program" and the series won in the category "Outstanding Hosted Nonfiction Series Or Special".
