= Conan O'Brien Needs a Friend =

American comedy podcast

- Genre: Comedy; interview; improv
- Language: English

Cast and voices
- Hosted by: Conan O'Brien; Sona Movsesian; Matt Gourley

Music
- Theme music composed by: The White Stripes
- Opening theme: "We're Going to Be Friends"

Production
- Production: Team Coco; Earwolf
- Length: 32–91 minutes

Publication
- No. of episodes: 379 main episodes 220 fan episodes 24 specials 20 bonus episodes
- Original release: November 19, 2018 – present
- Provider: Team Coco & Earwolf

Related
- Website: teamcoco.com/podcasts/conan-obrien-needs-a-friend

Conan O'Brien Needs a Friend is a weekly podcast hosted by American comedian, retired talk show host, and former Saturday Night Live and Simpsons writer Conan O'Brien. It is co-hosted by O'Brien's executive assistant, Sona Movsesian, and producer, Matt Gourley. The podcast debuted in November 2018 and features O'Brien talking with comedians, actors, and other notable figures including Jeff Goldblum, Adam Sandler, Stephen Colbert, David Letterman, Bill Burr, Tom Hanks, and Tina Fey, along with personal friends, such as Lisa Kudrow, Joel McHale, Timothy Olyphant, and Kevin Nealon, people he admires such as Carol Burnett, Neil Young, Paul McCartney, John Cleese, and Robert Caro, and political figures, such as Presidents Joe Biden and Barack Obama.

Conan O'Brien Needs a Friend has received positive reviews from critics and is one of the top comedy podcasts on iTunes.

In April 2024, the international travel series titled Conan O'Brien Must Go was released on Max. The series features O'Brien meeting various fans in person whom he had previously featured via video calls in Conan O'Brien Needs a Fan, a popular sub-series of the podcast.

== History ==
Conan O'Brien Needs a Friend premiered November 18, 2018, when O'Brien's talk show was on hiatus and being retooled from an hour-long format into a half-hour format. O'Brien announced, "After 25 years of extensive market research, we have learned that people want to hear my voice without seeing my face. So rejoice, America." Despite this, Team Coco has always taped the interviews. Until May 12, 2025, however, only short clips were released. Starting May 12, 2025, the full episodes were made available on YouTube.

The title refers to the podcast's premise that O'Brien is only friends with people who work for him, and the friendly conversations he has with celebrities on his talk show rarely translate to lasting friendships, an issue he is looking to fix.

The first 36 episodes of the podcast were packaged together as one season. A second season consisting of another 36 episodes premiered on October 7, 2019, after a run of six special episodes titled Deep Dive with Dana Carvey. The podcast abandoned the season format when it resumed on August 3, 2020.

In April 2021, O'Brien launched a sub-series titled Conan O'Brien Needs a Fan, in which he, Movsesian, and Gourley will take questions from fans all around the world via Zoom. In July 2021, it was announced that O'Brien's assistant David Hopping would replace Movsesian during her maternity leave. Movsesian returned on the episode released October 10, 2021, the same podcast where Gourley announced he would be taking a month-long paternity leave. In November 2021, O'Brien, Movsesian, and Gourley performed a live version of the podcast at the Wiltern Theater in Los Angeles.

In May 2022, the podcast, as well as the entire digital media business Team Coco, was sold to SiriusXM for $150 million. The show was announced to continue to be distributed everywhere it had previously been available.

On May 17, 2023, it was announced that the international travel series titled Conan O'Brien Must Go was in production for Max. The series features O'Brien meeting various fans in person whom he had previously featured via video calls in the Conan O'Brien Needs a Fan sub-series. On December 15, 2023, O'Brien recorded an episode with US President Joe Biden at the White House.

== Format ==
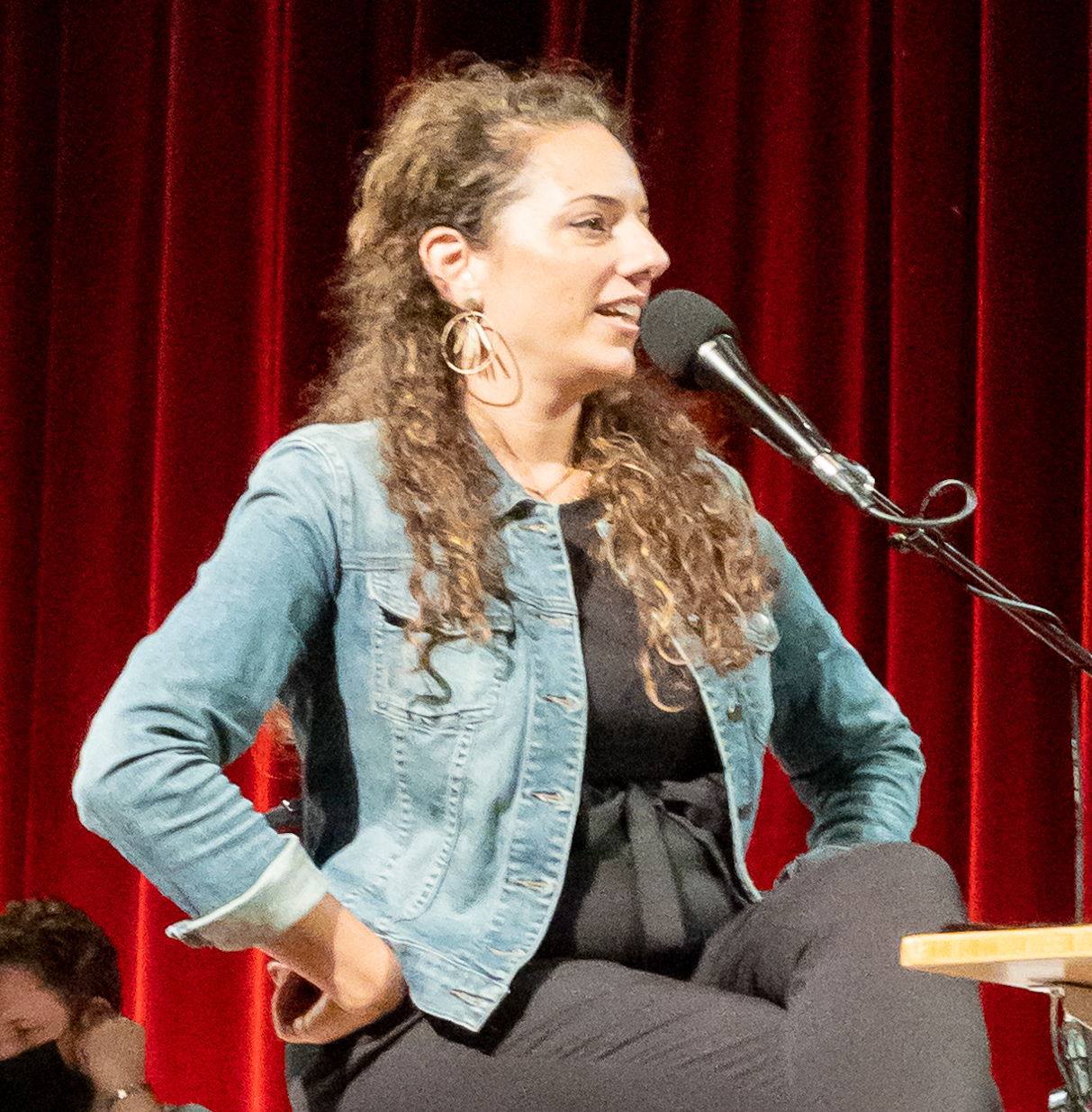
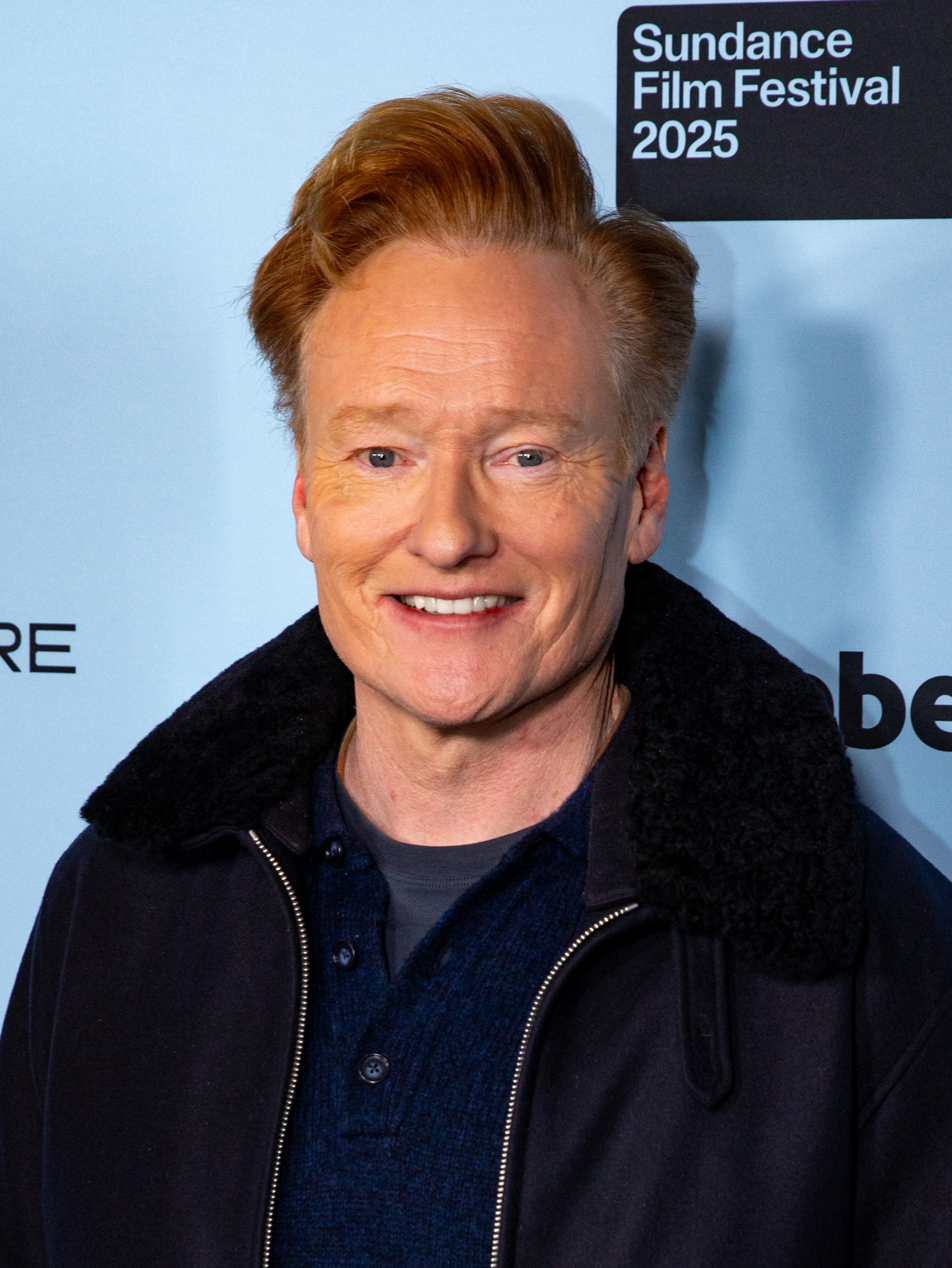
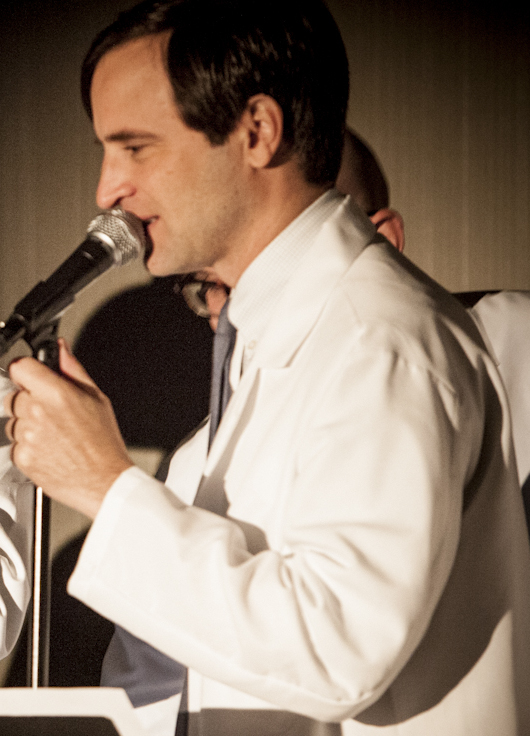
From left to right, Sona Movsesian, Conan O'Brien, and Matt Gourley host the podcast.

=== Main episodes ===
The core series of the podcast opens with the guests stating their names and saying, "I feel _____ about being Conan O'Brien's friend" in which they state their feelings about their respective friendships with Conan, intercut with guitar music by Jimmy Vivino. This is followed by the show's theme music, "We're Going to Be Friends" by The White Stripes. The majority of the podcast is then a casual interview between O'Brien and the guest.

Sona Movsesian, O'Brien's long-time personal assistant, and Matt Gourley, the podcast's producer, serve as sidekicks. Many of the episodes feature O'Brien periodically reading ads, sometimes introduced as a segment called "Conan O'Brien Pays Off the Mortgage on His Beach House". To close out the podcast, conversations largely unrelated to the preceding interview are featured, with O'Brien, Movsesian, and Gourley discussing topics including minor workplace squabbles, the success of the podcast, O'Brien's idiosyncrasies, or listeners' messages.

=== Conan O'Brien Needs a Fan ===
The subseries Conan O'Brien Needs a Fan involves O'Brien interviewing fans. The series became part of the premise behind the travel show Conan O'Brien Must Go, in which he visited several of the fans he had talked to on the podcast.

=== Specials ===
In July 2019, after the success of Dana Carvey's earlier appearance on the main podcast, O'Brien and Carvey hosted Deep Dive with Dana. The miniseries was composed of six episodes.

In May 2023, a four-part series titled The Lost Hans and Franz Movie was released, based on the characters Hans and Franz as portrayed by Dana Carvey and Kevin Nealon. Starting in the early 1990s, a Hans and Franz film was in development, with the working title Hans and Franz Go to Hollywood, with Arnold Schwarzenegger slated to star and produce. In a 2010 interview on Conan, Nealon and host O'Brien discussed being holed up in a Santa Monica hotel room for a month with Carvey and Robert Smigel working on the script for what was then intended to be a musical. Carvey discussed the script under the title Hans and Franz: The Girlyman Dilemma during a 2016 interview with Howard Stern. According to Stern, the movie fell apart because Schwarzenegger withdrew, and that he was rumored to do so because of the poor reception of his self-parodying vehicle Last Action Hero. Scenes from the script were acted out on the podcast, with Carvey, Nealon, and Smigel voicing the various roles.

Occasionally, live showings have been held at the Beacon Theater and SiriusXM Garage with special guests. This has included Stephen Colbert, Tracy Morgan and Ed Sheeran, among others. Before interviewing, Conan would interact with fans and hold a live Q&A.

== Reception ==
=== Critical reception ===
Conan O'Brien Needs a Friend has received strong reviews. Writing for Rolling Stone, Matt Saincome listed it among the best new podcasts of 2018: "Instead of the heavily choreographed late-night talk show conversations, listeners are treated to a much more vulnerable, behind-the-scenes vibe from O'Brien. The dynamic between him and his assistant Sona Movsesian helps with this. The relationship is endearing and serves as a springboard for the listener to get to know Conan better, by hearing how those around him see him." Saincome listed the podcasts with Kristen Bell and Dax Shepard as highlights among the first few episodes, writing, "All episodes of this podcast are worth a listen so far, but the one-two punch of Kristen Bell and Dax Shepard stood out for the genuine warmth and discussion of Conan's personal life."

In his review for Vulture, Nicholas Quah praised O'Brien as a stellar podcast host in a very crowded field, writing, "His weirdness translates well to the casual intimacy that's come to define the podcast as a platform for performance, and his default stance of efficient self-deprecation makes the show feel accessible in ways that other comedy podcasts, fronted by needier ids, may not." Quah also praised the dynamic among O'Brien and his sidekicks on the show, Sona Movsesian and Matt Gourley: "It also helps that O'Brien is great at the performance of longer-form interviews, effectively balancing the impulse of filling the room with being genuinely curious, and there's also a lot of charm to be found in the podcast, particularly in the core O'Brien-Movsesian-Gourley workplace dynamic, which goes a long way to providing listeners with a sheen of habitual comfort."

In an article for The Boston Globe, Joshua Macht noted that O'Brien establishing a weekly podcast confirmed that podcasting is no longer on the fringes of the digital audio market. Macht writes, "The arrival of heavy hitters such as Conan O'Brien may not signal the end of podcasting—or even the peak—but it will usher in a new phase for the medium."

In a review for BBC Radio 4's Podcast Radio Hour, Jake Yapp celebrated the "sincerity and openness" of the show, despite its strong humor content. Yapp also praised the parity between guest and host, despite the many outstanding comedians on the podcast, and noted that there was a sincere lack of one-upmanship common among comedians.

According to Irish writer Mark Farrelly, who called the podcast an "auditory delight", the podcast has been developing a "cult following" in Europe. Farrelly also praised the unexpected humor in the "Conan O'Brien Pays Off the Mortgage on His Beach House" segments, with O'Brien "showing his genius by turning live reads into top notch comedy material."

O'Brien's success as a podcast host was the cover story of the August 20, 2019, issue of Variety magazine, in which he was dubbed "the darling of the podcasting world". That day, Marc Maron appeared on Conan with the issue, jokingly taking offense that O'Brien had been dubbed a pioneer of the medium after approximately 30 episodes, whereas Maron had done more than 1,000 at that point.

The show won the 2021 Ambies Award for "Best Comedy Podcast".

=== Downloads ===
Matt Gourley stated in the May 12, 2019, episode featuring Bill Hader, that each episode receives one million downloads in its first cycle, shortly after release, which Variety referred to as "blockbuster numbers for a podcast". In August 2021, Deadline Hollywood reported the podcast had reached over 250 million downloads and averaged more than nine million downloads per month. In March 2024, Variety reported that the podcast had reached 427 million downloads.

== Episodes ==
=== Series overview ===
Season	Episodes	Originally released	
Season	Episodes	First released	Last released
1	36	November 18, 2018	July 22, 2019
Deep Dive with Dana Carvey	6	August 4, 2019	September 8, 2019
2	36	October 7, 2019	June 8, 2020
Summer S'mores S1	7	June 15, 2020	July 27, 2020
Needs a Friend	297	August 3, 2020	Ongoing
Needs a Fan	220	April 15, 2021	Ongoing
Summer S'mores S2	6	June 9, 2022	July 14, 2022
The Lost Hans and Franz Movie	4	May 17, 2023	June 7, 2023
Summer S'mores S3	6	July 26, 2023	August 30, 2023
Summer S'mores S4	6	July 25, 2024	August 29, 2024
The Conan and Jordan Show	10	October 17, 2024	July 11, 2025
Summer S'mores S5	6	July 24, 2025	August 28, 2025
Summer S'pouses	6	July 30, 2026	September 3, 2026

=== Season 1 (2018–19) ===
No.	Title	"I feel ____ about being Conan O'Brien's friend"	Run Time	Original release date
1	"Will Ferrell"	"Awkward"	46:16	November 18, 2018
2	"Kristen Bell"	"Supercharged"	48:06	November 25, 2018
3	"Bill Burr"	"Great"	51:17	December 2, 2018
4	"Dax Shepard"	"Very optimistic"	48:54	December 9, 2018
5	"Nick Offerman & Megan Mullally"	"Ambivalent" and "Really good"	49:30	December 16, 2018
6	"Wanda Sykes"	"Somewhat trapped"	47:08	December 23, 2018
7	"Pete Holmes"	"Frustrated but honored"	47:33	December 30, 2018
8	"Marc Maron"	"Nervous"	46:36	January 6, 2019
9	"Adam Sandler"	"Stunned"	50:33	January 13, 2019
10	"Ron Funches"	"Grateful and excited"	46:15	January 20, 2019
11	"Dana Carvey"	"Masculine"	55:48	January 27, 2019
12	"David Sedaris"	"Apprehensive"	50:58	February 3, 2019
13	"Stephen Colbert"	"Cool"	54:51	February 10, 2019
14	"Timothy Olyphant"	"Meh"	1:00:37	February 17, 2019
15	"Jeff Goldblum"	"Well, I feel, let me be, uh, truthful, and I feel, well, to the extent that we're friends, I feel we have a deep connection, but I wish we'd spend more time together. I'm available for your friendship however time-consuming, or, uh, any-any aspect of it. We've been friends in the sense that we have, in the way that we have on these shows and seeing each other here and there. You've, of course, I've enrolled you in, I-I finagled you into being part of that show, that movie, little movie that I did and you were so sweet to do that and then, what else? Oh we did a, we did a, we were there at the voi-, at some voice over we were doing. It was one of your things, yes, yes, yes. So, and then, I think we- did I have a date with you, or just ran into you at the Soho House? That was lovely. And I've always said, yes, let's- and we've exchanged information, but we've never availed ourselves of it. I've always said let's come over to my house and let's do many things. I do all, all manner of things, so I-I, I-I love being your friend however it does or doesn't pan out. But I tell you again, I'm available for the deepest, closest, and most time-consuming kind of friendship."	59:36	February 24, 2019
16	"Lisa Kudrow"	"Tired"	1:01:55	March 3, 2019
16.5	"Jessie Gaskell & Mike Sweeney"	"Hungry" and "Starving"	31:39	March 6, 2019
17	"Thomas Middleditch & Ben Schwartz"	"Sizzlin'" and "Curious"	48:58	March 10, 2019
18	"Michelle Obama"	"Cautiously optimistic"	56:18	March 17, 2019
19	"Ray Romano"	"Good (with an exception)"	50:10	March 24, 2019
20	"Ben Stiller"	"Excited yet not holding my breath"	56:32	March 31, 2019
21	"Nicole Byer"	"Excited!"	51:49	April 7, 2019
22	"Patton Oswalt"	"Anxious"	1:02:55	April 14, 2019
23	"Tig Notaro"	"Glad"	1:02:13	April 21, 2019
24	"Robert Caro"	"Cautiously optimistic"	56:14	April 28, 2019
25	"Jimmy Kimmel"	"Sexually excited"	58:15	May 5, 2019
26	"Bill Hader"	"Great"	59:10	May 12, 2019
27	"Howard Stern"	"Badly (about not being Conan O'Brien's friend)"	1:30:41	May 19, 2019
28	"Bob Newhart"	"Anxious"	1:02:15	May 26, 2019
29	"Hannah Gadsby"	"Confused"	49:22	June 2, 2019
30	"Martin Short"	"Ashamed"	57:42	June 10, 2019
31	"Lin-Manuel Miranda"	"Great"	1:05:11	June 16, 2019
32	"Billy Eichner"	"Mixed"	1:02:46	June 24, 2019
33	"Mila Kunis"	"Indifferent"	1:02:56	July 1, 2019
34	"Andy Richter"	"Just fine"	58:00	July 8, 2019
35	"Kumail Nanjiani"	"Apologetic"	1:05:55	July 15, 2019
36	"Julia Louis-Dreyfus"	"A tad hopeful (but not really)"	1:01:52	July 22, 2019

=== Deep Dive with Dana Carvey (2019) ===
Features comedian Dana Carvey as co-host.

No.	Title	Run Time	Original release date
1	"Deep Dive with Dana Carvey 1"	26:52	August 4, 2019
2	"Deep Dive with Dana Carvey 2"	26:03	August 11, 2019
3	"Deep Dive with Dana Carvey 3"	24:29	August 19, 2019
4	"Deep Dive with Dana Carvey 4"	22:44	August 26, 2019
5	"Deep Dive with Dana Carvey 5"	25:09	September 1, 2019
6	"Deep Dive with Dana Carvey 6"	32:30	September 8, 2019

=== Season 2 (2019–20) ===
Episodes 37, 38, and 39 were rereleases of the Jeff Goldblum, Michelle Obama, and Bob Newhart episodes, respectively.

No.	Title	"I feel ____ about being Conan O'Brien's friend"	Run Time	Original release date
40	"David Letterman"	"My connection to Conan is endless admiration."	1:16:50	October 7, 2019
41	"Tina Fey"	"Good"	50:58	October 14, 2019
42	"John Oliver"	"Cautiously optimistic"	52:34	October 21, 2019
43	"Zach Galifianakis"	"Cautious"	59:30	October 28, 2019
44	"Neil Young"	"Good"	54:04	November 4, 2019
45	"Paul Rudd"	"Excited"	1:04:40	November 11, 2019
46	"Ellen DeGeneres"	"Honored"	50:44	November 18, 2019
47	"Eric Idle"	"Moderately aroused"	53:28	November 25, 2019
48	"Hillary Clinton & Chelsea Clinton"	"Great (but a little apprehensive)"	58:00	December 2, 2019
49	"Jack Black"	"Shitty"	1:01:12	December 9, 2019
50	"John Mulaney"	"Falsely modest"	1:01:51	December 16, 2019
51	"Malcolm Gladwell"	"Pressured"	54:22	December 23, 2019
52	"Al Franken"	"I'm already a fucking friend of Conan's"	58:04	December 30, 2019
53	"Charles Barkley"	"Great"	1:02:21	January 6, 2020
54	"Nikki Glaser"	"Overwhelmed"	57:53	January 13, 2020
55	"Eugene Levy & Catherine O'Hara"	"Absolutely delighted" and "Flattered and honored (that you would consider me your friend)"	1:00:48	January 20, 2020
56	"Jesse Eisenberg"	"Desperate"	54:00	January 27, 2020
57	"Sarah Silverman"	"Grateful"	56:22	February 3, 2020
58	"Keegan-Michael Key"	"Overwhelmed"	58:21	February 10, 2020
59	"Judd Apatow"	"Does not feel hopeful"	1:02:49	February 17, 2020
60	"Jim Gaffigan"	"Like Nikki Glaser felt"	59:27	February 24, 2020
61	"Ali Wong"	"Very new"	1:08:20	March 2, 2020
62	"Paul Reubens"	"Fantastic"	1:07:09	March 9, 2020
62.5	"Andy Daly"	"Conveniently located"	1:05:19	March 13, 2020
63	"Will Arnett"	"Pretty put out"	1:03:28	March 16, 2020
64	"Whitney Cummings"	"Stressed out"	57:29	March 23, 2020
65	"Steve Coogan"	"Quietly optimistic"	1:03:44	March 30, 2020
66	"D'Arcy Carden"	"Hopeful"	1:01:43	April 6, 2020
67	"Kevin Nealon"	"Confused that he's considered"	1:01:14	April 13, 2020
68	"Ricky Gervais"	"Strangely underwhelmed"	1:02:47	April 20, 2020
69	"Nick Kroll"	"Incredibly proud"	1:05:59	April 27, 2020
70	"Ted Danson"	"Oddly comforted"	1:03:54	May 4, 2020
71	"Mike Myers"	"Prehensile"	1:02:19	May 11, 2020
72	"J. J. Abrams"	"Exceedingly lucky"	1:10:41	May 18, 2020
73	"Russell Brand"	"Nervous"	1:01:41	May 25, 2020
74	"Rob Lowe"	"Optimistic"	1:03:24	June 1, 2020
75	"Amy Schumer"	"Fully indifferent"	1:02:00	June 8, 2020

=== Summer S'mores season 1 (& Tom Hanks) (2020) ===
No.	Title	"I feel ____ about being Conan O'Brien's friend"	Run Time	Original release date
76	"Summer S'mores with Conan and the Chill Chums 1"	No guest	30:08	June 15, 2020
77	"Summer S'mores with Conan and the Chill Chums 2"	No guest	28:29	June 22, 2020
78	"Summer S'mores with Conan and the Chill Chums 3"	No guest	30:54	June 29, 2020
79	"Tom Hanks"	"Grand"	1:13:07	July 7, 2020
80	"Summer S'mores with Conan and the Chill Chums 4"	No guest	28:27	July 13, 2020
81	"Summer S'mores with Conan and the Chill Chums 5"	No guest	32:21	July 20, 2020
82	"Summer S'mores with Conan and the Chill Chums 6"	No guest	30:37	July 27, 2020

=== Needs a Friend (2020–present) ===
After the first two seasons, the show abandoned the concept of seasons for podcasts.

No.	Title	"I feel ____ about being Conan O'Brien's friend"	Run Time	Original release date
83	"W. Kamau Bell"	"Cautiously optimistic, but still not great"	1:08:19	August 3, 2020
84	"Jim Carrey"	"Warm all over"	54:17	August 10, 2020
85	"Maya Rudolph"	"Pretty terrific"	1:06:14	August 17, 2020
86	"Michael Che"	"Honored"	1:06:20	August 24, 2020
87	"Jameela Jamil"	"Better about my hair"	1:07:09	August 31, 2020
88	"Deon Cole"	"Wonderful everytime [he's] with Conan O'Brien"	1:03:37	September 7, 2020
89	"Sean Hayes"	"Indifferent"	59:38	September 14, 2020
90	"Keith Urban"	"Incredibly confused"	53:05	September 21, 2020
91	"Rory Scovel"	"Grateful about being Conan O'Brien's best friend"	1:00:30	September 28, 2020
92	"Michelle Obama Returns"	"Very, very hopeful"	49:06	September 30, 2020
93	"Colin Quinn"	"Euphoric"	1:04:28	October 5, 2020
94	"Willie Nelson"	"Great"	1:00:38	October 12, 2020
95	"Hillary Clinton Returns"	"Enthusiastic"	59:43	October 14, 2020
96	"Rashida Jones"	"Fine"	1:11:11	October 19, 2020
97	"Bruce Springsteen"	"Ecstatic"	56:02	October 26, 2020
98	"Jim Parsons"	"Okay (about people saying that me and Conan O'Brien are friends)"	55:09	November 2, 2020
99	"Sam Richardson"	"Honored and obligated"	55:30	November 9, 2020
100	"John Leguizamo"	"Great"	1:02:03	November 16, 2020
101	"Kevin Hart"	"Extremely blessed"	1:04:18	November 23, 2020
102	"Kristin Chenoweth"	"Petite about...peeing?"	50:47	November 30, 2020
103	"John Cleese"	"Morally imperative"	53:20	December 7, 2020
104	"Kaley Cuoco"	"Giddy"	1:00:30	December 14, 2020
105	"Amy Sedaris"	"Bullied (into being Conan's friend)"	1:00:59	December 21, 2020
106	"Matthew Rhys"	"Blank"	1:02:27	December 28, 2020
107	"J. B. Smoove"	"As though Conan is taking advantage of me and he's putting pressure on people to be his friend"	1:01:06	January 4, 2021
107.5	"Ron Reagan"	—	53:46	January 7, 2021
108	"Fred Armisen"	"Productive"	56:36	January 11, 2021
109	"Anthony Anderson"	"Bloated, hungover, and constipated"	59:28	January 18, 2021
110	"Mike Birbiglia"	"Terrified"	1:01:05	January 25, 2021
111	"Bryan Cranston"	"Very lucky about being happily paid"	56:34	February 1, 2021
112	"David Spade"	"Sort of excited"	57:07	February 8, 2021
113	"Dave Grohl"	"Somewhat conflicted"	1:02:44	February 15, 2021
114	"Kenan Thompson"	"Great"	1:06:51	February 21, 2021
115	"Jane Lynch"	"Chosen and honored"	58:57	March 1, 2021
116	"Angela Kinsey & Jenna Fischer"	"Zippy" and "Super-duper excited"	55:27	March 8, 2021
117	"Shaquille O'Neal"	"Enigmatic"	1:08:08	March 15, 2021
118	"Kate Hudson"	"Insecure"	51:40	March 22, 2021
119	"Seth Meyers"	"Anxious and excited"	58:46	March 29, 2021
120	"Adam McKay"	"Old-fashioned-twelve-year-old-about-to-have-a-sleepover excited"	58:24	April 5, 2021
121	"Bob Odenkirk"	"Confused"	56:54	April 12, 2021
122	"Abbi Jacobson"	"Scrumptious"	54:36	April 19, 2021
123	"JB Smoove Returns (with Miles Grose)"	"Optimistic" (and "Awkward")	53:27	April 26, 2021
124	"Eric Andre"	"Titillated"	1:05:23	May 3, 2021
125	"Seth Rogen"	"Fantastic"	1:04:30	May 10, 2021
126	"Jake Tapper"	"Cromulent"	1:02:20	May 17, 2021
127	"Tracee Ellis Ross"	"Really strange, excited, a little squirrelly"	58:22	May 24, 2021
128	"President Barack Obama"	"Ambivalent"	1:04:03	May 31, 2021
129	"John Krasinski"	"Effervescent"	56:25	June 7, 2021
130	"Kathryn Hahn"	"Like she'd be lying about"	59:23	June 14, 2021
131	"Desus & Mero"	"Like a diversity hire" and "semi-aroused"	59:51	June 21, 2021
132	"Bill Burr Returns"	"Honored"	1:00:54	June 28, 2021
133	"Sean Penn"	"Relieved"	1:00:59	July 4, 2021
134	""Weird Al" Yankovic"	"Figuratively tickled pink"	57:13	July 11, 2021
135	"Daniel Radcliffe"	"Cautiously optimistic"	54:24	July 18, 2021
136	"John Wilson"	"Very fortunate...?"	1:01:55	July 25, 2021
137	"Flula Borg"	"Mmmmmh…oooooooh"	59:42	August 1, 2021
138	"Cecily Strong"	"Honored"	55:22	August 8, 2021
139	"Michael Keaton"	"So happy about being here & being Conan O'Brien's friend"	59:25	August 15, 2021
140	"Hannah Einbinder"	"Confused"	1:02:41	August 22, 2021
141	"Joel McHale"	"A little anxious, but good"	1:06:19	August 29, 2021
142	"Kristen Schaal"	"Relieved"	1:00:47	September 5, 2021
143	"Alan Yang"	"Weirdly fulfilling a childhood dream-thing"	57:47	September 12, 2021
143.5	"Conan Talks About Norm Macdonald (with Andy Richter & Frank Smiley)"	–	1:08:27	September 16, 2021
144	"Melissa McCarthy"	"Just delightful"	1:03:27	September 19, 2021
145	"Tiffany Haddish"	"Amazing"	1:02:06	September 26, 2021
146	"Anderson Cooper"	"Kind of thrilled that he can be considered"	1:02:49	October 3, 2021
147	"Jake Gyllenhaal"	"So many things"	1:04:39	October 10, 2021
148	"Simon Rich"	"Extremely grateful"	53:18	October 17, 2021
149	"Daniel Sloss"	"Privileged"	1:11:52	October 24, 2021
150	"Elvis Costello"	"Splendiferous"	1:24:14	October 31, 2021
151	"Rachel Dratch"	"Overly excited"	1:07:28	November 7, 2021
151.5	"Live with Will Arnett at the Wiltern Theatre"	"Absolutely estatic"	1:29:30	November 10, 2021
152	"Howie Mandel"	"Fantastic"	1:02:22	November 14, 2021
153	"John Lithgow"	"Is already Conan O'Brien's friend"	57:24	November 21, 2021
154	"Ellie Kemper"	"Thrilled"	57:49	November 29, 2021
155	"Lea DeLaria"	"Is gagging"	1:01:11	December 5, 2021
156	"Will Forte"	"Honored"	59:36	December 12, 2021
157	"Quentin Tarantino"	"Trepidatious"	1:08:30	December 14, 2021
158	"Jim Gaffigan Returns"	"Ecstatic"	1:00:51	December 19, 2021
159	"Kieran Culkin"	"Goal-achieved"	1:00:53	December 26, 2021
160	"Chris Redd"	"lucky as a motherfucker"	59:03	January 2, 2022
161	"Zach Galifianakis Returns"	"Sincere"	1:08:53	January 9, 2022
162	"Bowen Yang"	"Dissociative"	1:02:54	January 16, 2022
163	"Patton Oswalt & Meredith Salenger"	"100% not embarrassed" and "so blessed"	57:59	January 23, 2022
164	"Moses Storm"	"Psychotic"	56:08	January 30, 2022
164.5	"Justice Sonia Sotomayor"	"Intimidated"	1:08:06	February 2, 2022
165	"Judy Greer"	"Privileged"	1:02:38	February 6, 2022
166	"Marshawn Lynch"	"Blessed"	1:06:27	February 13, 2022
167	"Slash"	"Pretty damn good"	1:00:19	February 20, 2022
168	"Mike Schur"	"Fine"	1:07:17	February 27, 2022
169	"Julie Bowen"	"Cautiously optimistic"	1:07:35	March 6, 2022
170	"David Cross"	"Envious"	1:00:39	March 13, 2022
171	"Tracy Morgan"	"Bloated"	1:06:46	March 20, 2022
172	"Paul Rudd Returns"	"Heart-warmed"	1:11:59	March 27, 2022
173	"Aimee Mann"	"Apprehensive"	57:23	April 3, 2022
174	"Nick Offerman Returns"	"Earnestly grateful"	1:05:02	April 10, 2022
175	"Stephen Merchant"	"Overqualified"	1:00:03	April 17, 2022
176	"Molly Shannon"	"Proud"	1:06:33	April 24, 2022
177	"John Mulaney Returns"	"Irregardless"	1:10:01	May 1, 2022
178	"Paul F. Tompkins"	"Cautiously optimistic"	1:01:12	May 8, 2022
179	"Elle Fanning"	"Honored"	1:05:47	May 15, 2022
179.5	"Live with Bill Hader at the Wiltern Theater"	"Thrilled"	1:22:43	May 17, 2022
180	"Tig Notaro Returns"	"Gay"	1:10:16	May 22, 2022
181	"Professor Brian Cox"	"Has no idea how to feel"	55:52	May 30, 2022
182	"Jeff Goldblum Returns"	(three and a half minutes into a conversation that began with the standard intro) "Being here with you now, as if I am revealing myself to myself, AND... AND I feel utterly drenched and purged"	1:30:54	June 6, 2022
183	"Vanessa Bayer"	"Honestly thrilled"	58:23	June 13, 2022
184	"David Sedaris Returns"	"Fantastic"	1:15:19	June 20, 2022
185	"Jack White"	"Magnanimous"	1:15:05	June 27, 2022
186	"Taylor Tomlinson"	"Braggadocious"	1:03:25	July 3, 2022
187	"Dana Carvey Returns"	"Stupefied"	1:13:39	July 10, 2022
188	"Steven Yeun"	"Ecstatic"	1:05:11	July 17, 2022
189	"Nikki Glaser Returns"	"Chill"	1:13:50	July 24, 2022
190	"B. J. Novak"	"Excited, but cautious"	1:03:27	July 31, 2022
190.5	"Conan Sits Down with his Significant Other (with Liza Powel O’Brien)"	–	21:01	August 4, 2022
191	"Jeff Ross"	"Tan"	1:03:56	August 7, 2022
192	"Aubrey Plaza"	"Totally fine"	1:03:04	August 14, 2022
193	"Nicole Byer Returns"	"Giddy"	1:08:07	August 21, 2022
194	"Luke Wilson"	"That, on the advice of my counsel, it's best that I've agree to be clear about being Conan O'Brien's friend"	1:02:58	August 28, 2022
195	"James Burrows"	"Sanguine"	1:02:27	September 4, 2022
196	"Leslie Jones"	"Could give a shit if I was"	58:44	September 11, 2022
197	"Jack McBrayer"	"Honored"	1:14:50	September 18, 2022
198	"Billy Eichner Returns"	"Over the goddamn moon"	1:02:43	September 25, 2022
199	"Mila Kunis Returns"	"Irrelevant"	1:06:52	October 2, 2022
200	"Rivers Cuomo"	"Excited"	1:05:17	October 9, 2022
201	"Jon Bernthal"	"Extraordinarily lucky"	1:05:51	October 16, 2022
202	"Kevin Nealon Returns"	"Obligated"	1:07:31	October 23, 2022
203	"Colin Hanks"	"Excited (?)"	1:06:31	October 30, 2022
204	"J. B. Smoove Live from the SiriusXM Garage"	"Frustrated"	1:23:50	November 1, 2022
205	"Nick Kroll Returns"	"Strongly"	1:08:27	November 6, 2022
206	"Bill Burr Live from the SiriusXM Garage"	"Alright" and "So special"	1:13:53	November 8, 2022
207	"Kumail Nanjiani Returns"	"Skeptical"	1:02:01	November 13, 2022
208	"Tracy Morgan Live at the Beacon Theater"	"Like a man"	1:17:00	November 20, 2022
209	"Stephen Colbert Live at the Beacon Theater"	"Put upon"	1:16:30	November 27, 2022
210	"Lizzy Caplan"	"Confused"	1:10:20	December 4, 2022
211	"Randall Park"	"Neither here nor there"	1:05:42	December 11, 2022
212	"Michelle Obama Returns Again"	"Less cautious"	1:04:45	December 18, 2022
213	"Ed Helms"	"Humbled"	58:10	December 25, 2022
214	"Penn Badgley"	"The dull echo of imposter syndrome"	1:07:23	January 1, 2023
215	"Bryan Cranston Returns"	"Stimulated"	1:11:33	January 8, 2023
216	"Ramy Youssef"	"The inevitability of God coming into our lives"	1:13:09	January 15, 2023
217	"Timothy Olyphant Returns"	"Splendiferous"	1:06:31	January 22, 2023
218	"Vir Das"	"Unique"	58:42	January 29, 2023
219	"Sarah Silverman Returns"	"Ambivalent"	1:08:35	February 5, 2023
220	"Jane Fonda"	"So, really deeply happy and excited"	1:04:26	February 12, 2023
221	"Jason Segel"	"Very happy"	1:01:35	February 19, 2023
222	"Elizabeth Banks"	"Cautiously optimistic"	1:02:29	February 26, 2023
223	"Norah Jones"	"Ecstatic"	1:11:05	March 5, 2023
224	"Michelle Zauner"	"Elated"	1:01:41	March 12, 2023
224.5	"Neil Young and the Songs That Inspired Him"	-	1:01:27	March 14, 2023
225	"Chris Martin"	"Really great"	1:02:22	March 19, 2023
226	"Billie Eilish and Finneas"	"Really excited" and "Dubious"	1:10:02	March 26, 2023
227	"Zach Braff"	"So honored"	1:04:29	April 2, 2023
228	"Al Franken Returns"	"Privileged"	1:00:36	April 9, 2023
229	"Julia Louis-Dreyfus Returns"	"Not much"	1:01:02	April 16, 2023
230	"Lars Ulrich"	"Psyched"	1:03:33	April 23, 2023
231	"Charlie Day"	"Euphoric"	54:02	April 30, 2023
232	"Steven Wright"	"Anxious"	1:03:15	May 7, 2023
233	"Javier Bardem"	"Scared"	1:04:06	May 14, 2023
234	"Bill Hader Returns"	"Tired"	58:32	May 21, 2023
235	"Sebastian Maniscalco"	"Honored"	59:30	May 28, 2023
236	"Sharon Horgan"	"Exhausted"	58:32	June 4, 2023
237	"Claire Danes"	"Decidedly giddy"	58:39	June 11, 2023
238	"Eric Andre Returns"	"Moist"	1:02:32	June 18, 2023
238.5	"Kelly Clarkson"	"Honored and super cheesy"	1:11:18	June 21, 2023
239	"Sir Paul McCartney"	"Wildly elated"	1:08:21	June 25, 2023
240	"Harrison Ford"	"Confused"	1:00:51	July 2, 2023
241	"Jake Tapper Returns"	"Ironic"	1:00:22	July 9, 2023
242	"Patton Oswalt Returns"	"Radiant"	59:11	July 16, 2023
242.5	"Billy Corgan and the Songs That Inspired Him"	–	1:21:43	July 18, 2023
243	"David Byrne"	"Carefree and buoyant"	57:47	July 23, 2023
244	"Roy Wood Jr."	"Thankful"	57:39	July 30, 2023
245	"Matthew Rhys Returns"	"Equal parts confused and terrified"	1:02:23	August 6, 2023
246	"John Mulaney Returns Again"	"Cornered"	1:06:03	August 13, 2023
247	"Steve Martin and Martin Short"	"Sad about being Conan O'Brien's only friend" and "Duped"	1:09:07	August 20, 2023
248	"Liam Neeson"	"Like he wants to sing, but also a bit nervous"	1:06:16	August 27, 2023
249	"Questlove"	"(...) fine"	1:11:24	September 3, 2023
250	"Cedric the Entertainer"	"Short, indifferent, sometimes angry"	1:02:05	September 10, 2023
251	"Maria Bamford"	"Excited...(if he needs her friendship)"	1:03:42	September 17, 2023
252	"Jim Downey"	"Entirely unapologetic"	1:01:25	September 24, 2023
253	"Ed Sheeran Live from the SiriusXM Garage"	"Wank"	1:21:20	October 1, 2023
254	"Arnold Schwarzenegger"	"How the fuck would I know?"	1:16:22	October 9, 2023
255	"Sir Patrick Stewart"	"Proud, happy, honored"	1:01:58	October 15, 2023
256	"Dave Grohl, Krist Novoselic, and "In Utero" producer Steve Albini"	"Good", "jazzy" and "anxiety"	1:17:36	October 22, 2023
257	"Ambassador Rahm Emanuel"	"Feels a tremendous amount of self-loathing"	1:00:42	October 26, 2023
258	"Werner Herzog"	"A little bit weird"	1:04:08	October 29, 2023
259	"Reggie Watts"	"Quixotic"	1:02:43	November 5, 2023
260	"Please Don't Destroy (with Special Guest Paul Rudd) Live at the Brooklyn Academy of Music"	"Too young"	1:10:15	November 12, 2023
261	"Flula Borg Returns"	"Okay"	1:03:08	November 19, 2023
262	"Mike Birbiglia Returns"	"Ambitious"	1:01:43	November 26, 2023
263	"Robert Smigel (and Triumph the Insult Comic Dog)"	"Very proud to be Marc Maron's friend"	1:09:00	December 3, 2023
264	"Adam Driver Live at the Brooklyn Academy of Music"	"Thrilled"	1:19:02	December 10, 2023
265	"Albert Brooks and Rob Reiner"	"Confused" and "almost honored"	1:08:43	December 17, 2023
266	"President Joe Biden"	"Lucky… then again, I guess it’s because I’m Irish"	46:38	December 19, 2023
267	"Gary Gulman"	"Ecstatic"	1:01:24	December 24, 2023
268	"Jordan Peele"	"Honored, absolutely honored"	59:17	December 31, 2023
269	"Kurt Russell and Wyatt Russell from SiriusXM Miami Studios"	"Totally justified" and "a strong sense of impending doom"	58:48	January 7, 2024
270	"Niecy Nash"	"Feels very sexy"	01:06:59	January 14, 2024
271	"Natasha Lyonne"	"A totally normal person, feels blank"	58:09	January 21, 2024
272	"John Mayer"	"Accepted"	1:07:16	January 28, 2024
273	"Kaley Cuoco Returns"	"Suspicious"	1:06:15	February 4, 2024
274	"Larry David"	"So-so"	1:05:08	February 11, 2024
275	"Tracee Ellis Ross Returns"	"Delighted"	1:08:22	February 18, 2024
276	"Adam Sandler Returns"	"Sad"	1:01:21	February 25, 2024
277	"Chelsea Peretti"	"Excited"	1:04:37	March 3, 2024
278	"Melinda French Gates"	"Like a bit of a newbie"	39:10	March 6, 2024
279	"Zach Woods"	"Pick me"	1:03:55	March 10, 2024
280	"Jon Bon Jovi"	"Mildly amused"	58:57	March 18, 2024
281	"Kristen Wiig"	"Warm"	58:29	March 24, 2024
282	"Carol Burnett"	"So much love"	58:09	March 31, 2024
283	"W. Kamau Bell Returns"	"Insistent"	1:02:24	April 7, 2024
284	"Goldie Hawn"	"Really excited"	1:04:32	April 14, 2024
285	"Jimmy Carr"	"Contractually obliged"	1:03:15	April 21, 2024
286	"Taylor Tomlinson Returns"	"Thrilled"	59:39	April 28, 2024
287	"Brian Setzer and the Songs That Inspired Him"	-	57:18	April 30, 2024
288	"Tiffany Haddish Returns"	"Exuberated"	1:01:11	May 5, 2024
289	"Paul Scheer"	"Sanguine"	1:03:45	May 12, 2024
290	"John C. Reilly Live From The Orpheum Theatre"	"Fucking stoked"	1:23:34	May 19, 2024
291	"Chris Robinson"	"Confused"	1:02:37	May 26, 2024
292	"Ron Howard"	"Frankly indifferent"	1:05:38	June 2, 2024
293	"David Oyelowo"	"Winningest"	1:04:08	June 9, 2024
294	"Ted Danson & Woody Harrelson"	"Scared" and "supercalifragilistic"	1:04:06	June 16, 2024
295	"Susie Essman"	"Tickled pink"	1:04:08	June 23, 2024
296	"Andy Daly Returns"	"Loud"	1:10:45	June 30, 2024
297	"Rashida Jones Returns"	"Blank"	1:04:30	July 7, 2024
298	"James Corden"	"Delighted"	1:03:31	July 14, 2024
299	"Lisa Kudrow Returns"	"Good – no, really good"	1:13:21	July 21, 2024
300	"Nikki Glaser Returns Again"	"Ecstatic, honored, and quite tan"	1:02:33	July 28, 2024
301	"Jack Black Returns"	"Magnificent"	1:01:33	August 4, 2024
302	"Beastie Boys: Michael Diamond & Adam Horovitz"	Mike feels "Optimistically uncertain", Adam "certainly like to be, but is not yet"	1:03:02	August 11, 2024
303	"Walton Goggins"	"Cozy"	1:04:17	August 18, 2024
304	"Alex Edelman"	"Apprehensive"	1:00:22	August 25, 2024
305	"Don Cheadle"	"Delighted"	1:01:25	September 1, 2024
306	"Jeff Bridges"	"Very open & lot of love"	1:06:27	September 8, 2024
307	"Uzo Aduba"	"Interested"	58:34	September 15, 2024
308	"Deon Cole Returns"	"Amazing"	1:07:41	September 22, 2024
309	"Jon Stewart"	"Honored. Honored!"	1:11:10	September 29, 2024
310	"Quinta Brunson"	"Optimistic"	1:06:29	October 6, 2024
311	"Al Pacino"	"Hopeful"	1:11:59	October 13, 2024
312	"Ezra Koenig"	"Cautiously optimistic"	1:09:44	October 20, 2024
313	"Billy Crystal"	"Just not sure"	1:04:48	October 27, 2024
314	"Tom Hanks Returns"	"Blank"	1:10:39	November 3, 2024
315	"Eric Idle Returns"	"Horny"	1:00:53	November 10, 2024
316	"Josh Brolin"	"So Don Cheadle"	1:06:20	November 17, 2024
317	"Jim Gaffigan Returns Again"	"Privileged"	1:04:49	November 24, 2024
318	"Malcolm Gladwell Returns"	"Mixed feelings"	1:03:21	December 2, 2024
319	"Elle Fanning Returns"	"Ecstatic"	1:04:01	December 8, 2024
320	"Jesse Eisenberg Returns"	"Unconflicted"	1:05:44	December 15, 2024
321	"2024 Memorable Moments: Conan, Sona, & Matt"	-	1:06:32	December 22, 2024
322	"2024 Memorable Moments: Celebrity Interviews"	-	1:00:11	December 29, 2024
323	"Nicholas Hoult"	"Truly happy"	1:02:37	January 5, 2025
324	"Jeff Goldblum Returns (Re-Release)"	"Utterly drenched and purged"	1:30:54	January 12, 2025
325	"Conan, Sona, & Matt Discuss the LA Fires"	-	43:52	January 19, 2025
326	"Ben Stiller Returns"	"…hmmm…"	1:08:41	January 26, 2025
327	"Kaitlin Olson"	"Apprehensive"	1:03:22	February 2, 2025
328	"Kevin Nealon Returns Again"	"Absolutely duped"	1:09:16	February 9, 2025
329	"Adam Scott"	"Pure joy"	1:06:36	February 16, 2025
330	"Jason Bateman"	"Pretty Good"	1:03:04	February 23, 2025
331	"Lizzy Caplan Returns"	"Meh, had better"	1:04:53	March 2, 2025
332	"Amy Poehler"	"Nostalgic"	1:02:14	March 9, 2025
333	"Bill Burr Returns Again"	"Good"	1:03:13	March 16, 2025
334	"Danny McBride"	"Righteous"	1:00:46	March 23, 2025
335	"John Mulaney Returns Once More"	"Litigious"	1:00:02	March 30, 2025
336	"Christina Ricci"	"Pretty good"	1:00:52	April 6, 2025
337	"Nathan Lane"	"It's about fucking time he was asked"	58:39	April 13, 2025
338	"Carol Leifer"	"Fresh"	1:01:33	April 20, 2025
339	"Bill Hader Returns Again"	"Grateful"	56:44	April 27, 2025
340	"Christina Applegate and Jamie-Lynn Sigler"	"Awesome" and "giddy"	1:00:30	May 4, 2025
341	"Ryan Reynolds"	"Philodendrous"	1:05:04	May 11, 2025
342	"Sarah Silverman Returns Again"	"Rejoice/dead inside"	1:02:22	May 18, 2025
343	"Paul W. Downs"	"Thrilled"	1:03:44	May 25, 2025
344	"Adam DeVine"	"Exuberant"	59:34	June 2, 2025
345	"Ron Chernow"	"Very warmly about anyone who has won the Mark Twain Award for American Humor, including our friend Conan"	1:00:54	June 5, 2025
346	"Mike Birbiglia Returns Again"	"Earnest"	1:04:52	June 9, 2025
347	"David Spade Returns"	"Somewhat sick"	1:02:23	June 16, 2025
348	"Diego Luna"	"Really comfortable"	1:03:38	June 23, 2025
349	"Martin Short Live from SiriusXM NY"	"Duped"	1:09:23	June 29, 2025
350	"Ayo Edebiri"	"Optimistic"	1:01:21	July 6, 2025
351	"Kesha"	"Cunty"	1:03:10	July 14, 2025
352	"Marc Maron Returns"	"Happy"	27:03	July 16, 2025
353	"Flula Borg Returns Again"	"Su-sussudio"	61:00	July 21, 2025
354	"Andy Samberg"	"Aces"	1:05:26	July 27, 2025
355	"Timothy Olyphant Returns Again"	"So wonderful, as almost as if I was given a beach house, but one that I don't frequent"	1:06:51	August 4, 2025
356	"Bob Odenkirk Returns"	"Chocolate chip"	1:00:45	August 11, 2025
357	"Jessica Williams"	"Pressured"	1:01:07	August 18, 2025
358	"Greg Daniels"	"Outraged"	1:04:38	August 25, 2025
359	"Chris Fleming"	"In the constant threat of physical danger"	1:04:20	September 1, 2025
360	"Nate Bargatze"	"A heaviness"	58:50	September 8, 2025
361	"Spinal Tap Live from the SiriusXM Garage"	Spinal Tap: "Mixed" - Martin Di Bergi: "Very Happy"	1:17:20	September 15, 2025
362	"Janelle James"	"Excited"	1:00:45	September 22, 2025
363	"Andy Richter Returns"	"Resentful that it took it to be on Dancing with the Stars for Conan O'Brien to remember that I'm his friend"	30:22	September 24, 2025
364	"Werner Herzog Returns"	"Elevated, weightless"	1:06:28	September 29, 2025
365	"Charlie Sheen"	"Enchanted"	1:04:18	October 6, 2025
366	"Rose Byrne"	"Delighted"	1:04:06	October 13, 2025
367	"Bill Burr Live from the Fonda Theater in Hollywood"	"--"	1:01:57	October 15, 2025
368	"Mary Bronstein"	"Destined"	49:07	October 16, 2025
369	"Tom Holland and Dominic Sandbrook of The Rest Is History Podcast"	"Surprisingly aroused" and "Chuffed"	1:01:10	October 20, 2025
370	"Judd Apatow Returns"	"Needy"	1:04:18	October 27, 2025
371	"Claire Danes Returns"	"Blessed"	52:47	November 3, 2025
372	"Rachel Sennott"	"Included"	58:59	November 10, 2025
373	"Paul Scheer Returns"	"Optimistic"	1:02:46	November 17, 2025
374	"Leanne Morgan"	"Tickled"	1:01:53	November 24, 2025
375	"Matthew Rhys Returns Again"	"Ashamed"	1:01:59	December 1, 2025
376	"Will Arnett Returns"	"Just fine"	1:02:35	December 8, 2025
377	"Kumail Nanjiani Returns Again"	"Twitterpated"	1:01:43	December 15, 2025
378	"James L. Brooks"	"Quizzical"	1:00:36	December 22, 2025
379	"Paul Rudd Returns Again"	"Chuffed"	1:04:23	December 29, 2025
380	"D'Arcy Carden Returns"	"Literally very happy"	1:05:38	January 5, 2026
381	"Matt Damon"	"Good"	1:00:36	January 12, 2026
382	"Jodie Foster"	"Ambivalent"	1:06:52	January 19, 2026
383	"Charli XCX"	"Nervous"	1:04:39	January 26, 2026
384	"Josh Safdie"	"Like a liar saying he feels anything"	1:04:37	February 2, 2026
385	"Kevin Nealon Returns Once More"	"Nothing"	1:01:12	February 9, 2026
386	"Halle Berry"	"Still Ghosted"	1:03:58	February 16, 2026
387	"Denis Leary"	"I could give a fuck... because I'm already his fucking cousin"	1:05:04	February 23, 2026
388	"Johnny Knoxville"	"harder than a turnbuckle"	1:01:32	March 2, 2026
389	"Wanda Sykes Returns"	"Indifferent"	55:54	March 9, 2026
390	"Lisa Kudrow Returns Again"	"Still really good"	1:03:17	March 16, 2026
391	"Ken Burns"	"Hopeful"	1:02:58	March 23, 2026
392	"Arsenio Hall"	"Relieved"	1:10:44	March 30, 2026
393	"Elizabeth Banks Returns"	"Blessed"	1:01:48	April 6, 2026
394	"David Oyelowo Returns"	"Conan-ified"	1:02:21	April 13, 2026
395	"Dan Levy"	"Thrilled, titillated, excited, and stimulated"	1:04:43	April 20, 2026
396	"Ike Barinholtz"	"Bullish"	1:15:50	April 27, 2026
397	"Zach Galifianakis Returns"	"Zach Galifianakis"	1:13:03	May 4, 2026
398	"Billie Eilish Returns"	"Really good"	1:04:01	May 11, 2026
399	"Charlie Puth"	"Blank"	1:06:35	May 18, 2026
400	"Olivia Munn"	"Excited and amazed"	1:10:06	May 25, 2026
401	"Andrew Scott"	"Tá áthas ar ("happy" in Irish)"	1:03:22	June 1, 2026
402	"Patton Oswalt Returns Again"	"Relieved"	1:11:41	June 8, 2026
403	"Atsuko Okatsuka"	Honored and a little suspicious	1:11:08	June 15, 2026
404	"Josh Groban"	Downright giddy	1:11:32	June 22, 2026
405	"Eric Andre Returns Again"	Like sandpaper	1:09:16	June 29, 2026
406	"Danny McBride Returns"	Thrilling	57:15	July 6, 2026
407	"Mick Jagger"	Rather anxious	1:00:01	July 13, 2026
408	"Molly Shannon Returns"	Proud and cool	1:10:43	July 20, 2026
409	"Leslie Jones Returns"	So conflicted	1:10:45	July 27, 2026
410	"Ice Cube"	He’s about to throw up in his mouth	1:03:25	August 3, 2026
411	"Greta Lee"	Excited	1:06:03	August 10, 2026
412	"Gillian Anderson"	Nonplussed	1:04:06	August 17, 2026
413	"John Cena"	Curiously enthusiastic	1:17:09	August 24, 2026
414	"Andy Daly Returns"	At peace	1:06:55	August 31, 2026
415	"Matt Groening"	Honored	1:05:06	September 7, 2026
416	"Taylor Tomlinson Returns Again"	Gobsmacked	1:07:46	September 14, 2026
417	"Joel McHale Returns"	Blank	1:04:57	September 21, 2026
418	"Matthew McConaughey & Woody Harrelson"	Very Irish and like a True American	1:04:43	September 28, 2026
419	"Owen Wilson"	Good	1:03:14	October 5, 2026
420	"Kyle MacLachlan"	Fortunate	1:03:04	October 12, 2026
421	"Martin Short Returns Again"	Sexually excited	1:01:42	October 19, 2026
422	"Olivia Harrison"	Sillier	55:56	October 22, 2026
423	"Michael Douglas"	Excited	1:01:35	October 26, 2026
424	"Olivia Colman"	Incredibly excited	1:02:38	November 2, 2026
425	"Dustin Hoffman Part I"	Would feel great	1:03:43	November 9, 2026
426	"Dustin Hoffman Part II"	--	37:31	November 11, 2026
427	"Adam Brody"	Jazzed, enthused, and optimistic	1:00:18	November 16, 2026

=== Needs a Fan (2021–present) ===
No.	Title	Run Time	Original release date
1 (121.5)	"Fanhausen"	29:37	April 15, 2021
2 (122.5)	"The Student Has Become the Master"	24:50	April 22, 2021
3 (123.5)	"Fiki's Gambit"	25:35	April 29, 2021
4 (124.5)	"Fruit, There It Is"	25:07	May 6, 2021
5 (125.5)	"Avery Blaze"	20:38	May 13, 2021
6 (126.5)	"Beef Stock Bouillon Broth"	22:23	May 20, 2021
7 (127.5)	"Don't Sit Down on Wet Grass"	32:19	May 27, 2021
8 (128.5)	"Sasha and the Massive Tea Cup"	25:13	June 2, 2021
9 (129.5)	"Energeeza"	29:24	June 9, 2021
10 (130.5)	"Conezone"	29:36	June 16, 2021
11 (131.5)	"Dr. FUPA"	19:02	June 23, 2021
12 (132.5)	"Pre Bottled Urine"	30:27	June 30, 2021
13 (133.5)	"Quoll-nan O'Brien"	19:42	July 7, 2021
14 (134.5)	"Maker's on the Rocks"	18:20	July 14, 2021
15 (135.5)	"Uncle Chutney and the Bubble Bunch"	33:39	July 21, 2021
16 (136.5)	"Haunted Hoochie"	20:47	July 28, 2021
17 (137.5)	"Down to the Cockaroo"	21:22	August 4, 2021
18 (138.5)	"Pen Pals"	24:49	August 11, 2021
19 (139.5)	"Therizinosaurus O'Brien"	21:31	August 18, 2021
20 (140.5)	"Coroner O'Brien"	19:49	August 25, 2021
21 (141.5)	"A Cobb Salad for the Lady"	21:41	September 1, 2021
22 (142.5)	"Whip It Well"	21:15	September 8, 2021
23 (143.5)	"A.T.O.S"	27:06	September 15, 2021
24 (144.5)	"Roller Girl"	20:14	September 22, 2021
25 (145.5)	"The Dungeonmaster"	20:28	September 29, 2021
26 (146.5)	"The Looming Comedian"	19:58	October 6, 2021
27 (147.5)	"Hometown Dermatologist"	19:30	October 13, 2021
28 (148.5)	"A Belgian in France"	17:34	October 20, 2021
29 (149.5)	"Mike Sweeney and Jessie Gaskell"	41:55	October 27, 2021
30 (150.5)	"Karaoke Tribal Law"	19:17	November 3, 2021
31 (151.51)	"Pharmacies and Fast Food in Cairo"	24:18	November 11, 2021
32 (152.5)	"Thinking About Stew"	20:14	November 17, 2021
33 (153.5)	"Trapped and Neutered"	23:39	November 24, 2021
34 (154.5)	"Kidditch Camp"	17:44	December 1, 2021
35 (155.5)	"The Professional Patient"	23:11	December 8, 2021
36 (157.5)	"Turner Classic Wine Club"	18:24	December 15, 2021
37 (158.5)	"A Lesson in Provinces"	19:22	December 22, 2021
38 (159.5)	"C.U.T.I.E."	22:24	December 29, 2021
39 (160.5)	"Skull Soup"	20:00	January 5, 2022
40 (161.5)	"The Fiddler and the Ski Mall"	17:24	January 12, 2022
41 (162.5)	"Dating Your Family in Iceland"	21:43	January 19, 2022
42 (163.5)	"An American in Scotland"	19:09	January 26, 2022
43 (164.51)	"Tanks for the Memories"	24:36	February 2, 2022
44 (165.5)	"The Need for Weed"	19:36	February 9, 2022
45 (166.5)	"An Eye for an Eye"	22:24	February 16, 2022
46 (167.5)	"Oops, All Ads!"	50:21	February 22, 2022
47 (167.51)	"Phil the D!@k Whittler"	22:10	February 23, 2022
48 (168.5)	"Livin' the Dean"	21:38	March 2, 2022
49 (169.5)	"The Mafia Puppy Doctor"	22:12	March 9, 2022
50 (170.5)	"Lux et Veritas"	21:55	March 16, 2022
51 (171.5)	"Social Morays"	22:42	March 23, 2022
52 (172.5)	"Rest in Pee Wee"	19:26	March 30, 2022
53 (173.5)	"The High Priestess"	22:25	April 6, 2022
54 (174.5)	"Gonzo's Nose"	28:25	April 13, 2022
55 (175.5)	"The Emotional Health of My Don Johnson"	23:45	April 20, 2022
56 (176.5)	"Melissa and the Cherry Wood Hand"	20:07	April 27, 2022
57 (177.5)	"The Body Man"	24:11	May 4, 2022
58 (178.5)	"The Stressed Pelvis"	27:39	May 11, 2022
59 (179.5)	"Shawshank O'Brien"	16:33	May 18, 2022
60 (180.5)	"Cat Shaming"	20:11	May 25, 2022
61 (181.5)	"Safari So Goody"	24:51	June 1, 2022
62 (188.5)	"Space Porn"	27:52	July 20, 2022
63 (189.5)	"21st Century Bangable"	17:37	July 27, 2022
64 (190.5)	"912, What’s Your Emergency?"	20:59	August 3, 2022
65 (191.5)	"The ‘Couve"	18:22	August 10, 2022
66 (192.5)	"The Motorcycle Diaries"	23:31	August 17, 2022
67 (193.5)	"The Worst Cow Thief"	21:08	August 24, 2022
68 (194.5)	"The Juili Juanka of Juárez"	24:03	August 31, 2022
69 (195.5)	"Bedside Conan"	22:49	September 7, 2022
70 (196.5)	"Brazilian Butt Lift"	19:32	September 14, 2022
71 (197.5)	"The Naked Therapist"	16:39	September 21, 2022
72 (198.5)	"Aguerotic Flux"	23:24	September 28, 2022
73 (199.5)	"Recessive Elegance"	18:49	October 5, 2022
74 (200.5)	"Zero Degrees Kelvin"	27:21	October 12, 2022
75 (201.5)	"Kee-ra Attack!"	23:21	October 19, 2022
76 (202.5)	"Amir from Iran"	46:16	October 26, 2022
77 (204.5)	"Inaction Figure"	19:29	November 2, 2022
78 (206.5)	"Goulash on the Beach"	20:41	November 9, 2022
79 (207.5)	"The Stranger"	25:41	November 16, 2022
80 (208.5)	"Need, by Conan O'Brien"	20:29	November 23, 2022
81 (209.5)	"Party in My Mouth"	22:16	November 30, 2022
82 (210.5)	"The Thing"	22:07	December 7, 2022
83 (211.5)	"Welcome to the Jungle"	19:57	December 14, 2022
84 (212.5)	"Ashley Flowers from Crime Junkie"	17:05	December 21, 2022
85 (213.5)	"Undercover Rabbi"	24:34	December 28, 2022
86 (214.5)	"Klingons and Cowboys"	22:12	January 4, 2023
87 (215.5)	"Red Ass-fault"	23:05	January 11, 2023
88 (216.5)	"C.S.I. Kansas City"	30:07	January 18, 2023
89 (217.5)	"Underground Museum Coffee"	15:59	January 25, 2023
90 (218.5)	"Name Name"	19:33	February 1, 2023
91 (219.5)	"Keepin' It in the Family"	16:52	February 8, 2023
92 (220.5)	"Conapotamia"	17:11	February 15, 2023
93 (221.5)	"Hear Ye, Hear Ye!"	24:19	February 22, 2023
94 (222.5)	"We DO Talk About Bruno"	18:49	March 1, 2023
95 (223.5)	"DJ Jazzy Josh"	20:41	March 8, 2023
96 (224.6)	"Swipeout"	21:27	March 15, 2023
97 (225.6)	"Lost in Translation"	16:50	March 22, 2023
98 (226.5)	"Is It a Party in Here?"	26:04	March 29, 2023
99 (227.5)	"Let Him Do His Bits"	27:52	April 6, 2023
100 (228.5)	"Singapore Sona"	21:42	April 12, 2023
101 (229.5)	"Ink-a-Dink"	24:33	April 19, 2023
102 (230.5)	"Spatchcocking"	18:59	April 26, 2023
103 (231.5)	"Fun Facts About Colombia"	23:19	May 3, 2023
104 (232.5)	"The Rolls Royce of Vikings"	27:25	May 10, 2023
105 (233.5)	"The Amiable Assassin"	18:41	May 17, 2023
106 (234.5)	"He's Just Quite III"	22:13	May 24, 2023
107 (235.5)	"41 Insults"	21:01	May 31, 2023
108 (236.5)	"Yo Soy Messi"	17:57	June 7, 2023
109 (237.5)	"The Ice Machine"	20:56	June 17, 2023
110 (238.5)	"Tomato Soup Chin"	18:33	June 21, 2023
111 (239.5)	"What’s the Craic?"	22:17	June 28, 2023
112 (240.5)	"Paddywhackery"	25:33	July 5, 2023
113 (241.5)	"Weird Around the Eyes"	16:40	July 12, 2023
114 (242.5)	"Off to the Ice Follies"	18:46	July 19, 2023
115 (249.5)	"Would You Like a Selfie?"	19:52	September 6, 2023
116 (250.5)	"Bike Pervert"	21:08	September 13, 2023
117 (251.5)	"Yope"	21:21	September 20, 2023
118 (252.5)	"Craic Mechanic"	24:47	September 27, 2023
119 (253.5)	"The Life of Reilly"	22:47	October 4, 2023
119 (253.5)	"The Life of Reilly"	22:47	October 4, 2023
120 (254.5)	"I’ve Needled Many a Perineum"	24:39	October 11, 2023
121 (255.5)	"Sgt. Microphone Glassian"	23:07	October 18, 2023
122 (256.5)	"The Gossip Girl of Thames New Zealand"	17:52	October 25, 2023
123 (258.5)	"Three Days from Retirement"	19:19	November 1, 2023
124 (259.5)	"Old Sharp-Ass"	18:22	November 8, 2023
125 (260.5)	"It’s Wine O’Clock Everywhere"	25:29	November 15, 2023
126 (261.5)	"Married with No Benefits"	25:48	November 22, 2023
127 (262.5)	"Medicine Is the Best Medicine"	20:27	November 29, 2023
128 (263.5)	"People Be Doin’ It"	19:03	December 6, 2023
129 (264.5)	"Conan Gourley"	17:27	December 13, 2023
130 (266.5)	"Blueberry Jam"	19:58	December 20, 2023
131 (267.5)	"The Hoppining: A Chill Chums Holiday Whodunit"	1:02:07	December 27, 2023
132 (268.5)	"Sean and the Snapping Turtle"	19:32	January 3, 2024
133 (269.5)	"Muahaha"	22:40	January 10, 2024
134 (270.5)	"Separated at Birth"	19:51	January 17, 2024
135 (271.5)	"Slimealier"	21:90	January 24, 2024
136 (272.5)	"Car Talk"	18:36	January 31, 2024
137 (273.5)	"Conan’s Number One Fan"	19:07	February 7, 2024
138 (274.5)	"The Valentine’s Day Matchmaker Special"	27:41	February 14, 2024
139 (275.5)	"Goofy Goo"	18:24	February 21, 2024
140 (276.5)	"Questions 3"	24:38	February 28, 2024
141 (279.5)	"The Game Master"	17:24	March 13, 2024
142 (280.5)	"Indecent Proposal: Czechoslovakia"	32:19	March 20, 2024
143 (281.5)	"My Ghoulish Figure"	21:47	March 27, 2024
144 (282.5)	"Rum and Cokes in the Bathroom"	21:39	April 3, 2024
145 (283.5)	"Amish Brotherhood"	20:25	April 10, 2024
146 (284.5)	"Conan O'Brien Must Go Writers Roundtable"	49:21	April 17, 2024
147 (284.9)	"Conan O'Brien Must Go Fan Compilation"	07:06	April 18, 2024
148 (285.5)	"Ding Dong v. Ring Ding"	23:19	April 24, 2024
149 (286.6)	"Hot Ones Medical Check with Dr. Arroyo"	20:43	May 1, 2024
150 (287.5)	"In Cyberspace, No One Can Hear You Scream"	23:29	May 8, 2024
151 (288.5)	"Minecraft"	21:11	May 15, 2024
152 (289.1)	"Vinyl Sneak Peek"	06:31	May 21, 2024
153 (289.5)	"Weekend at Conan’s"	25:45	May 22, 2024
154 (290.5)	"Lani with an Ā"	27:15	May 29, 2024
155 (291.5)	"Unleash the Kraken"	22:25	June 5, 2024
156 (292.5)	"Why Is Your Poop a Rainbow?"	20:33	June 12, 2024
157 (293.5)	"The Looming Loom"	21:05	June 19, 2024
158 (294.5)	"A Hint of Lube"	21:13	June 27, 2024
159 (295.5)	"Scurvy Rag Doll"	19:20	July 3, 2024
160 (296.5)	"Avalanche Terrain"	20:30	July 10, 2024
161 (297.5)	"Couldn’t Have Done It Without Me"	25:20	July 17, 2024
162 (304.5)	"Jules Is Always Right"	27:37	September 5, 2024
163 (305.5)	"Slush Metal"	24:17	September 11, 2024
164 (306.5)	"Longest Fixed Borders in History"	22:59	September 18, 2024
165 (307.5)	"I’m a Very Normal Person with Very Normal Hobbies"	17:49	September 25, 2024
166 (308.5)	"Claro Que Si"	19:42	October 2, 2024
167 (309.5)	"Conan and the Chill Amigas"	24:05	October 9, 2024
168 (310.5)	"The Last DVD Store"	25:47	October 16, 2024
169 (10206)	"Oatmeal Milk"	18:34	October 23, 2024
170 (10207)	"It’s an Honor Just to Be Engaged"	19:31	October 30, 2024
171 (10208)	"Don’t Sit Under the Walnut Tree"	20:25	November 6, 2024
172 (10209)	"Grand Theft Rickshaw"	20:14	November 13, 2024
173 (10211)	"Charles and the Chocolate Factory"	25:44	November 20, 2024
174 (10212)	"The Sona and Matt of New Zealand"	18:30	November 27, 2024
175 (10213)	"Never Ask Directions in Rabat"	19:43	December 4, 2024
176 (10214)	"You Are So President Taft"	19:34	December 11, 2024
177 (10216)	"Club Grub Hub"	24:50	December 18, 2024
178 (10217)	"Rascally Nincompoop"	23:22	December 25, 2024
179 (10218)	"Move Motherfucker!"	21:33	January 1, 2025
180 (10219)	"Suspiciously Healthy"	19:48	January 8, 2025
181 (10221)	"Fanhausen (Re-Release)"	24:58	January 15, 2025
182 (10222)	"Power Point Night"	19:42	January 22, 2025
183 (10223)	"One Ring to Rule Them All"	20:24	January 29, 2025
184 (10224)	"Canada O’Brien"	22:27	February 5, 2025
185 (10225)	"The Mothman Cometh"	19:49	February 12, 2025
186 (10227)	"The Cock of the Rock"	24:56	February 19, 2025
187 (10228)	"Get Over Myself!"	18:39	February 26, 2025
188 (10229)	"This Is My Deal Here, Wade"	20:34	March 5, 2025
189 (10232)	"Conan Recaps the Oscars with Mike Sweeney"	41:28	March 12, 2025
190 (10230)	"I Hate Richmond"	23:28	March 19, 2025
191 (10233)	"Long in the Leg"	28:52	March 26, 2025
192 (10234)	"Conan Recaps the Mark Twain Prize Ceremony with Mike Sweeney"	41:28	April 2, 2025
193 (10235)	"Snack Attack with Talent Coordinator Maddie Ogden"	24:26	April 9, 2025
194 (10238)	"The Double-Billed QuixlQuaxl in Honor of Aadu (Re-Release)"	27:05	April 14, 2025
195 (10237)	"We’re gettin’ Belayed!"	27:49	April 16, 2025
195 (10239)	"Conan’s Own"	20:00	April 23, 2025
196 (10240)	"Drainin’ Treys and Drivin’ Holes"	19:56	April 30, 2025
197 (10241)	"Conan O’Brien Must Go: Spain Roundtable Discussion"	24:04	May 7, 2025
198 (10243)	"Conan O’Brien Must Go: New Zealand Roundtable Discussion"	23:51	May 14, 2025
198 (10244)	"Conan O’Brien Must Go: Austria Roundtable Discussion"	24:25	May 21, 2025
199 (10245)	"Lats and Longs"	21:12	May 28, 2025
200 (10246)	"The Conan Slabaroo"	22:50	June 11, 2025
201 (10248)	"Snack Attack Strikes Back with Talent Coordinator Maddie Ogden"	16:33	June 18, 2025
202 (10249)	"Bitches Be Hitchin’"	25:43	June 25, 2025
203 (10250)	"Jüs’d"	24:57	July 2, 2025
204 (10251)	"The Bear and the Bath"	25:29	July 10, 2025
205	"Don’t Look a Gift Horse Meat in the Mouth"	21:30	September 4, 2025
206	"Born to Be Badminton"	19:49	September 11, 2025
207	"Snack Attack III: Rise of the Meat Flute"	20:12	September 18, 2025
208	"That Zagrebian ’Tude"	20:28	September 25, 2025
209	"Don’t Look a Gift Horse Meat in the Mouth Yet Again"	26:17	October 2, 2025
210	"Hot Athens"	21:13	October 9, 2025
211	"Matt Gourley Needs a Fan"	23:05	October 23, 2025
212	"The Tallest Thing in Marrakesh"	19:38	October 30, 2025
213	"Play It Again, Yassir"	17:30	November 6, 2025
214	"A Strong Dose"	27:14	November 13, 2025
215	"Putting the Fun Back in Funeral with Special Guest Paul Scheer"	25:27	November 20, 2025
216	"Classic Colonizer"	21:53	November 27, 2025
217	"The House Dick"	17:41	December 4, 2025
218	"Cocoland"	23:26	December 11, 2025
219	"It’s a Small World in Here"	18:28	December 18, 2025
220	"Limp Paddle With Special Guest D’Arcy Carden"	26:32	December 25, 2025
221	"Scents and Sensibility"	22:39	January 1, 2026
222	"The Jazz Singer"	19:38	January 8, 2026
223	"Bley’s Fastballs Part I"	20:02	January 15, 2026
224	"Bley’s Fastballs Part II"	20:23	January 22, 2026
225	"A Clown Is Not An Alibi"	18:27	January 29, 2026
226	"We Have A Condom For That"	24:38	February 5, 2026
227	"The Prophet and The Reacharound with Special Guest Kevin Nealon"	23:33	February 12, 2026
228	"12 Clomp Program"	19:51	February 19, 2026
229	"Staff Review With Brian Kiley"	26:52	February 26, 2026
230	"Staff Review With Todd Levin"	27:39	March 5, 2026
231	"Staff Review With Skyler Higley"	30:06	March 12, 2026
232	"Staff Review With Laurie Kilmartin"	25:07	March 19, 2026
233	"Interrupto!"	20:05	March 26, 2026
234	"Fanhausen Revisited"	15:15	April 2, 2026
235	"The Freedom Reader"	26:58	April 9, 2026
236	"Conan Vs. Edibles Part I"	15:18	April 16, 2026
237	"The State Of The Entertainment Business With Jeff Ross"	24:51	April 23, 2026
238	"Cover Your Hole"	27:17	April 30, 2026
239	"Peeping Cooper"	23:53	May 7, 2026
240	"OBGYN Baaaaby"	25:21	May 14, 2026
241	"Conan Vs. Edibles Part II"	22:57	May 21, 2026
242	"The Big Bird Fluffer"	22:42	May 28, 2026
243	"Conan’s Harvard Commencement Address"	25:14	June 2, 2026
244	"Oh Walt Whitman!"	24:42	June 4, 2026
245	"Sword Play"	26:31	June 11, 2026
246	"The Bonering Conan"	27:45	June 18, 2026
247	"Conan and Sona in Morocco"	31:39	June 25, 2026
248	"Conan vs. Edibles Part III"	24:19	July 2, 2026
249	"The Wedding Ringer"	19:42	July 9, 2026
250	"Conan Unboxes “Toy Story” Merch"	21:55	July 16, 2026
251	"Knife Porn"	31:54	July 23, 2026
252	"Comedy Crimes with Andy Daly"	23:40	September 10, 2026
253	"The Body Politic Part I"	29:33	September 17, 2026
254	"The Body Politic Part II"	29:23	September 24, 2026
255	"Conan O’Brien Must Go: Season 3 Roundtable Discussion Part I"	27:41	October 1, 2026
256	"Conan O’Brien Must Go: Season 3 Roundtable Discussion Part II"	34:45	October 8, 2026
257	"Bubble Gum and Cyanide"	26:13	October 15, 2026
258	"Find The Communist!"	23:51	October 29, 2026
259	"For the Love of Butts"	27:01	November 5, 2026
260	"Taps with Andy Richter"	27:43	November 12, 2026
261	"Staff Review With Sarah Federowicz"	25:52	November 19, 2026

=== Summer S'mores season 2 (2022) ===
Starting with the second season, Summer S'mores became an annual sub-series instead of replacing regular podcast episodes. Filmed on location at Gourley's home in Pasadena.

No.	Title	Run Time	Original release date
1	"Summer S'mores with Conan and the Chill Chums Season 2 Episode 1"	28:31	June 9, 2022
2	"Summer S'mores with Conan and the Chill Chums Season 2 Episode 2"	34:07	June 16, 2022
3	"Summer S'mores with Conan and the Chill Chums Season 2 Episode 3"	28:34	June 23, 2022
4	"Summer S'mores with Conan and the Chill Chums Season 2 Episode 4"	31:31	June 30, 2022
5	"Summer S'mores with Conan and the Chill Chums Season 2 Episode 5"	37:02	July 7, 2022
6	"Summer S'mores with Conan and the Chill Chums Season 2 Episode 6"	30:54	July 14, 2022

=== The Lost Hans and Franz Movie (2023) ===
Features comedians Dana Carvey, Kevin Nealon, and Robert Smigel as co-hosts.

No.	Title	Run Time	Original release date
1	"The Lost Hans and Franz Movie Episode 1"	34:40	May 17, 2023
2	"The Lost Hans and Franz Movie Episode 2"	27:46	May 24, 2023
3	"The Lost Hans and Franz Movie Episode 3"	25:00	May 31, 2023
4	"The Lost Hans and Franz Movie Episode 4"	32:39	June 8, 2023

=== Summer S'mores season 3 (2023) ===
Filmed on location at a facility in Larchmont.

No.	Title	Run Time	Original release date
1	"Summer S'mores with Conan and the Chill Chums Season 3 Episode 1"	21:38	July 26, 2023
2	"Summer S'mores with Conan and the Chill Chums Season 3 Episode 2"	28:36	August 2, 2023
3	"Summer S'mores with Conan and the Chill Chums Season 3 Episode 3"	35:12	August 9, 2023
4	"Summer S'mores with Conan and the Chill Chums Season 3 Episode 4"	35:06	August 16, 2023
5	"Summer S'mores with Conan and the Chill Chums Season 3 Episode 5"	30:16	August 23, 2023
6	"Summer S'mores with Conan and the Chill Chums Season 3 Episode 6"	24:43	August 30, 2023

=== Summer S'mores season 4 (2024) ===
Filmed on location at Movsesian's home in Altadena.

No.	Title	Run Time	Original release date
1	"Summer S'mores with Conan and the Chill Chums Season 4 Episode 1"	25:30	July 25, 2024
2	"Summer S'mores with Conan and the Chill Chums Season 4 Episode 2"	29:36	August 1, 2024
3	"Summer S'mores with Conan and the Chill Chums Season 4 Episode 3"	27:50	August 8, 2024
4	"Summer S'mores with Conan and the Chill Chums Season 4 Episode 4"	36:32	August 15, 2024
5	"Summer S'mores with Conan and the Chill Chums Season 4 Episode 5"	40:00	August 22, 2024
6	"Summer S'mores with Conan and the Chill Chums Season 4 Episode 6"	27:56	August 29, 2024

=== The Conan and Jordan Show (2024–25) ===
Re-aired episodes of the radio show that was previously exclusive to SiriusXM. It features associate producer Jordan Schlansky as co-host, psychologists John Gottman and Julie Schwartz Gottman as guests for the fourth episode, musician Geddy Lee as a guest for the sixth episode and linguist Luke Ranieri as a guest for the ninth episode.

No.	Title	Run Time	Original release date
1	"Debut Episode"	44:22	October 17, 2024
2	"Lady Crackers"	30:01	November 14, 2024
3	"Show & Tell"	46:27	December 12, 2024
4	"Marriage Counseling"	61:01	January 10, 2025
5	"Consumer Watchdog"	48:43	February 13, 2025
6	"Geddy Lee"	33:46	March 13, 2025
7	"Travel Memories"	39:33	April 10, 2025
8	"Beet Red Face"	37:14	May 8, 2025
9	"Luke Ranieri"	37:29	June 13, 2025
10	"Painting the Barn"	38:25	July 11, 2025

=== Summer S'mores season 5 (2025) ===
Filmed on location at the Team Coco offices in Larchmont.

No.	Title	Run Time	Original release date
1	"Summer S'mores with Conan and the Chill Chums Season 5 Episode 1"	25:26	July 24, 2025
2	"Summer S'mores with Conan and the Chill Chums Season 5 Episode 2"	30:17	July 31, 2025
3	"Summer S'mores with Conan and the Chill Chums Season 5 Episode 3"	26:53	August 7, 2025
4	"Summer S'mores with Conan and the Chill Chums Season 5 Episode 4"	30:34	August 14, 2025
5	"Summer S'mores with Conan and the Chill Chums Season 5 Episode 5"	27:49	August 21, 2025
6	"Summer S'mores with Conan and the Chill Chums Season 5 Episode 6"	28:01	August 28, 2025

=== Summer S'pouses (2026) ===
A spin-off of the annual Summer S'mores sub-series, it features O'Brien, Movsesian, and Gourley interviewing their respective spouses.

No.	Title	Run Time	Original release date
1	"Summer S'pouses Episode 1"	22:12	July 30, 2026
2	"Summer S'pouses Episode 2: Amanda Lund"	28:41	August 6, 2026
3	"Summer S'pouses Episode 3: Tak Boroyan"	23:14	August 13, 2026
4	"Summer S'pouses Episode 4: Liza Powel O'Brien"	20:00	August 20, 2026
5	"Summer S'pouses Episode 5: The Spouses Alone"	23:53	August 27, 2026
6	"Summer S'pouses Episode 6: The Spouses Reunited"	20:21	September 3, 2026
