= Joshua Macht =

American journalist

- Born: Joshua David Macht; January 16, 1969 (age 56); Boston, Massachusetts, U.S.
- Education: Wellesley High School
- Alma mater: Bates College; Harvard University
- Occupation: Publishing Executive

Joshua David Macht (born January 16, 1969) is an American publishing executive, journalist, and media commentator. He was senior executive vice president and chief product innovation officer of Harvard Business Publishing before assuming the role of acting chief executive officer in 2021. He was previously group publisher of the Harvard Business Review Group.

Macht joined HBR from TIME magazine where was the editor and general manager of TIME.com. He was also the magazine's technology editor. Before that, he was a journalist at Inc. magazine where he became the editor and co-founder of Inc.com.

He was born in Boston and attended Wellesley High School. He is a graduate of Bates College and Harvard University.
