= Jordan Schlansky =

American television producer

- Education: University at Buffalo
- Occupation: Television producer
- Years active: 1994–present

Jordan Schlansky is an American television producer known primarily for producing Conan O'Brien's talk shows Late Night with Conan O’Brien and Conan.

== Early life ==
Schlansky grew up on Long Island, New York. His family is of Polish descent. He attended the University at Buffalo.

== Career ==
Schlansky began working at NBC’s Late Night with Conan O’Brien as an intern in 1994. After receiving several promotions, culminating in the position of associate producer, Schlansky accompanied O'Brien to Los Angeles to produce The Tonight Show with Conan O'Brien. Although Schlansky made cameo appearances on Conan as early as 1995, it wasn't until the 2008 writer's strike when O'Brien scheduled an impromptu interview with Schlansky that led to a regular segment. In a TeamCoco Q&A, O'Brien stated that the initial segments with Schlansky generated a "cult of Jordan."

Remote segments with Schlansky and O'Brien have included couples counseling, coffee tasting, escape rooms and personal intervention on location in parts of the world such as Italy, Japan, Argentina and Austria. On the October 30, 2020 podcast Inside Conan, comedian Robert Smigel credited Schlansky for having introduced television audiences to his puppet persona Triumph the Insult Comic Dog. In the final week of Conan, host O'Brien jokingly looked back on 26 years of working with Schlansky and said: "I still have no idea what he does for my show.” Beginning in December 2023, O'Brien and Schlansky began hosting The Conan & Jordan Show on Conan O'Brien Radio SiriusXM.

== Personal life ==
A Star Wars fan since childhood, Schlansky believes the saga is the "greatest story ever told". His knowledge gained him the title "Resident 'Star Wars' expert" on Late Night with Conan O'Brien. In various remote segments with O'Brien, Schlansky revealed that he met his wife at a CVS and that O'Brien threw him a bachelor party, much to his displeasure.

== Work ==
=== Television ===
- Late Night with Conan O'Brien: 10th Anniversary Special (2003) – associate producer
- Late Night with Conan O'Brien: The Best of Triumph the Insult Comic Dog (2004) – producer, director
- Late Night with Conan O'Brien (2003–2009) – associate producer
- The Tonight Show with Conan O'Brien (2009–2010) – producer
- Conan (2010–2020) – associate producer
- Conan O'Brien Must Go (2024–present) – supervising producer

=== Radio ===
- The Conan & Jordan Show (2023–present) – co-host

== Awards and nominations ==
Year	Association	Award category	Result
2007	The Office: The Accountants	Daytime Emmy	Won
2007	Pale Force	Daytime Emmy	Nominated
2024	Conan O'Brien Must Go	Primetime Emmy	Nominated
2025	Conan O'Brien Must Go	Primetime Emmy	Won
