= Sona Movsesian =

Executive assistant and podcast host (born 1982)

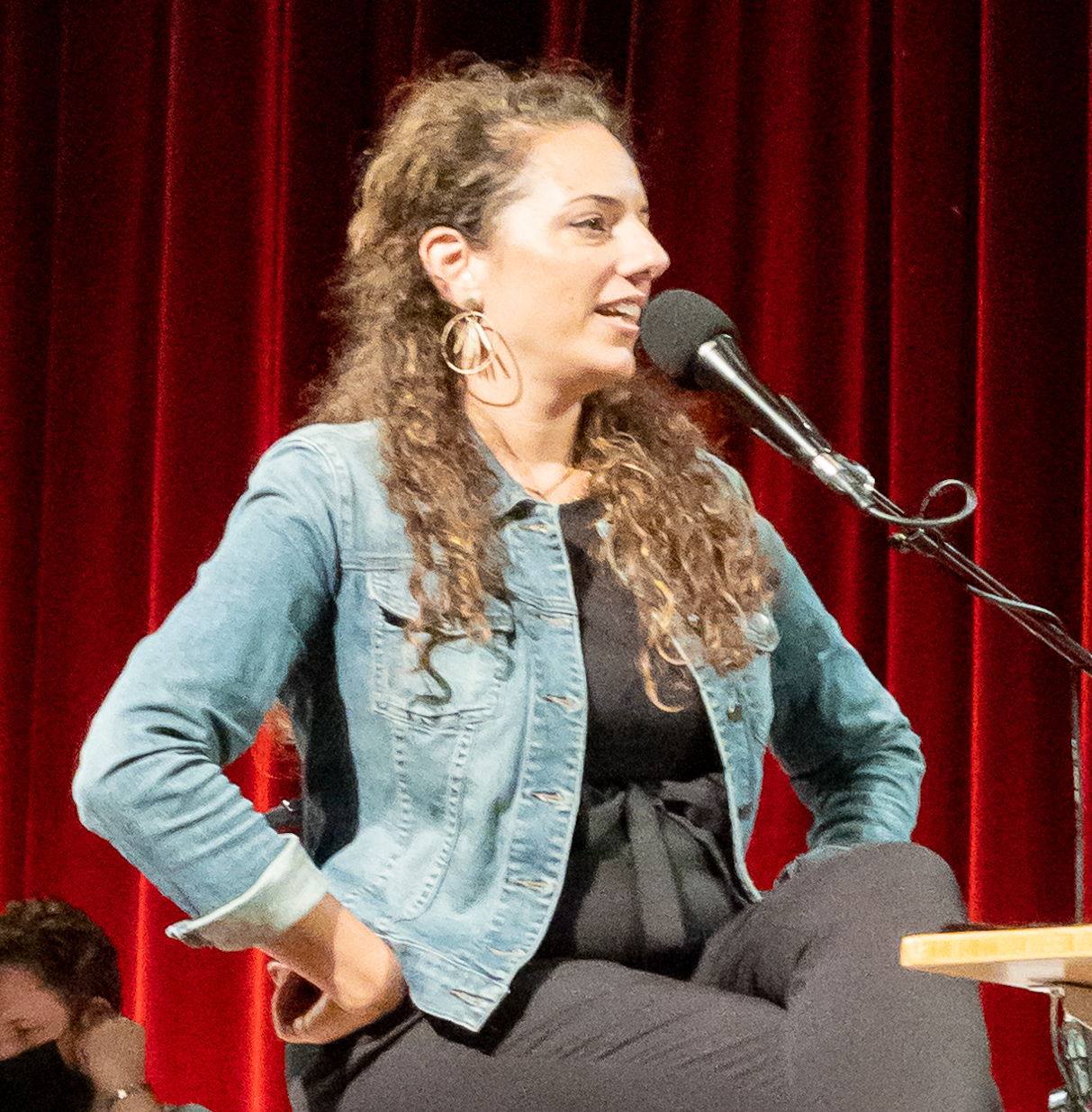
- Movsesian in September 2022
- Born: Talin Sona Movsesian; October 13, 1982 (age 43); Montebello, California, U.S.
- Education: Mt. San Antonio College; University of Southern California
- Occupations: Podcast co-host; former full-time assistant
- Years active: 2009–present
- Notable work: Conan O'Brien Needs a Friend; The World's Worst Assistant
- Spouse: Tak Boroyan (m. 2018)
- Children: 2

Talin Sona Movsesian (Armenian: Թալին Սօնա Մովսէսեան; born October 13, 1982) is an American podcast co-host, author, comedian, media personality, and occasional executive assistant. She began as the personal assistant of late-night talk show host Conan O'Brien starting in 2009, and featured in show segments, including as a guest in 2019. Movsesian has co-hosted the podcast Conan O'Brien Needs a Friend since 2018. In 2022, she released a humorous how-to book titled The World's Worst Assistant, which became a New York Times Best Seller.

== Early life ==
Talin Sona Movsesian was born on October 13, 1982, in Montebello, California, to Gulbenk and Nadia (née Cakmak) Movsesian, an Armenian family, and grew up in Hacienda Heights, California, where she attended the Armenian Mesrobian School. She has one sibling, a brother. At the age of 20, while attending Mt. San Antonio College (Mt. SAC), Movsesian became National Speech Champion. After transferring from Mt. SAC, Movsesian graduated from the University of Southern California in 2005 with a degree in communication.

== Career ==
Movsesian worked at NBC initially as a page and Events and Operations Coordinator. She became O'Brien's assistant in 2009 while he was hosting The Tonight Show with Conan O'Brien. Movsesian credits Nate Kirtman for helping her get this position. Movsesian appeared in several episodes of The Tonight Show and Conan, and features prominently in the 2011 documentary Conan O'Brien Can't Stop. As an important moment defining her relationship with O'Brien, Movsesian points to a 2014 segment where, after she sent out a company-wide email complaining about her stolen Gigolos mug, Conan brought his camera team to do a full investigation. In 2015, she appeared alongside O'Brien in the television special Conan in Armenia, which revolved around O'Brien taking his assistant to Armenia to connect with her heritage. Movsesian and O'Brien's relationship has been described as atypical for a boss and his assistant, with Movsesian reveling in goofing off. This playful laziness and dysfunctional dynamic was often a source of comedy in Movsesian's appearances on the show and on the podcast. Movsesian said, "He saw something in me that was valuable in a different way besides someone who was the perfect assistant, and that was someone who would screw up and give him fodder for comedy. Sometimes for comedians, that's so much more valuable."

In 2016, for the 50th anniversary of the Armenian Mesrobian School, Movsesian received the "Mesrobian Spirit Award" for her role in bringing Armenia to the attention of viewers of Conan in Armenia.

In 2018, Movsesian began co-hosting the podcast Conan O'Brien Needs a Friend alongside O'Brien and podcaster Matt Gourley.

On July 11, 2019, O'Brien interviewed Movsesian on Conan after scheduled guest Kumail Nanjiani had to cancel at the last minute.

She also voices the character of Princess Sugar Salt, a character in Power Players, an American French cartoon.

She was named 2023 Alumni of the Year by Mt. SAC.

In 2023, Movsesian participated in Armenian Film Society's Armenian Women in Film and Entertainment panel discussion. She returned in 2024 as a moderator.

=== Author ===
On June 18, 2021, Movsesian announced she was writing a book titled The World's Worst Assistant, a humorous how-to guide. The book was released on July 19, 2022, and includes a foreword written by Conan O'Brien. It was a New York Times Best Seller, debuting at number six in the category of "Advice, How-To & Miscellaneous". Writing for The New York Times, Chris Kornelis characterized the book as being about "how two flawed people who were meant to be together found each other."

Her second book, The World's Worst Mom, comes out in September 2026.

== Personal life ==
Movsesian married graphic artist Artak "Tak" Boroyan in 2018. An Armenian Orthodox Christian, Movsesian married Boroyan at Holy Cross Apostolic Cathedral in Montebello, California. She announced on episode 113 of Conan O'Brien Needs a Friend that the couple was expecting twin boys. She posted on her Instagram account stating she gave birth on July 1, 2021, to her two sons, one week after the final show of Conan. The family also has a dog named Oki.

Movsesian’s grandparents were displaced by the Armenian genocide, with her great-grandparents being killed and her grandparents migrating from Armenia to Turkey and finally to the United States as a result.

Movsesian lost her Altadena home on January 7, 2025, to the Eaton Fire during the 2025 Southern California wildfires. As of 2026, Movsesian was in the process of rebuilding the Altadena home.

== Bibliography ==
- Movsesian, Sona (July 19, 2022). The World's Worst Assistant. Penguin Publishing Group. ISBN 9780593185513.
- Movsesian, Sona (September 1, 2026). The World's Worst Mom. Penguin Group. ISBN 9798217046706.
