= Tanya Ryno =

American television producer and businesswoman

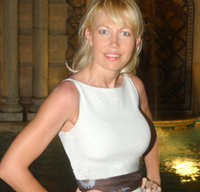
- Tanya Ryno
- Born: Tanya Lynn Grondin; May 19, 1970 (age 56)
- Occupations: Producer; Businesswoman
- Years active: 1992-present
- Spouse: Jim Ryno (m. 1996)
- Children: 2
- Website: iron-house.co

Tanya Ryno is an American television producer and businesswoman. She was Saturday Night Live 's film segment producer/head of production during the 1990s and produced many of the commercial parodies for which the show is noted along with the animated TV Funhouse segments. Ryno was one of very few women producing comedy sketches and animation shorts in the 1990s, with the organization Women in Animation originating several years after her career began. She is now the founder of a luxury home gym design, longevity and wellness firm that has been featured in Architectural Digest, Forbes, and House Beautiful Magazine

== Early life ==
Ryno was born in Fort Lee (Virginia), at the Kenner Army Health Clinic, and is the daughter of Stephen Wayne Grondin and Donna Ruth Kitchen. Shortly after her birth, her father was transferred to the Supreme Headquarters Allied Powers Europe, the NATO headquarters in Belgium where they lived until 1972. From there her family moved to Bangor, Maine, where her parents were from. The next several years, Tanya's family would move to a new school district, almost annually, until she was a teenager where her parents settled in Hampden, Maine, so that she could attend all four years at Hampden Academy.

Tanya was an only child, until her parents divorced. She now has one half-brother, Wyatt, and three step-sisters. After high-school, she moved to Florida to attend The Art Institute of Fort Lauderdale before transferring to the School of Visual Arts in New York City.

== Career ==
=== Early career ===
While attending college in Florida, Ryno began her career as a photographer and editor for a small publication in South Beach, Miami called Talent Times Magazine. When she transferred to the School of Visual Arts, in NYC, she continued as a photographer's assistant for several high profile fashion photographers.

=== Saturday Night Live ===
In the early 1990s, Tanya started working at Saturday Night Live. And in addition to the commercial parodies, Tanya was a producer for Robert Smigel's TV Funhouse series, including the award-winning Ambiguously Gay Duo, which was voiced by Steve Carell and Stephen Colbert, The X-Presidents, and Fun with Real Audio. She even produced the GoLords (Stop Motion) Puppet series written by Andrew Steele, which was short lived, but had a cult-like following. Tanya was also a producer for several prime time specials including The Best of Chris Farley compilation and The Best of Phil Hartman. The commercial parodies, she's best known for include: AM Ale, featuring David Koechner, Big Brawn Feminine Napkins, featuring Will Ferrell and Molly Shannon, Caribbean Essence Bath Oil, featuring Tracy Morgan and Cheri Oteri, Cookie Dough Sport, featuring Will Ferrell, and Martha Stewart's Topless Christmas Special., featuring Ana Gasteyer.

Tanya's most controversial segments were: One TV Funhouse segment, written by Robert Smigel that's claim to fame is that it only aired once. On the March 14, 1998 episode, featuring Julianne Moore and The Backstreet Boys. The segment titled "Conspiracy Theory Rock" was banned by Lorne Michaels immediately after it aired. The other controversial segment Tanya was a producer on involved the Heaven's Gate Cult and mass suicide, where all the members were found wearing the same pair of Nike sneakers. Within days of the event, Saturday Night Live aired a satirical commercial parody that incorporated some of the actual news footage of the dead members, from their legs down, wearing Nike shoes. The tagline was: "Keds. Worn by level-headed Christians."

=== Other film and video work ===
Ryno was a producer on New York at the Movies for A&E. A documentary hosted by Meryl Streep that included over 14 film legends (including: Martin Scorsese, Sidney Lumet, Spike Lee, Nora Ephron, Edward Burns, and John Turturro) giving their real-life experiences of making movies in New York City. With the tagline of "You can't fake New York".

Ryno also produced Coney Island Baby, an award-winning romantic comedy that takes place in Sligo, Ireland and made its premiere television broadcast on the Sundance Channel. It was direct by Amy Hobby who won best first time director for the film.

Throughout those years, she also worked freelance with the ESPY's, the American Music Awards, and several commercial productions including Levi Strauss & Co., American Express, Toys R Us, microsoft, and Lincoln. She produced and directed a segment of a behind-the-music piece for a collaboration between Xbox 360 and 343 Industries featuring Soulja Boy, Xzibit, DJ Skee, Prodigy from Mobb Deep, and T-Boz aka Tionne Watkins all discussing the special relationship between music and video games while featuring the newest Halo franchise to be released that year, Halo4.

For Funny or Die Tanya, produced, co-wrote and co-directed with Motion Family the comedy film short "Big Tweet" featuring, Brandon T Jackson, Sydney Tamiia Poitier, DJ Skee and Jason Beghe.

She produced a couple music videos worth noting, in 2011 Tanya produced and directed a raw indie style music video for blues dynamo Gina Sicilia's hit "Addicted" and in 2012 she produced "Rap'n'Rolla" for the popular Russian Rap Artist, Alexander Stepanov, aka ST, directed by Motion Family.

Ryno also ventured into publishing and created the New Jersey Production Guide, claiming to be the first comprehensive resource for film production, commercial productions, and television production in the state of New Jersey. She published this 200 page guide in both 1998 and 2000.

=== Iron House Design ===
In 2010, Iron House Design, teaming up with her husband, Tanya launched the first dedicated luxury home gym design firm. She established the company as a specialized studio bridging the gap between traditional interior design and home gym design. Ryno built the firm around the idea that a gym should be designed—not simply filled with equipment—integrating layout, flow, lighting, acoustics, and materials into a cohesive experience. Over time, Iron House Design expanded into longevity and wellness-focused spaces, incorporating recovery and regeneration elements such as saunas, cold plunge areas, massage and bodywork zones, and meditation or breathwork rooms. The firm has been featured in major design media, including Architectural Digest, which described Iron House Design as specializing in Architectural Digest, “creating wellness-oriented rooms and choosing the perfect fitness equipment so your home can give Equinox a run for its money,” noting that “a tailored, chic space for exercising is quickly becoming a more common commodity.”

== Selected filmography ==
- Coney Island Baby (2003) is a comedy-drama in which Ryno made her producing debut for a feature-length film.

Also see:

- List of Saturday TV Funhouse segments
- List of Saturday Night Live commercial parodies
- NYWIFT

== Awards ==
Year	Result	Award	Category	Nominated work
2011	Won	Inspiring Filmmaker Award	Detroit Trinity Film Festival	Big Tweet
2005	Won	Best First Time Director	Newport Int. Film Festival	Coney Island Baby
1998	Nom	Annie Award	International Animated Film Association	Titey - TV Funhouse

== Publications ==
- Beyond the Ocean Waves 2021 ISBN 9798533038539 Based on a true story, Tanya's real life is included in this "truth is stranger than fiction" memoir written by her good friend T. Edwards Brown.
