= Sedelmaier =

Sedelmaier is a surname. Notable people with the surname include:

- J. J. Sedelmaier (born 1956), American animator, illustrator, designer, author and film director/producer
- Joe Sedelmaier (1933–2026), American film director
