= List of Saturday TV Funhouse segments =

This article lists the different episodes of TV Funhouse.

== SNL's TV Funhouse episodes ==
The series was primarily produced in association with J.J. Sedelmaier Productions from seasons 22 to 24, and Wachtenheim/Marianetti Animation from season 25 onward.

#	Air date	SNL episode	Recurring series	Episode title	Notes
1	September 28, 1996	Tom Hanks and Tom Petty & the Heartbreakers episode	The Ambiguously Gay Duo	"It Takes Two to Tango"	Ace and Gary, a pair of Superman-esque superheroes whose superpowers and friendship is too close to be considered non-sexual, foil Bighead's plan to take over Metroville.
2	October 5, 1996	Lisa Kudrow and Sheryl Crow episode	Fun with Real Audio	"Ross Perot & Larry King Ramble"	
3	October 19, 1996	Bill Pullman and New Edition episode	Fun with Real Audio	"Bill Clinton and Bob Dole"	
4	November 2, 1996	Chris Rock and The Wallflowers episode	The Ambiguously Gay Duo	"Queen of Terror"	Ace and Gary head to the planetoid Grassis to stop the evil scheme of Bighead and Queen Serena (voiced by Ana Gasteyer).
5	November 16, 1996	Robert Downey Jr. and Fiona Apple episode	Fun with Real Audio	"O. J. Simpson Trial"	
6	November 23, 1996	Phil Hartman and Bush episode	The Michael Jackson Show		The first of three sketches featuring Michael Jackson. This episode has him, Bubbles the Chimpanzee, and the reanimated bones of Joseph Merrick holding a press conference to promote Camp Michael.
7	December 14, 1996	Rosie O'Donnell and Whitney Houston episode	The Ambiguously Gay Duo	"Don We Now or Never"	Ace and Gary have to save Santa Claus (voiced by Robert Smigel) and his reindeer from the beetles (also voiced by Robert Smigel) of the planet Zolaro.
8	January 11, 1997	Kevin Spacey and Beck episode	The X-Presidents	"North Korea"	North Korea allies with aliens to conquer the world. Featuring the voice of Stephen Colbert as a Guard.
9	January 18, 1997	David Alan Grier and Snoop Dogg episode	Short Film	"Wheaty, the Wheaten Terrier"	Featuring the voices of Laura Tietjen as Mom, Stephen Colbert as Dad, John Randolph Jones, Tyler Jones, Andy Newburg, and Brooks Roger.
10	February 8, 1997	Neve Campbell and David Bowie episode	Fun with Real Audio	"State of the Union"	As Bill Clinton gives his speech, Ross Perot escapes from a mental hospital on a giant rabbit (voiced by J. J. Sedelmaier).
11	February 22, 1997	Alec Baldwin and Tina Turner episode	Fun with Real Audio		Tom Snyder stalks Dolly Parton.
12	April 12, 1997	Rob Lowe and Spice Girls episode	The X-Presidents	"Brazilian Environmental Summit"	Vice President Al Gore is kidnapped by aliens posing as trees. Facing defeat, the X-Presidents use their powers to revive Richard Nixon and Checkers the Dog to help save the day. Featuring the voices of Bill Chott, Stephen Colbert, and Robert Smigel.
13	April 19, 1997	Pamela Anderson and Rollins Band episode	The Ambiguously Gay Duo	"Safety Tips"	Ace and Gary demonstrate bicycle and home safety tips for local kids.
14	May 17, 1997	Jeff Goldblum and En Vogue episode	Fun with Real Audio	"Sally Jessy Raphael"	
15	September 27, 1997	Sylvester Stallone and Jamiroquai episode	Fun with Real Audio	"Casablanca Outtakes"	
16	November 8, 1997	Jon Lovitz and Jane's Addiction episode	Fun with Real Audio	"Clinton Press Conference"	
17	November 15, 1997	Claire Danes and Mariah Carey episode	The Ambiguously Gay Duo	"Blow Hot, Blow Cold"	Bighead and Dr. Brainio create an ice monster as part of a plot to freeze the Earth.
18	December 13, 1997	Helen Hunt and Hanson episode	Fun with Real Audio		Jesus tries to fix everything that's wrong with today's commercialized Christmas.
19	January 10, 1998	Samuel L. Jackson and Ben Folds Five episode		"George Clooney in The Sexiest Car Alive"	George Clooney fights off the paparazzi in a parody of Speed Racer. Featuring the voices of Stephen Colbert, Ana Gasteyer, Darrell Hammond, Cheri Oteri, and Robert Smigel.
20	February 7, 1998	John Goodman and Paula Cole episode	The X-Presidents	"X-First Ladies"	When Boris Yeltsin and his nuclear-powered aliens threaten the world with their communism, the X-Presidents spring into action and eventually receive help from their X-First Ladies. Featuring the voices of Ana Gasteyer as Hillary Clinton and Betty Ford, Paula Pell as Nancy Reagan, and Robert Smigel.
21	February 14, 1998	Roma Downey and Missy Elliott episode		"Ah Lin the Skater Man"	Chinese speed-skater Ah Lin gets help from Ben Johnson. Featuring the voices of Barney Cheng, Robert Lin, and Ben Wang.
22	February 28, 1998	Garth Brooks episode	Fun with Real Audio	"Interviewing David Brenner"	
23	March 14, 1998	Julianne Moore and Backstreet Boys episode		"Conspiracy Theory Rock!"	Schoolhouse Rock! parody about how companies allegedly control the media as sung by a crazy homeless man (voiced by Frank Simms). It only aired once and was pulled from reruns due to complaints about content, though Lorne Michaels has said that it was pulled because he didn't find it funny. It is available on Internet video sites and as a special feature on the DVD version of the Saturday Night Live best-of special "The Best of TV Funhouse."
24	April 4, 1998	Steve Buscemi and Third Eye Blind episode		"Titey"	Disney reveals the trailer to its cheerful spin on the Titanic in light of the success of the 1997 film and Titanic: The Musical. Featuring the voices of Jason Alexander as Titey, Whoopi Goldberg as the Iceberg, Gilbert Gottfried as Napoleon Bonaparte, Molly Ringwald as Anne Frank, Brian Cummings as the trailer announcer (uncredited), and Robert Smigel as the Captain and the Chef (uncredited).
25	May 9, 1998	Dave Duchovny, Puff Daddy and Jimmy Page episode	The Ambiguously Gay Duo	"A Hard One to Swallow"	After defeating Bighead and Dr. Brainio's ice monster, Ace and Gary retreat to their Fortress of Privacy to consult Kijoro about why people are always looking at them funny. Meanwhile, Bighead, Dr. Brainio, Queen Serena, a beetle from Zolaro, and some other villains debate if Ace and Gary are gay.
26	September 26, 1998	Cameron Diaz and The Smashing Pumpkins episode	Fun with Real Audio	"Presidential Address Outtakes"	Bill Clinton does his apologies about what happened during his testimony before the Independent Counsel and the Grand Jury. Various mishaps occur during the filming of his apology.
27	October 17, 1998	Lucy Lawless and Elliott Smith episode	Fun with Real Audio		Howard Stern interrupts a Spartan Cheerleaders sketch to berate Saturday Night Live's decline in quality and Lorne Michaels keeping the show on the air to make money off it. Lorne teams up with Stern to create Saturday Howard Night Live Stern after shooting him.
28	October 24, 1998	Ben Stiller and Alanis Morissette episode		"Hete-Roy"	A Biblical superhero named Hete-Roy (voiced by Robert Smigel) uses the power of Christianity to turn homosexual men straight. Featuring the voices of Andrew Daly and Carey Prusa.
29	November 21, 1998	Jennifer Love Hewitt and Beastie Boys episode	The Ambiguously Gay Duo	"Ace and Gary's Fan Club"	Ace and Gary answer fan mail that asks obvious questions about their homosexuality. Featuring the voices of Bill Chott and Robert Smigel.
30	December 12, 1998	Alec Baldwin, Luciano Pavarotti, Vanessa Williams, and Philadelphia Boys Choir & Chorale	Lost Cartoon Flashback	"The Harlem Globetrotters First Christmas"	The Harlem Globetrotters celebrate their first Christmas where they go back in time to the birth of Jesus. Featuring the voices of Andrew Daly as Saint Joseph, Tyrone Finch as Meadowlark Lemon, Ana Gasteyer as Mary, Tim Meadows as Curly Neal, Tracy Morgan as Hubert "Geese" Ausbie, and Robert Smigel. Note: This episode was re-aired on the "Christmas Day" episode of Comedy Central's TV Funhouse.
31	February 6, 1999	Gwyneth Paltrow and Barenaked Ladies episode	The X-Presidents	"Constitution"	The X-Presidents save the day from the Constitution when it comes to life to attack Congress. Featuring the voices of Bill Chott and Robert Smigel.
32	February 13, 1999	Brendan Fraser, Busta Rhymes, and The Roots episode	Fun with Real Audio	"The Poetry of Jewel"	Jewel recites her poetry while the background characters and setting mock it.
33	March 20, 1999	Drew Barrymore and Garbage episode	Fun with Real Audio	"Oscar Highlights"	
34	May 8, 1999	Cuba Gooding Jr. and Ricky Martin episode	The Ambiguously Gay Duo	"AmbiguoBoys"	Even before they were the Ambiguously Gay Duo, teenagers Ace and Gary fought evil. This episode shows that Bighead was in their class and he is determined to win his classmates' respect and "out" the duo. When he reanimates and enlarges a giant frog, the AmbiguoBoys must stop him. Featuring the voices of Drew Barrymore as Lila and Robert Smigel as the Coach
35	May 15, 1999	Sarah Michelle Gellar and Backstreet Boys episode	Unsold Cartoon Pilot Shack	"The Ginsburg Gang"	The Ginsburg Gang investigates a haunted house. Featuring the voices of Beth Cahill, Stephen Colbert, Ana Gasteyer, Brian Reich, Molly Shannon, and Robert Smigel.
36	September 26, 1999	???		"25th Anniversary Special – Lorne Michaels"	Lorne Michaels relishes being in control of the Saturday Night Live franchise.
37	October 23, 1999	Norm Macdonald, Dr. Dre, Snoop Dogg, and Eminem episode	Fun with Real Audio	"House Judiciary Committee"	
38	December 4, 1999	Christina Ricci and Beck episode	Millennium Fun with Real Audio	"Friends Apocalypse"	
39	December 11, 1999	Danny DeVito and R.E.M. episode	Fun with Real Audio	"1999: The Year in Journalism"	
40	February 19, 2000	Ben Affleck and Fiona Apple episode	The All-New Adventures of Mr. T	"A Doll's House"	Mr. T tries to find work in a theatrical play called "A Doll's House." Featuring the voices of Andrew Daly and Ana Gasteyer as Actress.
41	April 15, 2000	Tobey Maguire and Sisqó	Fun with Real Audio	"Up Close with Geppetto"	Geppetto (voiced by Robert Smigel) interviews Sharon Stone while a horny Pinocchio ogles.
42	May 6, 2000	John Goodman and Neil Young episode		"The Life of a Catch Phrase"	Lorne Michaels (voiced by Robert Smigel) answers viewer mail and shows how Jon Lovitz's "Yeah, that's the ticket" catchphrase became popular and fell out of favor in exchange for Dana Carvey's "Well, isn't that special?"
43	May 13, 2000	Britney Spears episode	The Ambiguously Gay Duo	"Trouble Coming Twice"	Ace and Gary work to foil Bighead's plot to attack the NBA Championship. Featuring the voices of Darrell Hammond as Bob Costas and Tracy Morgan as Shaquille O'Neal.
44	May 20, 2000	Jackie Chan and Kid Rock episode	Fun with Some Real Audio	"Madonna"	Madonna films the video for her version of "American Pie." Featuring the voices of Ana Gasteyer as Madonna and Woman and Robert Smigel as Don McLean and Fan
45	October 14, 2000	Kate Hudson and Radiohead episode	The X-Presidents	"Independents"	The X-Presidents team up to prevent third-party candidates Ralph Nader and Pat Buchanan from affecting the presidential election. To make sure they succeed, Ralph Nader and Pat Buchanan are using Jimmy Carter's daughter Amy, Ronald Reagan's son Ronald Reagan Jr. (voiced by Chris Parnell), and Gerald Ford's dog Liberty as decoys.
46	November 4, 2000	Charlize Theron and Paul Simon episode	The All New Adventures of Mr. T	"Actors Strike"	Mr. T continues his search for an acting gig and lands one for a tampon commercial in the midst of an actor's strike. Featuring the voices of Andrew Daly, Ana Gasteyer, and Robert Smigel as Michael Gross.
47	November 18, 2000	Tom Green and David Gray	Fun with Real Audio	"Sex and the Country"	An episode of the HBO women's comedy Sex and the City showing men having sex with farm animals. Was originally supposed to air on the episode hosted by Charlize Theron, but was almost banned due to indecent content. The sketch has since been removed from most reruns.
48	January 20, 2001	Mena Suvari and Lenny Kravitz episode	The X-Presidents	"Clinton Joins The Group"	After leaving office, Bill Clinton attempts to join the group despite not having superpowers. Featuring the voice of Robert Smigel as Al Gore. Produced by Tape House Toons.
49	February 10, 2001	Jennifer Lopez episode		"Ray of Light"	Ray Lewis sings in many Disney films and he runs away in a limo whenever a Disney character is killed like Mufasa's death and Beast getting stabbed. One musical number he does is called "I Did Not Kill No Motherf****** Lion". Brian Cummings provides the trailer narration with the voices of Tyrone Finch and Robert Smigel.
50	February 24, 2001	Katie Holmes and Dave Matthews Band episode		"Backstreet Boys"	Boy band superheroes who fail at everything to save the day. Featuring the voices of Doug Dale, T.R. Knight, Jeff McCarthy, Jason Mobbs, Sean Modica, Chris Phillips, Robert Smigel, Lark Speis, Jason Yudolph, and Gary Yudman. Produced by Tape House Toons.
51	March 10, 2001	Conan O'Brien and Don Henley episode	Short Film	"Find the Black People at the Knick Game"	A live-action video version of Where's Waldo?
52	April 14, 2001	Renée Zellweger, Eve, and Gwen Stefani episode	Fun with Real Audio	"Bryant Gumbel Interviews Survivor Cast"	Feeling that his career has hit a new low, Gumbel makes several attempts to commit suicide during the interview, but aides quickly rescue/revive him. Thus, Gumbel never misses a beat. Produced by Tape House Toons.
53	May 19, 2001	Christopher Walken and Weezer episode	The Anatominals Show	"Kogi Bear"	While watching "The Anatominals Show" that has Kogi Bear, Pook Bear, Mindy Bear, and Sheila Coyote getting criticized of their choice of clothing by the park ranger while on the picnic grounds, Lorne Michaels (voiced by Robert Smigel) worries about SNL's quality declining and begs the Devil to get out of being executive producer of the show. The Devil puts Lorne in a position of a Peace Corps until he gets bored and returns to SNL. Featuring the voice of Doug Dale and Carol Lee Shahid.
54	October 13, 2001	Drew Barrymore and Macy Gray episode	Fun with Real Audio	"NBC Fall Retooling Preview"	Emeril Lagasse's sitcom is retooled for better ratings.
55	November 10, 2001	Gwyneth Paltrow and Ryan Adams episode	The Michael Jackson Show		Michael Jackson tries to prove to his weird entourage that he's not a pedophile anymore as he goes to the store with Bubbles, an aged Emmanuel Lewis, the bones of Joseph Merrick, Llama, a zebra with a pushmi-pullyu design, the arm of Elizabeth Taylor, and a sentient urn containing Marilyn Monroe's ashes. Seen on the east coast and when it premiered. Featuring the voices of Doug Dale, Charles Rembert, and Robert Smigel.
56	November 10, 2001	Gwyneth Paltrow and Ryan Adams episode		"The 700 Club"	Pat Robertson introduces a cartoon called "Harry the Embryonic Cell". The 700 Club goes on hiatus and returns to The Family Channel's cartoons starting with "Britney Toons", a cartoon starring Britney Spears. Featuring the voices of Robert Smigel, Doug Dale, Kevin Dorff, Maya Rudolph, and Samantha Scharff. Only seen on West Coast airings and in the 90-minute NBC reruns.
57	December 15, 2001	Ellen DeGeneres and No Doubt episode		"The Narrator Who Ruined Christmas"	Sam the Snowman from Rudolph the Red-Nosed Reindeer gives up on Christmas due to the 9/11 terrorist attacks and the anthrax scares. Featuring the voices of Erik Bergmann as Santa Claus, Doug Dale, Chris Parnell as Tom Brokaw, Amy Poehler, Maya Rudolph, and Robert Smigel. Animated by Curious Pictures.
58	January 12, 2002	Josh Hartnett and Pink episode	The X-Presidents	"Hunt for Osama"	The X-Presidents and Bill Clinton head to Afghanistan to look for Osama bin Laden and run into trouble with the Al-Qaeda soldiers (voiced by Wael Haggiagi). The Ambiguously Gay Duo make a cameo appearance in this cartoon helping to apprehend Osama bin Laden. Featuring the voice of Robert Smigel as Bob Dole.
59	March 9, 2002	Jon Stewart and India.Arie episode	Fun with Real Audio	"Colin Powell on MTV"	Colin Powell is interviewed by teenagers on an MTV roundtable show and starts suffering from hallucinations. Mike Judge provides the voices for Beavis and Butt-head while Kurt Loder voices himself.
60	March 16, 2002	Ian McKellen and Kylie Minogue episode	Fun with Real Audio	"Oscars' Greatest Moments"	Björk's swan dress comes alive and attacks everyone at the ceremony while Winona Ryder steals Julia Roberts' Best Actress Oscar.
61	April 20, 2002	Alec Baldwin and P.O.D. episode	The Anatominals Show	Kogi Bear's Picnic	Lorne Michaels (voiced by Robert Smigel) tries to keep senators Hillary Clinton (voiced by Ana Gasteyer) and Daniel Patrick Moynihan visiting Studio 8-H from watching the latest installment of The Anatominals where Kogi Bear and his friends partake in Kogi's latest plot to obtain a picnic basket. Featuring the voices of Doug Dale and Carol Lee Shahid.
62	May 11, 2002	Kirsten Dunst and Eminem episode		Bambi 2002	The film Bambi is about to go into the Disney Vault; this is followed by advertisements for Return to Never Land, Cinderella II: Dreams Come True, Lady and the Tramp II: Scamp's Adventure, and the unaffiliated Pokahotass, a pornographic parody of Pocahontas. Bambi's mother (voiced by Amy Poehler) turns up alive as Bambi (also voiced by Amy Poehler), his mother, and Thumper (voiced by David Spade) fight hunters and terrorists while using fighting skills in the style of The Matrix. There are also some hilarious outtakes, an appearance by Jared Fogle (voiced by himself), and an appearance by the New York Yankees. Brian Cummings provides the trailer narration.
63	October 5, 2002	Matt Damon and Bruce Springsteen & E Street Band		"The Smurfette Show"	E! Entertainment channel features a new cartoon with Smurfette as an overweight, ditzy, fading Playboy model and celebrity trainwreck (much like Anna Nicole Smith). Featuring the voices of Amy Poehler as Smurfette and Low Self-Esteemy Smurf, Jim Cummings as Gargamel, Doug Dale, Seth Meyers, and Robert Smigel.
64	October 19, 2002	John McCain and The White Stripes episode	The Ambiguously Gay Duo	"The Third Leg of Justice"	Using the ice monster as bait, Bighead redecorates his lair as part of his next plot against Ace and Gary. General Electric chairman and superhero Jack Welch aids Ace and Gary.
65	November 16, 2002	Brittany Murphy and Nelly episode		"The Religetables"	A VeggieTales parody showing the atrocities, violence, and scandals committed by religious figures or in the name of religion, including witch trials, child molestation scandals, and The Crusades. Featuring the voices of Doug Dale, Maya Rudolph, and Robert Smigel.
66	December 14, 2002	Al Gore and Phish episode		Charlie Brown Christmas	The Peanuts gang discover that they can change reality by waving their arms around after fixing Charlie Brown's Christmas tree. Featuring the voices of Maya Rudolph as Charlie Brown, Amy Poehler as Linus van Pelt, Kate Flannery, Chris Parnell as Tom Brokaw, and Brad Pitt as himself.
67	March 8, 2003	Queen Latifah and Ms. Dynamite episode	The X-Presidents	"Iraq 2003"	The X-Presidents make a film about Iraq after reviewing the pro-war videos featuring Bugs Bunny (based on a real life World War II cartoon called Bugs Bunny Nips the Nips) and Grape Ape in a pro-war video that promoted the Invasion of Grenada. When the X-Presidents give SpongeBob SquarePants a hard time when it comes to the United States invasion of Afghanistan, The Powerpuff Girls show up to rescue him only to be beaten up badly by the X-Presidents. While noting that the incident caused a PR nightmare and his dad mentioned calling Oliver North who is willing to take the blame, George W. Bush stated that the Pentagon doctored the footage to make it look like the Powerpuff Girls were cast as invading Arabs. Featuring the voices of Tom Kenny as SpongeBob SquarePants, Jeff Bergman as Bugs Bunny and Grape Ape, Amy Poehler as Blossom, and Robert Smigel.
68	March 15, 2003	Salma Hayek and Christina Aguilera episode		"Are You Hot?"	Lorenzo Lamas (voiced by himself) rates cartoon characters ranging from Betty Boop to Popeye, Cinderella, Olive Oyl, Strawberry Shortcake, Droopy, Marvin the Martian, Dagwood Bumstead, Optimus Prime, and Yosemite Sam on their sex appeal. When he criticizes Barney Rubble, he ends up attacked by Bamm-Bamm Rubble. This was used as the cold opening for Saturday Night Live: The Best of TV Funhouse with new footage of Barney Rubble opening the show with "Live from New York, It's Saturday Night!" Featuring the voices of Doug Dale, Chris Parnell, and Robert Smigel.
69	May 10, 2003	Adrien Brody, Sean Paul, and Wayne Wonder episode		"Saddam and Osama"	An '80s G.I. Joe-style cartoon about Iraqi dictator and war criminal Saddam Hussein and al-Qaeda terrorist leader Osama bin Laden tricking American troops. Also includes a live action commercial for rocks and a trailer for an anti-Semitic Arabic dub of the 1960s Batman cartoon. Featuring the voices of Wael Haggiagi, Nasry Malik, Saudaa Robinson, and Robert Smigel.
70	May 17, 2003	Dan Aykroyd and Beyoncé		"Cokee, the Most Expensive Dog in the World"	Ben Affleck buys a Robert Duvall look-a-like dog named Cokee for Jennifer Lopez (voiced by Amy Poehler). Then Ben has trouble making the dog speak like Duvall. After a dog trainer he enlists causes Cokee to speak like James Woods, Ben tries to get the real Robert Duvall into portraying the dog until Ben attacks him for asking if he can sniff Jennifer's butt as Jennifer works to break up the altercation. Featuring the voices of Elon Gold, Darrell Hammond, and Robert Smigel.
71	October 4, 2003	Jack Black and John Mayer		"Yankee Super-Heroes"	A cartoon about the Yankees having a double life as superheroes where they defend Earth from some aliens. Featuring the voices of Chris Parnell and Robert Smigel.
72	December 13, 2003	Elijah Wood and Jet episode	Fun With Real Audio	"George W. Bush"	
73	February 21, 2004	Christina Aguilera and Maroon 5 episode	Fun with Real Audio	"Access Hollywood"	
74	March 6, 2004	Colin Firth and Norah Jones episode		"Cartoons and Your Government"	Michael Powell shows clips of classic cartoons (from Disney, Warner Bros., and Hanna-Barbera) that have been censored under new FCC regulations like the changes to Donald Duck, Bugs Bunny, The Flintstones, Tweety, The Adventures of Batman, Josie and the Pussycats, and Bambi. The cartoon ends like the famous Warner Bros. cartoon Duck Amuck where Howard Stern is the mischievous cartoonist who messes with Powell (giving him a naked body with no explicit genitals shown), snickering and saying Bugs Bunny's catch phrase "Ain't I a stinker?" Featuring the voices of Robert Smigel and Elon Gold.
75	March 13, 2004	Ben Affleck and N*E*R*D episode		"The Making of The Passion of the Dumpty"	Produced by J.J. Sedelmaier Productions.
76	May 8, 2004	Snoop Dogg and Avril Lavigne episode		"Pothead Theater"	Live-action/animated short where real-life stoners request cartoons like dogs walking people, fish fishing for people, ketchup getting people out of the bottle, the environment exploiting people, TVs watching people.
77	October 9, 2004	Queen Latifah episode	The X-Presidents	"Election Meddling"	
78	October 30, 2004	Kate Winslet and Eminem episode	Fun with Real Audio	"John McCain"	John McCain suffers from a war flashback while trying to praise George W. Bush during a speech.
79	November 20, 2004	Luke Wilson and U2 episode		"The Homocranial Mind Mixer"	George W. Bush (voiced by Jim Morris) creates a machine that swaps the minds of homosexual celebrities making them heterosexual ranging from Rosie O'Donnell to Richard Simmons, Ellen DeGeneres, and Ryan Seacrest. Featuring the voice of Meryl Pam Cooper, Ricky Roxburgh, Marge Royce, Armand Schultz, Robert Smigel, and Oliver Vaquer.
80	December 18, 2004	Robert De Niro and Destiny's Child episode		"Blue Christmas"	Santa Claus (voiced by Robert Smigel) skips the states that re-elected George W. Bush and hangs out with liberal celebrities like Margaret Cho, Al Franken, and Moby. Featuring the voice of Erik Bergmann. Animated by Bent Image Lab.
81	April 9, 2005	Cameron Diaz and Green Day episode	The Michael Jackson Show		A scientist (voiced by Robert Smigel) enlisted by Michael Jackson's lawyer gives Michael Jackson glasses that makes his sham girlfriend Tara Reid (voiced by Amy Poehler) look like Emmanuel Lewis from Webster so that he wouldn't have fun with little boys following an incident near his court case where a woman left her son cooling on the window. When Tara has a wardrobe malfunction in bed, Michael starts to have a reaction causing Bubbles, the bones of Joseph Merrick, and Llama to evacuate Tara and bring in the aged Emmanuel Lewis from the nearby break glass container who Michael sees as a three-headed version of himself. As Michael enjoys his time with him on his back, Emmanuel claims that the glasses he was given makes him see Michael as a hot lady. Michael's lawyer states that he doesn't have the heart to tell Emmanuel that those are regular glasses as the bones of Joseph Merrick quotes "Ouch"! Featuring the voices of Doug Dale, Rob Riggle as an MSNBC Reporter, and Saudaa Robinson.
82	April 16, 2005	Tom Brady and Beck episode	Short Film	"Sexual Harassment and You"	A live-action educational film showing how handsome men (like host Tom Brady) don't get in trouble for sexual harassment in the workplace while average men like Fred Armisen do get in trouble for harassment, even if they don't intentionally set out to do it. Produced by J.J. Sedelmaier Productions.
83	May 14, 2005	Will Ferrell and Queens of the Stone Age episode		"Shazzang"	A parody of the forgotten Hanna-Barbera cartoon Shazzan where children summon a giant, all-powerful genie to easily defeat their enemies, but Shazzang starts to go overboard and sadistically tortures the villains. Featuring the voices of Robert Smigel, Erik Bergmann, Michelle Blakely, Brian Kennedy, Chris Phillips, and Dino Stamatopolous.
84	May 21, 2005	Lindsay Lohan and Coldplay episode		"Divertor"	A superhero called Divertor helps the President divert attention away from political crises by creating celebrity scandals for people to worry about like Sinbad having a wardrobe malfunction while talking to some elementary school kids, Jenna Elfman having slaves on her property, and Mike Tyson (voiced by Kenan Thompson) eating a Golden Retriever. After being thanked by President, Divertor admitted that he never used his abilities on Mike Tyson. Featuring the voices of Robert Smigel, Paul Christie, Jim Conroy, Darrell Hammond, Sara Krieger, Lisa Lewis, Kerin McCue, Fred Newman, Stephen D. Newman, Amy Poehler, Rob Webb, and Gary Yudman.
85	October 1, 2005	Steve Carell and Kanye West episode	Fun with Real Audio	"John Roberts"	Justice Roberts avoids answering all questions even after this confirmation hearing.
86	December 10, 2005	Alec Baldwin and Shakira episode		"Celebrity Mugshot Poker"	A stop-motion film (in the style of Terry Gilliam's work on Monty Python) where famous mugshots play poker, presented by real life Celebrity Poker Showdown hosts Dave Foley and Phil Gordon (voiced by themselves). Featuring the voices of Robert Smigel, Roy James, and Mike Sweeney.
87	December 17, 2005	Jack Black and Neil Young episode		"Christmastime for the Jews"	A black-and-white stop-motion musical film sung by Darlene Love that shows Jewish people having their own brand of fun on Christmas Eve. Darlene appears live in the studio singing with the band as SNL goes to commercial. Animated by Bix Pix Entertainment.
88	January 14, 2006	Scarlett Johansson and Death Cab for Cutie episode		"Darwin"	A cartoon sponsored by a religious network that stars Charles Darwin (voiced by Robert Smigel). This is the first (and, so far, only) time that an episode of Saturday Night Live has opened with an animated sketch.
89	March 4, 2006	Natalie Portman and Fall Out Boy episode		"Belated Black History Moments"	Dennis Haysbert appears LIVE in front of the studio audience and shows three failed cartoon series featuring black characters: Token Power (which features Winston Zeddemore, Franklin from the Peanuts comic strip, and Valerie from Josie and the Pussycats as detectives), The Hoke and Daisy Show (featuring the stars of "Driving Miss Daisy" going on various adventures), and Ladysmith Black Mambazo in Outer Space (which entails the singing group dashing around and deeply intoning "Oh, no" as they are chased by robots and aliens). Featuring the voices of Robert Smigel, Paul Christie, Chad Everett, Kalif Jenkins, and Tracy Morgan.
90	April 15, 2006	Lindsay Lohan and Pearl Jam episode		"Journey to the Disney Vault"	In a satire of The Walt Disney Company's habit of making and quickly shelving direct-to-video sequels to their animated feature films (some of which are taken to extremes like a sixth Hunchback of Notre Dame film and an eighth Mulan film), two children (voiced by Megan Gallagher and Thomas Sharkey) worry that Bambi II alongside many other films will be going into the Disney Vault, but they get their wish to visit the Disney Vault when Mickey Mouse (voiced by Michael Ziegfeld) appears as the trailer for "Journey to the Disney Vault" begins. While exploring the vault, the two children discover the dark side of the company, including: Walt Disney and Vivien Leigh's cryogenically frozen heads; Mickey comments that Disney wanted to be resurrected in the future as a cyborg married to Leigh, also as a cyborg.; A HUAC booklet where Disney ratted out some animators on suspicion of being communists. Mickey explains that they were labor union rousers and had to leave while sadly commenting about the rumors that Disney was anti-Semitic.; The "very original" version of Song of the South that "[Disney] only played at parties", in which Uncle Remus insults his own race to the tune of "Zip-a-Dee-Doo-Dah."; Blueprints for "Disney's America Civil War Land" theme park containing attractions like Uncle Mickey's Cabin, Donald's Slave Auction, and Goofy's Triage.; Jim Henson, having survived into old age, bound and gagged in a chair with a Kermit the Frog puppet next to him; Mickey breaks down and tearfully explains this was the result of the broken deal between The Jim Henson Company and The Walt Disney Company circa 1990, when Henson died in real life.; Scar (voiced by Chris Parnell) from The Lion King appears as the Disney Lawyer who condemns the children to the Disney Vault for knowing too much, but does allow them to see The Lion King 5 2/3: Simba Sits in for Meredith. Jeff Bottoms provided the trailer narration.
91	May 20, 2006	Kevin Spacey and Nelly Furtado episode	Fun with Real Audio	"Presidential Outtakes"	Features various famous moments in George W. Bush's presidency and everyone from people to animals to levees spitting out food and water in reaction to the ridiculous claims.
92	October 28, 2006	Hugh Laurie and Beck episode		"Republican Attack Ads"	George W. Bush (voiced by Jim Morris) unveils new attack ads against Democrats: one depicts Ted Kennedy as Count Dracula claiming that he wants to "cut and run", then French kisses Osama bin Laden. Barack Obama comes in dressed as Count von Count from Sesame Street counting "one gay marriage, two gay marriages...". The other depicts a pregnant woman giving candy to trick-or-treaters until Hillary Clinton (dressed as a witch) pops out of the pregnant woman's stomach and offers the kids condoms and abortion pills, then French kisses the pregnant woman. Featuring the voices of Robert Smigel.
93	November 11, 2006	Alec Baldwin and Christina Aguilera episode		"Kobayashi"	A Dragon Ball Z parody featuring hot dog eating champion Takeru Kobayashi. Featuring the voices of Yoshi Amao, Ken Kasai, Sakura Sugihai, and Kimmy Suzuki.
94	December 9, 2006	Annette Bening, Gwen Stefani, and Akon episode		"Diddy Kiddies"	
95	January 20, 2007	Jeremy Piven and AFI episode	Fun With Real Audio & Stuff	"Frontline: 2007 Year in Review"	New, bizarre ways to liven up TV news programs are exhibited, such as "chipmunknification" and farting in a shallow pool.
96	March 24, 2007	Peyton Manning and Carrie Underwood episode		"Maraka"	In a parody of Dora the Explorer, a young Latin girl named Maraka and her cat Mittens (both voiced by Becca Lish) journey to Penguin Island and help a mother penguin rescue her egg. As the two travel, Maraka starts speaking in a wide variety of languages; acts bossy towards and curses at the audience; and asks non-sequitur questions about making change from a $50 bill, checking for a hernia, Robert Blake's innocence, the gender of a person in a photograph, the abandonment of her father, and the nature of free will.
97	April 21, 2007	Scarlett Johansson and Björk episode		"Torboto"	A parody of Gigantor airing on Fox News Kids. Because of the Geneva Convention's stance on torturing prisoners, Dick Cheney and George W. Bush build a robot that tortures prisoners at Guantánamo Bay, but soon feels sorry for his actions and attacks Cheney. When Torboto appears on 60 Seconds where he was interviewed about his court martial for attacking his superiors who were absolved, Torboto displays the text "That is correct". He then displays the word "Emotion" when asked about how the tortures went. A scene from the next episode shows how Torboto rescues a cat. Featuring the voices of Steve Dikkers, Peter Newman, Robert Smigel, and Gary Yudman.
98	May 12, 2007	Molly Shannon and Linkin Park episode		"Tales From The Greatest Generation"	The genius of Albert Einstein (voiced by Robert Smigel) is overshadowed by his ample breasts. He teams up with Winston Churchill (voiced by Brian Stack) and Lassie (who also have big breasts) and rob banks.
99	May 19, 2007	Zach Braff and Maroon 5 episode		"Decision '08: Spring Cleaning '07"	Oprah Winfrey (voiced by Maya Rudolph) interviews the candidates for United States President in 2008, where they reveal many strange secrets. Featuring the voices of Robert Smigel as Rudy Giuliani and John McCain, Jason Culp, Jorma Taccone as Rufus the Dog, Hasani Issa, Sara Krieger, Jim Morris, and Marc Thompson.
100	September 29, 2007	LeBron James and Kanye West episode	The Ambiguously Gay Duo	"First Served, First Come"	Bighead enlists Police Sergeant Karznia (voiced by Robert Smigel) of the Minneapolis St. Paul Airport's Undercover Police to out Ace and Gary at his "bury the hatchet" BBQ where Bighead has Dr. Brainio, Orbitrox, the beetles from Zolaro (one voiced by Robert Smigel), Flame Eye (voiced by Bill Hader), Lizardo (voiced by Robert Smigel), Half-Scary (voiced by Robert Smigel), and Flatside (voiced by Bill Hader). Bighead's attempts to get Ace and Gary to eat Mexican and spicy Indian foods enough for them to go do gay-related activities in the double outhouse ends up backfiring when everyone else has to go only to find that Sergeant Karznia has engaged in a strange activity with Lizardo.
101	March 1, 2008	Elliot Page and Wilco episode		"The Obama Files"	Barack Obama (voiced by Hisani Issa) sends Jesse Jackson (voiced by Darrell Hammond) and Al Sharpton (voiced by Robert Smigel) on wild goose hunts (to nonexistent countries such as Bophuthatswana, East Paraguay, and Lower Zambuta) to keep them from helping him.
102	May 14, 2011	Ed Helms and Paul Simon episode	The Ambiguously Gay Duo	"The Dark, Clenched Hole of Evil"	Bighead and Dr. Brainio devise a way so that nobody would be safe from their carnivorous Cyber-Eel. When Ace and Gary arrive upon Bighead, Dr. Brainio, a beetle from Zolaro, Half-Scary (voiced by Robert Smigel) and Lizardo (voiced by Robert Smigel) hacking into their credit card accounts, Half-Scary blast Ace and Gary with a flesh ray, transforming them from animated characters to live-action ones, respectively as a way so that the gun malfunctions and "unanimates" everyone where the Cyber-Eel is a puppet. The live-action cast features Jon Hamm as Ace, Jimmy Fallon as Gary, Ed Helms playing Half-Scary, Fred Armisen as Lizardo, Stephen Colbert as Dr. Brainio, and Steve Carell as Bighead. Produced by J.J. Sedelmaier Productions.

== Specials ==
NBC special	Air date	Description
1	April 29, 2006	NBC aired a "Best Of" special for TV Funhouse. The special lasted a full-length 90-minute SNL episode and was hosted by The Ambiguously Gay Duo (voiced by Steve Carell and Stephen Colbert). The duo interacts with the current SNL cast along with Lorne Michaels and Don Pardo. Also features a cameo by Jimmy Fallon.
