= The Ambiguously Gay Duo =

American animated comedy sketch series

- Genre: Animation
- Created by: Robert Smigel; J. J. Sedelmaier
- Voices of: Stephen Colbert; Steve Carell; Robert Smigel
- Narrated by: Bill Chott
- Country of origin: United States
- Original language: English
- No. of episodes: 12

Production
- Producers: Robert Smigel; J.J. Sedelmaier; Tanya Ryno; Samantha Scharff
- Running time: 3 minutes
- Production companies: J.J. Sedelmaier Productions, Inc.

Original release
- Network: ABC (1996); NBC (1996–2011)
- Release: March 15, 1996 – May 20, 2011

The Ambiguously Gay Duo is an American animated comedy sketch that debuted on The Dana Carvey Show before moving to its permanent home on Saturday Night Live. It is created and produced by Robert Smigel and J. J. Sedelmaier as part of the Saturday TV Funhouse series of sketches. It follows the adventures of Ace and Gary, voiced by Stephen Colbert and Steve Carell, respectively, two superheroes whose sexual orientation is a matter of dispute, and a cavalcade of characters preoccupied with the question. The series lasted from 1996 to 2011.

The series is both a pastiche and a parody of Super Friends, emulating the older series' style. The humor is largely based on innuendo, and on the uncertainty of the main villain Bighead whether his opponents are homosexuals or simply home decoration enthusiasts. The series was inspired by the non-fiction book Seduction of the Innocent (1954) by Fredric Wertham, and its allegations that Batman and his protégé Robin were involved in an implied homosexual relationship.

== Plot ==
The Ambiguously Gay Duo is a parody of the stereotypical comic book superhero duo done in the style of Saturday-morning cartoons like Super Friends. The characters are clad in matching pastel turquoise tights, dark blue domino masks, and bright yellow coordinated gauntlets, boots, and trunks.

The typical episode usually begins with the duo's arch-nemesis Bighead, a criminal mastermind with an abnormally large cranium. Bighead is usually briefing his henchmen on a plot for some grandiose plan for world domination, interrupted by a debate as to whether Ace and Gary (The Ambiguously Gay Duo) are gay. Once the crime is in process, the police commissioner calls on the superheroes to save the day, often engaging in similar debates with the chief of police. Ace and Gary set out to foil the evil plan, but not before calling attention to themselves with outrageous antics and innuendo, and behaving in ways perceived by other characters to be stereotypically homosexual, as in this conversation from the first episode:

Ace [patting Gary on the buttocks]: Good job, friend-of-friends!
Villains/Bystanders [gasps, and ghastly stares]
Ace: What's everybody looking at?
Villains/Bystanders in unison: NOTHING!

Similar gags appear in almost every episode. Episodes not following this general formula have featured Ace and Gary answering fan mail or offering child safety tips. One such episode entails Ace and Gary giving children a ride home in their Duocar and offering home decorating tips, all while blithely making various suggestive gestures and comments.

== Background ==
=== Conception ===
The Ambiguously Gay Duo with Gary mounting Ace in flight

Smigel was an executive producer for The Dana Carvey Show in 1996. They wanted to do cartoons on the show, to differentiate themselves from SNL. Writer Dino Stamatopoulos pitched Smigel a parody of Wallace and Gromit, where it was implied that the dog was giving oral sex to the human. Smigel thought the premise would be "unacceptable" to air on ABC. After the conversation Smigel came up with the idea of using superheroes instead. "Anyway, for some reason, the AGD idea just came to me at the end of that conversation. What if we did two superheroes and everyone suspects they're gay? It was always more about the people obsessed with their sexuality than the heroes themselves." Smigel recalled.

The shorts were intended to satirize suggestions that early Batman comics implied a homosexual relationship between the eponymous title character and his field partner and protégé Robin, a charge most infamously leveled by Fredric Wertham in his 1954 book, Seduction of the Innocent, the research methodology for which was later discredited.

In June 2020, Robert Smigel told The Daily Beast that the engine of the show was an "obsession with sexuality" and that he thought that it was funny because the homophobes and everyone are obsessed with finding out whether the superheroes are gay or not, calling it "sport and titillation." He added that the point of the cartoon was that it doesn't matter whether the superheroes have sex or not and said that since there has been "an incredible amount of progress" since the series premiered, he would not write the cartoon today.

== Characters ==
=== The Ambiguously Gay Duo ===
- Ace (voiced by Stephen Colbert) – Ace is the leader of the duo. He is mentor to Gary, whom he refers to as "friend of friends." He has a wide array of superhuman powers, including most (if not all) of Gary's powers.
- Gary (voiced by Steve Carell) – Gary is Ace's "sidekick" and protégé, and the younger of the duo. Gary is less experienced, and has fewer superhuman powers than Ace. His powers include superhuman strength, breath, stamina, flexibility, flight (though Ace and Gary use the phallic-shaped Duocar more often than they fly), and "laser vision."

=== Supporting characters ===
- Announcer (voiced by Bill Chott) – The Announcer is a disembodied voice who announces the title of each episode.
- The Police Commissioner (voiced by Steve Carell) – The Police Commissioner is the duo's primary contact, and when trouble arises, he makes the call to their hangout. His calls tend to interrupt a workout of some kind, with one or the other of the duo shirtless.
- The Chief of Police (voiced by Bill Chott) – The Chief of Police is seen with the commissioner, apparently waiting to find evidence in support of his belief that Ace and Gary are gay.
- Kijoro – Kijoro is the duo's mentor whose spirit resides in the "Fortress of Privacy" and offers advice from time to time when Ace and Gary seek counsel.
- Piño – The butler of Ace and Gary.

=== Villains ===
- Bighead (voiced by Robert Smigel) – Bighead is a mad scientist with a very large, bald head, and is usually the brains behind most of the evil schemes. Second only to his primary vocation of mad scientist is his obsession with outing the superheroes as gay, which tends to annoy his co-conspirators because they do not care about the duo's sexuality and only want to defeat them in order to rule the world. He is constantly criticized for the amount of energy he invests in this pursuit.
  - Bighead Henchmen (voiced by Robert Smigel) - The unnamed henchmen of Bighead who wear blue outfits.
- Dr. Brainio (voiced by Stephen Colbert) – Dr. Brainio is another mad scientist with a brain suspended above his head and attached by a trio of cables and tubing that go into his head. He occasionally partners with Bighead, but is quite a bit more undecided about Ace and Gary.
- Orbitrox – Orbitrox is a small, green, free-floating droid who sides with Bighead on the question of Ace's and Gary's sexual orientation. His sounds are translated by subtitles. Orbitrox has proffered evidence of them having visited gay bars, but he emphatically denies visiting them himself while snapping in subtitled form "Back off, dickweed, it's research!"
- Beetles of Zolaro (voiced by Robert Smigel) – A race of alien beetles from the planet Zolaro.
- Queen Serena (voiced by Ana Gasteyer) – An intergalactic queen from the planetoid Garassas that is an ally of Bighead.
- Flame Eye (voiced by Bill Hader) – An ally of Bighead and Dr. Brainio with a fiery right eye that can shoot fire from it.
- Lizardo (voiced by Robert Smigel) – A lizard man ally of Bighead and Dr. Brainio.
- Half-Scary (voiced by Robert Smigel) – A Two-Face-like ally of Bighead and Dr. Brainio.
- Flatside (voiced by Bill Hader impersonating Edward G. Robinson) – An ally of Bighead and Dr. Brainio whose head is flat on one side.

== Episodes ==
The first episode debuted on The Dana Carvey Show, and was re-aired on Saturday Night Live in September 1996. Subsequent episodes debuted on Saturday Night Live.

| No. | Title | Written by | Original release date |
|---|---|---|---|
| 1 | "It Takes Two to Tango" | Robert Smigel | March 19, 1996 |
Ace and Gary foil Bighead's plan to take over Metroville.
| 2 | "Queen of Terror" | Robert Smigel, Michelle Saks Smigel, & Stephen Colbert | November 2, 1996 |
Ace and Gary work to stop Bighead and Queen Serena's evil scheme to take over the universe by luring them to Queen Serena's planetoid Garassas.
| 3 | "Don We Now... or Never" | Robert Smigel & Stephen Colbert | December 14, 1996 |
Santa Claus has been kidnapped by the beetles of the planet Zolaro, and the Duo must save him.
| 4 | "Safety Tips" | Robert Smigel, Adam McKay, & Stephen Colbert | April 19, 1997 |
Ace and Gary demonstrate bicycle and home safety tips for local kids.
| 5 | "Blow Hot, Blow Cold" | Robert Smigel & Stephen Colbert | November 15, 1997 |
The Duo battles Dr. Brainio and Bighead's ice monster creation in their plot to freeze the Earth.
| 6 | "A Hard One to Swallow" | Robert Smigel, Adam McKay, Bill Chott, & Stephen Colbert | May 9, 1998 |
After defeating Bighead and Dr. Brainio's ice monster, Ace and Gary retreat to their Fortress of Privacy to consult Kijoro about why people are always looking at them funny. Meanwhile, Bighead, Dr. Brainio, Queen Serena, a beetle from Zolaro, and some other villains debate if Ace and Gary are gay.
| 7 | "Ace and Gary's Fan Club" | Robert Smigel, Michelle Saks Smigel, & Adam McKay | November 21, 1998 |
Ace and Gary are oblivious to the suggestiveness in letters from their fans, who are mostly criminal convicts.
| 8 | "AmbiguoBoys" | Robert Smigel & Stephen Colbert | May 8, 1999 |
Even before they were the Ambiguously Gay Duo, teenagers Ace and Gary fought evil. This episode shows that Bighead was in their class and he is determined to win his classmates' respect and "out" the duo. When he reanimates and enlarges a giant frog, the AmbiguoBoys must stop him.
| 9 | "Trouble Coming Twice" | Robert Smigel | May 13, 2000 |
Ace and Gary battle Bighead's evil schemes at the NBA Finals.
| 10 | "The Third Leg of Justice" | Robert Smigel & Stephen Colbert | October 19, 2002 |
Bighead is at it again and redecorates his lair in another attempt to out Gary and Ace while using the ice monster as bait. The Duo is assisted by former GE chairman and superhero Jack Welch.
| 11 | "First Served, First Come" | Robert Smigel & Andrew Steele | September 29, 2007 |
Bighead enlists Police Sergeant Karznia of the Minneapolis St. Paul Airport's Undercover Police to out Ace and Gary at his "bury the hatchet" BBQ where Bighead has Dr. Brainio, Orbitrox, the beetles from Zolaro, Flame Eye, Lizardo, Half-Scary, and Flatside. Bighead's attempts to get Ace and Gary to eat Mexican and spicy Indian foods enough for them to go do gay-related activities in the double outhouse ends up backfiring when everyone else has to go only to find that Sergeant Karznia was engaging in a strange activity with Lizardo.
| 12 | "The Dark, Clenched Hole of Evil" | Robert Smigel, Stephen Colbert, Akiva Schaffer, Jason Woliner, David Wachtenheim, & Brian Reich | May 15, 2011 |
Bighead and Dr. Brainio devise a way so that nobody would be safe from their carnivorous Cyber-Eel. When Ace and Gary arrive upon Bighead, Dr. Brainio, a beetle from Zolaro, Half-Scary and Lizardo hacking into their credit card accounts, Half-Scary blasts Ace and Gary with a flesh ray, transforming them from animated characters to live-action ones, respectively as a way so that the gun malfunctions and "unanimates" everyone where the Cyber-Eel is a puppet. The live-action cast features Jon Hamm as Ace, Jimmy Fallon as Gary, Ed Helms playing Half-Scary, Fred Armisen as Lizardo, Stephen Colbert as Dr. Brainio, and Steve Carell as Bighead.

=== Other appearances ===
On January 12, 2002: (Josh Hartnett/Pink), The Ambiguously Gay Duo makes a surprise appearance in The X-Presidents episode "The Hunt for Osama." The Ambiguously Gay Duo show up in their Duocar where they help the X-Presidents capture Osama bin Laden. The skit was written by Smigel, McKay, and Louis C.K. On April 29, 2006: The Ambiguously Gay Duo co-hosted Saturday Night Live: The Best of TV Funhouse. The hosting duties included the opening monologue performed by Ace and Gary, plus new animated/live-action material during the pre-commercial and post-commercial bumpers. It was revealed during these bumper segments that they seem to have an undying obsession with former cast member Jimmy Fallon. The show ended with the duo taking cast members Jason Sudeikis and Andy Samberg to their secret headquarters — both naked — in the Duocar, with announcer Don Pardo begging to be taken with them and a spurned Jimmy Fallon looking on from his apartment window with tears in his eyes. Colbert was not present during the taping of this episode, as he was hosting the 2006 White House Correspondents' Association Dinner that same night.

In May 2011, a live-action skit based on the series appeared in a Saturday Night Live episode, with Jon Hamm playing Ace and Jimmy Fallon playing Gary. Daniel Villarreal criticized the skit as biphobic and questioned whether two non-gay actors portraying the parts was progressive or problematic.

In 2015, Bif Bang Pow Toys produced and released a new 8" retro action-figure line of Ace and Gary titled the Ambiguously Gay Duo 8" retro action figure series. They were both individually packaged on a card but sold together in a set at the Entertainment Earth Catalog and website and at other toy and comic book stores as well. That same year, Bif Bang Pow Toys produced the Ambiguously Gay Duo Tin Tote (Lunchbox) action figure set of three 5" action-figures of Ace, Gary, and Bighead.

== Film adaptation ==
The original idea for a live-action movie first came up in 2000 when someone pitched the idea to Smigel, he initially balked. "But then I thought, 'What about a live-action one with Alec Baldwin and Jimmy Fallon?'" Smigel recalled. Lorne Michaels loved the idea, but ownership disputes between Universal, who still held rights from the Dana Carvey Show days, and Paramount, who produced SNL films, kept the project from being made. The idea was shelved until years later, when Carell told his Bruce Almighty co-star, Jim Carrey about it. In 2005, Universal commissioned a script and Smigel brought Colbert over to write it, once finished they pitched it to Carrey, but it never made it into production. Some of the jokes were included in the 2011 live-action episode. Smigel recalled that one of Colbert's ideas for the script was an opening sequence that featured a naked muscular male chest, with the credits appearing on it formed by water and soap.

== Reception ==
Matt Goldberg of Collider said that the series was a "one-note joke" but that it worked well as a "great parody of superhero cartoon shows."

Adam Polaski of The Good Men Project praised the animation and the live-action sketch in 2011 as a satire that spoofs "the inherently homoerotic nature of superheroes... [and the] stereotype that gay men are obsessed with sex."

Francis Rizzo III of DVD Talk, while calling the cartoons "silly" and "formulaic", praised the voice work from Colbert and Carell, along with how the series served as a "visual parody of old cartoons", especially the homoerotic theories about Batman and Robin.

TVLine writers said in 2018 that if the crime fighters had reappeared that year, viewers might have found out whether the two protagonists had changed, whether they'd be "out and proud, rebranded as the Unambiguously Gay Duo", and whether they'd fight to mend "the social divisions in our country."

== See also ==
- List of Saturday TV Funhouse segments
