= LGBTQ themes in American mainstream comics =

American comics addressing LGBTQ materials

In American mainstream comics, LGBTQ themes and characters were historically omitted intentionally from the content of comic books, due to either formal censorship or the perception that comics were for children and thus LGBTQ themes were somehow inappropriate. With any mention of homosexuality in mainstream United States comics forbidden by the Comics Code Authority (CCA) until 1989, earlier attempts at exploring these issues in the US took the form of subtle hints or subtext regarding a character's sexual orientation. LGBTQ themes were tackled earlier in underground comix from the early 1970s onward. Independently published one-off comic books and series, often produced by gay creators and featuring autobiographical storylines, tackled political issues of interest to LGBTQ readers.

Mainstream comics—the genre of superhero comics published in the United States since the late 1930s—have historically excluded gay characters, and the superhero genre and its two largest publishing houses, Marvel Comics and DC Comics, have been criticised for their lack of inclusivity. Transgender characters have likewise been under-represented, although the common storyline of a superhero having their sex changed by magical or technological means has been regarded as an oblique reference to transgender and transsexual issues. Queer theory analyses have noted that LGBTQ characters in mainstream comic books are often shown as assimilated into heterosexual society, whereas in alternative comics the diversity and uniqueness of LGBTQ culture is at the forefront. Mainstream comics have also been labelled as "heteronormative", in comparison to "integrationist" alternative comics. Since the 1990s LGBTQ themes have become more common in mainstream US comics, including in a number of titles in which a gay character is the star.

== Censorship, criticism and inclusivity ==
For much of the 20th century, creators were strongly discouraged from depicting gay relationships in comic books, which were regarded as a medium for children. Until 1989 the Comics Code Authority (CCA), which imposed de facto censorship on comics sold through newsstands in the United States, forbade any suggestion of homosexuality, and LGBTQ characters were excluded from comics bearing the CCA seal. The CCA itself came into being in response to Fredric Wertham's Seduction of the Innocent, in which comic book creators were accused of attempting to negatively influence children with images of violence and sexuality, including subliminal homosexuality. Wertham claimed that Wonder Woman's strength and independence made her a lesbian, and stated that "The Batman type of story may stimulate children to homosexual fantasies." Storytellers subsequently had to drop subtle hints while not stating directly a character's orientation. Overt gay and lesbian themes were first found later in underground and alternative titles which did not carry the CCA's seal of approval.

In recent years the number of LGBTQ characters in mainstream superhero comics has increased greatly. At first gay characters appeared in supporting roles, but their roles have become increasingly prominent. The trend has prompted both praise from the LGBTQ community and organizations like the Gay & Lesbian Alliance Against Defamation (GLAAD), and criticism from conservative groups. Critics make regular accusations that comics are attempting to subvert readers into a "gay lifestyle", trying to "lure young American boys into the kinky web of homosexuality and AIDS".

According to writer Devin Grayson, the amount of creative freedom allowed by editors in the portrayal of LGBTQ characters depends upon how popular and established a character already is. Long-standing characters that would require a retcon to change their sexuality are less likely to be shown as LGBTQ than newer characters. When such changes to a character's continuity are made, fans are often disgruntled, particularly when sexuality is involved, and Alan Moore suggests that creating a new character is preferable.

Scott Lobdell claims that it is more often the fans, rather than editors, that have stronger negative reaction to LGBTQ issues. Moore notes however, that "it's probably quite fashionable... to have the odd gay character," and that the inclusion of LGBTQ people continues to improve in mainstream comics, but that the characters continue to be limited by stereotypes and do not represent a varied cross-section of LGBTQ people. Greg Rucka says that some scenes of same-sex interactions are rejected by editors due to unease with sexual content in general rather than the LGBT content.

On the other hand, inclusion of LGBT issues attract media attention, in which the hype makes some fans and creators uncomfortable. Podcaster Faust points out for example, that gay marriage in a comic issue is treated almost as an "event", when that series had already been significant with openly gay characters. Lobdell, while wondering about the attention media gives gay characters, hopes that in the near future, they will not "make the news at all, because they are as common as capes and cowls."

== DC ==
=== Pre-1990s ===
The Encyclopedia of Gay Histories and Cultures (2000) notes that gay subtext can be found in DC Comics publications as early as the Golden Age of Comic Books, with readers inferring homosexuality between superheroes and their same-sex sidekicks and on the women-only Paradise Island. Batman's relationship with Robin has famously come under scrutiny, in spite of the majority of creators associated with the character denying that the character is gay. Psychologist Fredric Wertham, who in Seduction of the Innocent asserted that "Batman stories are psychologically homosexual," claimed to find a "subtle atmosphere of homoeroticism which pervades the adventures of the mature 'Batman' and his young friend 'Robin.'" It has also been claimed that Batman is interesting to gay audiences because "he was one of the first fictional characters to be attacked on the grounds of his presumed homosexuality," and "the 1960s TV series remains a touchstone of camp." Frank Miller has described the Joker as a "homophobic nightmare", and views Batman as sublimating his sexual urges into crime fighting. Burt Ward, who portrayed Robin in Batman (1966), has also remarked upon this interpretation in his autobiography, noting that the relationship between the two could be interpreted as a sexual one. When creating the character of Jericho in Teen Titans, Marv Wolfman and George Pérez considered making him gay, which would have marked one of the first appearances of a gay character in a major super hero book. However, they ultimately passed on the idea after concluding that it would be too stereotypical to make the sensitive, artistic, effeminate featured Jericho a homosexual.

One Autostraddle reviewer, Mey Rude, noted that one early example of a "not-quite-trans recurring character" was in the 1940 Action Comics #20 with Ultra-Humanite, a villain to Superman, was killed, but he kidnaps actress Delores Winters, placing "his mighty brain in her young vital body." Two issues later, in no. 22, this version of Ultra-Humanite is gone with the character instead transferring his "consciousness into the body of an albino ape." Many years later, in the 1980s, in the Camelot 3000 series, one night, Sir Tristan, is "reincarnated as a woman", tries to change back into a man for much of the comic, but ultimately accepts it. Rude criticized this as showing a "lack of awareness of real life trans people that comics had."

The first obviously gay character was Extraño, an effeminate Hispanic man whose name means "Strange" in Spanish, who was created by Steve Englehart and Joe Staton and appeared in Millennium and New Guardians in 1987. (Note: First appearance in Millennium #2 (1987)) New Guardians was not successful, but during its short run it also featured a character dying of AIDS. An official aftermath to Millennium, The Spectre (vol. 2) #11, depicted a "mostly male and mostly gay" AIDS rally. Several characters, including the Enchantress (describing them as "filthy disgusting men") and a police helicopter pilot named Ed (screaming about "fags") are influenced into attempting to crush the rally by a seven-headed spirit. Thanks to the actions of the Spectre, Doctor Fate, Deadman, Madame Xanadu, and Ben Turner, the men are saved.

Previous to this, in the hugely influential Watchmen (1986), one of the central characters, Ozymandias, is referred to as "possibly homosexual" by Rorschach, whom critics have interpreted as asexual. (Note: Watchmen #1 (1986)) The series also strongly implied that minor characters Hooded Justice and Captain Metropolis were gay, and that Silhouette was kicked off the Minutemen superhero team when she was publicly outed as a lesbian. In Watchmen and Philosophy, Mark White and William Irwin write that the gay relationships in Watchmen remain ambiguous as "lots of heteros are icked out by homos", and also that Watchmen is particularly surprising and challenges preconceptions of homosexuality, as "if it's true that Hooded Justice and Captain Metropolis are gay, they sure as heck don't act or look like they are gay". Alan Moore was described by AfterElton.com writer Lyle Masaki as "very gay friendly", due to his inclusion of complex LGBT characters and realistic treatment of LGBT issues in Watchmen and V for Vendetta.

=== 1990s ===
The early 1990s saw a few more LGBT minor characters portrayed in DC titles. Transgender themes were explored in a 1992 storyline in Legion of Super-Heroes, in which Element Lad finds out that Shvaughn Erin, the woman he is in love with, is actually a man who has taken a sex-change drug to be with him; Element Lad reveals that he does not care if Shvaughn is a man or a woman. (Note: In The Legion of Super-Heroes #31 (1992)) This portrayal was criticized for a lack of knowledge about trans characters, saying that the writers of this comic seemed to think that "trans women are just gay men who want to date straight men." A lesbian relationship was also implied between the Legion of Super-Heroes' Shrinking Violet and Lightning Lass, but all these non-heterosexual characters were retconned to be straight following Zero Hour: Crisis in Time!, which rebooted the Legion's continuity. Camelot 3000 also explored transsexual themes by having Sir Tristan reincarnated into the body of a woman, to his initial dismay. (Note: Camelot 3000 #1–12 (1997)) Notable storylines featuring LGBT themes include the 1991's The Flash (vol. 2) #53, which had received the first GLAAD Award for Best Comic Book in 1992. Here, the reformed villain Pied Piper was revealed as gay. Another is the coming out of Kyle Rayner's assistant and an arc about his "gay bashing" in Green Lantern, both written by Judd Winick. (Note: In Green Lantern #137 (June 2001) and #154 (November 2001)) These stories earned the writer title two GLAAD awards and a Gaylactic Spectrum Awards (and a further nomination). Green Lantern also has a lesbian couple, Lee and Li, as supporting characters.

The 1990s title Doom Patrol introduced a number of LGBT characters and explored transsexual themes. Doom Patrol's base of operations in later stories is the sentient transvestite street Danny the Street. Danny is named after British female impersonator Danny La Rue, and "dresses in drag" by hosting typically masculine shops (such as gun shops), but decorating them in bright frilly patterns and pastel curtains. His inclusion is described by Timothy Callahan as part of the "increasingly absurd" tone of the book from the twentieth issue. (Note: Created by Grant Morrison and Brendan McCarthy and first appeared in Doom Patrol vol. 2, #35 (August 1990).) One member of the team is the transsexual, bisexual Coagula, who can coagulate liquids and dissolve solids, created by transsexual fantasy writer Rachel Pollack. Coagula gains her powers while working as a prostitute. One of her customers is Rebis, a radioactive hermaphrodite, and Coagula gains her powers after having sex with them.

DC Comics has a number of imprints, including WildStorm and Vertigo. Wildstorm was originally a studio producing work for Image Comics, which is noted to have a greater proportion of LGBT characters. Vertigo is an imprint that produces comics for more mature audiences, allowing more sexual themes. George Haggerty notes in Gay histories and cultures: an encyclopedia that "substantive mainstream presentation of gay themes in the future seems most likely in DC's adult-orientated Vertigo titles." Vertigo titles that have tackled LGBT themes include Sandman, Shade, the Changing Man and Enigma. The Sandman: A Game of You (1991) had a transsexual character, and its creator Neil Gaiman said that he included transgender characters in his works in response to the lack of realistic representation of such people in comics. The title character of Shade, the Changing Man was an alien who could change his surface form: This resulted in people sometimes perceiving him as female, and although he remained essentially male, it was implied that he had relationships with both genders. Enigma (1992) deconstructed the superhero genre, with the title characters homosexuality playing a large part. John Constantine, the protagonist of Hellblazer, was first hinted as bisexual in 1992, and confirmed in 2002. (Note: Hellblazer #51 (1992)) (Note: Hellblazer #170 (2002)) In the television series however, Constantine was portrayed straight due to NBC guidelines, which brought on criticism from both critics and fans.

An example of a gay character in a starring role is the violent vigilante superhero Midnighter, who appears in comic books first published by Wildstorm. (Note: First appearance Stormwatch (vol. 2) #4 (1998)) Midnighter was revealed to be in a relationship with Apollo during their time as members of the superhero team The Authority. The portrayal of the relationship was initially subtle, with writer Warren Ellis not informing the artist of his intentions. However, the DC editorial board still censored a kiss between the two characters in 2000. Described as the "first openly gay couple in comics", Midnighter and Apollo married in a later issue and have an adopted daughter. Midnighter starred in his own solo title from 2006; the Midnighter comic was criticized by François Peneaud for ignoring the protagonist's relationship with his husband, and also for the continual use of homophobic insults by villains. Criticism has also been leveled at a storyline in which Apollo is raped, with critics saying that straight superheroes are never subjected to such treatment. Alan Moore pointed to the characters as an example of comics' "strange attitude" towards LGBT themes, describing them as "vicious muscle queens". Starting 2015, Midnighter once again stars in his own solo series, published from DC Comics, making him the first gay male superhero to have his own series in a mainstream publisher.

The 1990s also brought with it more almost trans characters. A few years later, in 1997, Comet appeared in the Supergirl comics and was revealed to be a shapeshifter who could alternate between a bisexual woman named Andrea Martinez and the male centaur Comet. It was also a time where there was a "rise of alternative comics at DC", which gave more roles to trans characters.

=== 2000s ===
Manhunter, created by Mark Andreyko in 2004, caused reaction in the fan community when it was revealed that the boyfriend of the title character's gay co-counsel was long-time Infinity, Inc. member Obsidian. Obsidian had a number of failed heterosexual romances in Infinity, Inc. and while a member of the Justice League, and later struggled to come to terms with his sexuality, but it was not until his appearances in Manhunter that the character was revealed to be gay and to have accepted his homosexuality. Andreyko said that making the character openly gay could be seen as a retcon, but that this seemed a logical step in character's growth. In 2006, one character, Erik Storn, was given superpowers allowing him to change into a female superhero, while two years later, Loki, was portrayed as a woman from 2008 to 2009. Later on, Al Ewing in Loki: Agent of Asgard to say "Loki is bi... He'll shift between genders occasionally as well," resulting in one reviewer saying that Loki could be seen as trans.

Homosexual interpretations of Batman have continued into the 21st century. One notable example occurred in 2000, when DC Comics refused permission for the reprinting of four panels (from Batman #79, 92, 105, and 139) to illustrate Christopher York's paper All in the Family: Homophobia and Batman Comics in the 1950s. In summer 2005, painter Mark Chamberlain displayed a number of watercolours depicting both Batman and Robin in suggestive and sexually explicit poses. DC threatened both the artist and the Kathleen Cullen Fine Arts gallery with legal action if they did not cease selling the works and demanded the surrender of all remaining art, as well as any profits derived from them.

In 2006 DC drew widespread media attention by announcing Kate Kane, a new, lesbian incarnation of the well-known character Batwoman, even while openly lesbian characters such as Gotham City police officer Renee Montoya already existed in DC Comics. It was revealed at the 2009 New York Comic Con that she would be DC Comics' highest profile gay superhero, appearing in a new Justice League comic book written by James Robinson and taking over as the lead character in Detective Comics with issue #854. Greg Rucka said that DC's editors had no problem with his writing Montoya or Batwoman as lesbian, but the media controversy over Batwoman's sexuality "nullified any positive effect Batwoman might have had on the industry" and forced the character into minor roles during major crossover storylines. In 2011, Batwoman gained her own title as part of The New 52 DC comics relaunch. This makes her the first LGBT character to headline a monthly series in the DC Universe.

In 2006, Gail Simone brought back the Secret Six as a team of villains with new members, in which many are LGBT, including lesbian Scandal Savage, her lover Knockout, pansexual Rag Doll, bisexual Jeannette, and Catman, who is also bisexual. Secret Six relaunched in December 2014, with Simone returning as writer. Scandal Savage, Rag Doll, and Jeannette return as recurring characters. The team consists of new members save Catman, and among them, Porcelain is genderfluid.

=== 2010s ===
In Earth 2, Green Lantern Alan Scott was revealed as gay. In issue 2, Scott is revealed to have a boyfriend named Sam, to whom he intends to propose while on vacation in China. Before he can do so, however, the train on which the couple is travelling is suddenly wrecked. A mysterious green flame protects Scott and heals him; a disembodied voice informs him that the crash was caused by a force that threatens the whole world, and that Sam did not survive. The grief-stricken Scott is then told that he will be given the power to avenge his love and protect the world.

Alongside Batwoman, DC also released a series starring Voodoo, a bisexual African American woman, as part of The New 52 relaunch. The same relaunch also introduced Bunker, an openly gay Latino superhero, as part of the core cast of the new Teen Titans series. Demon Knights introduced Shining Knight (Ystina), who previously appeared in Grant Morrison's Seven Soldiers of Victory as a girl crossdressing as a male knight. In the new series however, Shining Knight says that he is "not just a man or a woman[, but] both." (Note: Demon Knights #14 (2012)) This makes him the possible first intersex hero.

The number of minor DC characters being identified as LGBTQ continues to increase, including bisexual superheroes Sarah Rainmaker and Icemaiden, as well as major ones such as Catwoman and Jericho. In Catwoman #39, she was confirmed bisexual, which critics claim iconic, as she is one of the most famous characters in the DC Universe. Furthermore, DC Comics officially stated that Harley Quinn and Poison Ivy, whose relationship many fans have speculated as romantic or sexual, are "girlfriends without the jealousy of monogamy."

In 2016, Sensation Comics featured Wonder Woman officiating a same-sex wedding (Issue #48) drawn by Australian illustrator Jason Badower. Inspired by the June Supreme Court ruling that established marriage equality in all 50 United States, Badower says DC Comics was "fantastic" about his idea for the issue. In an interview with The Sydney Morning Herald, he said his editor "Was like 'great, I love it! Let's do it. It was almost anticlimactic." Wonder Woman's advocacy for gay rights was taken a step further in September 2016, when comic book writer Greg Rucka announced that she is canonically bisexual, according to her rebooted Rebirth origin. Rucka stated that in his opinion, she "has to be" queer and has "obviously" had same-sex relationships on an island surrounded by beautiful women. Wonder Woman's bisexuality had previously been hinted at by Rucka when he wrote the character in 2003. It had also been explicitly stated in the alternate continuity or non-canon Earth One by Grant Morrison, and fellow Wonder Woman writer Gail Simone staunchly supported Rucka's statement. Surprised at the amount of backlash from her fanbase, Rucka responded to "haters" that consensual sex with women is just as important to Wonder Woman as the Truth is to Superman. As well as Wonder Woman herself, several members of her supporting cast have since been revealed as gay or bisexual including Hippolyta, Philippus, Nubia, and Etta Candy.

=== 2020s ===
Tim Drake's storyline in Batman: Urban Legends sees him deal with unexpressed insecurities while reconnecting with a friend from earlier volumes, Bernard Dowd. Bernard is kidnapped, sending Tim on a rescue mission while still trying to understand what he truly desires from life. During the rescue, Bernard tells Robin that his friend Tim helped him come out and understand himself, prompting Robin/Tim to have the same realization for himself. Afterward, out of costume, Bernard asks Tim on a date, which Tim accepts.

In Issue #5 of Superman: Son of Kal-El, Clark Kent's son Jon Kent, the new Superman of Earth, is revealed to be bisexual and begins a relationship with his new partner, reporter Jay Nakamura.

== Marvel ==
=== 1990s ===
Marvel Comics' incorporation of LGBT themes has been unfavorably compared with that of DC; its use of gay characters has been described as "less prolific but more deliberate". Some reviewers have pointed out in Alpha Flight #45, in 1987, there was an "almost" trans character: Sasquatch. He was "killed", with his soul transferred into a woman's body, meaning that he had a female body when human, and male when in his Sasquatch form. More broadly, Marvel reportedly had a "No Gays in the Marvel Universe" policy during Jim Shooter's 1980s tenure, and Marvel's policy from the 1990s had stated that all series emphasizing solo gay characters must carry an "Adults Only" label, in response to conservative protests. In 2006, publisher Joe Quesada claimed that this policy is no longer in force. Although same-sex couples are depicted occasionally kissing, intimate or sexual scenes have not been shown, even in Marvel's "Adult only" imprint. The use of mutants and the discrimination they face in the X-Men comics has been seen as a metaphor for the real-world discrimination directed at minority groups, including LGBT people.

Alpha Flight's Northstar, a member of the original Alpha Flight superhero team, was the first major gay character created by Marvel Comics. Creator John Byrne said that Northstar was planned to be gay from his inception in 1979, but although hints about Northstar's sexual identity appeared during 1983 in issues 7 and 8 of Alpha Flight, his apparent lack of interest in women was attributed to his obsessive drive to win as a ski champion. The character was revealed to be gay in 1992's Alpha Flight issue 106, the only comic book issue to have been inducted into the Gaylactic Hall of Fame. Storylines involving Northstar have included an illness seen by some readers as a metaphor for AIDS, which was cured when it revealed that the character is actually a part "fairy", a race of non-human beings. Northstar also adopts an abandoned baby, which soon dies of AIDS. Criticism has been levelled at the fact that in 30 years Northstar has never been shown kissing another man, although many interactions with other gay characters are shown, as in the Marvel Swimsuit Special, in which he is shown socializing with the gay Pantheon member Hector.

After the cancellation of Alpha Flight Northstar appeared in his own miniseries, which mostly ignored his sexuality, and eventually became a member of the X-Men. During his time in this team he became a mentor to gay teenage mutant Anole, who later became a Young X-Men member along with another gay teen, Graymalkin. Notable also in Northstar's tenure in the X-Men was his death in three separate continuities in the same month. Other LGBT members of Marvel's mutant teams were X-Statix's Phat, Vivisector, and Bloke (until their deaths) and the villain Mystique, the latter having been in a relationship with the character Destiny, although this was not explicitly revealed until years after the relationship had ended with Destiny's murder.

=== 2000s ===
Freedom Ring was a character depicted as gay from his debut by his creator Robert Kirkman. Joe Quesada touted him as Marvel Comics' leading gay hero, with stories dedicated to his adventures in Marvel Team-Up. Despite this, the character was killed one month later. His death and general treatment was met with some negative reactions, including accusations of homophobia, particularly with respect to the phallic imagery of the death, with the character being killed by being impaled with spikes. Kirkman commented on the controversy, stating "Freedom Ring was always planned as an inexperienced hero who would get beaten up constantly and probably die. I wanted to comment on the fact that most superheroes get their powers and are okay at it... and that's not how life works. During working on the book, I was also noticing that most gay characters... are all about being gay. Straight characters are well-rounded characters who like chicks. So I wanted to do a well-rounded character who just happened to like dudes. Then I decided to combine the two ideas. In hindsight, yeah, killing a gay character is no good when there are so few of them... but I really had only the best of intentions in mind." Kirkman later stated, "Frankly, with the SMALL amount of gay characters in comics in general, and how unfortunate the portrayals have been thus far, whether intentional or not—I completely understand the backlash on the death of Freedom Ring, regardless of my intentions. If I had it to do all over again... I wouldn't kill him. I regret it more and more as time goes on. I got rid of what? 20% of the gay characters at Marvel by killing off this ONE character. I just never took that stuff into consideration while I was writing."

In the 2000s there was the introduction of two characters who were almost trans: the Ultimate Marvel incarnation of Jessica Drew, a "female clone of Peter Parker", and Courier, a shapeshifting friend who becomes "trapped in a female form by the evil Mr. Sinister." There was also the advent of Xavin, a shapeshifter in the Runaways with Xavin originally male but changes to a female form, saying in issue no. 8 that "for us changing our gender is no different than changing our hair color." While Autostraddle's Mey Rude says that she does not consider Xavin to represent the human trans experience, the character explored gender changes in "a way that was pretty revolutionary for a comic book character."

In 2002, Marvel revived Rawhide Kid in their Marvel MAX imprint, introducing the first openly gay comic book character to star in his own magazine. The first edition of Rawhide Kid's gay saga was called Slap Leather. According to a CNN.com article, "The new series pairs the original artist, John Severin, now 86, with Ron Zimmerman, a television writer. Making the Rawhide Kid gay was Zimmerman's idea. The character's sexuality is conveyed indirectly, through euphemisms and puns, and the comic's style is campy. Conservative groups protested the gay take on the character, which they claimed would corrupt children, and the covers carried an "Adults only" label.

The Young Avengers series, which debuted in 2005, featured two gay teenager major characters, Hulkling and Wiccan, from its inception. The characters' sexuality was criticised by some readers and defended by the writers in an extended series of letters on the title's letters page. The Young Avengers earned Marvel its first (and to date only) GLAAD Award Best Comic Book Award in 2005. Hulkling was originally planned to be a female character: According to Tom Brevoort, "Originally, Allan pitched Hulkling as a female character using her shape-changing abilities to pose as a man. I suspect this was as close as Allan felt he could get to depicting an openly gay relationship in a Marvel comic. But as we got underway... he started to have second thoughts and approached me about maintaining Hulkling and Wiccan as two involved male characters."

In X-Factor, written by Peter David, Rictor and his longtime friend Shatterstar (with whom he previously had an ambiguous relationship) (Note: See, for example: Cable #22, X-Force #56, X-Force #59–60, X-Force #60, X-Force ’99 Annual) were shown in an on-panel kiss. (Note: X-Factor v.3 #45) After the issue was published, David confirmed Rictor and Shatterstar's bisexuality in his blog and expressed his desire to develop the relationship between them further. Shortly after, one of Shatterstar's creators, Rob Liefeld, expressed his disapproval of David's decision. Despite his complaints, David and Marvel editor-in-chief Joe Quesada defended the development, and the story went on as planned.

=== 2010s ===
2010's Avengers: The Children's Crusade #9 would see Wiccan and Hulkling get engaged and have their first on-panel kiss, a story that would be continued in 2020's Empyre #4, which reveals the secret wedding of Wiccan and Hulkling on Earth with their fellow Young Avengers in attendance, and Empyre Aftermath: Avengers #1 which shows their traditional Kree/Skrull and Jewish wedding in space, with numerous other superheroes attending after Hulkling became the emperor of the Kree/Skrull alliance.

2012's Astonishing X-Men #51 held Northstar and his long-term partner, Kyle Jinadu's wedding. Though it is not the first same-sex marriage to be featured in superhero comics, as Apollo and Midnighter had married in The Authority, this is the first in mainstream comics.

Due to flirtations with characters of various genders and sexuality, fans have speculated Deadpool as pan- or omnisexual. Writers Gerry Duggan and Gail Simone, as well as Tim Miller, the director of the Deadpool film, accepts the fan theory. However, Fabian Nicieza, one of the creators of the character, stated on Twitter that such speculation on his sexuality is invalid because his "brain cells are in CONSTANT FLUX. He can be gay one minute, hetero the next, etc." The comment upset many fans, for it suggests that Deadpool's sexuality is linked to his mental disorder.

Hercules, in previous works such as Hercules: Fall of an Avenger and X-Treme X-Men, was portrayed as bisexual. (Note: Hercules: Fall of an Avenger (2010), X-Treme X-Men #10 (2013)) However, Marvel's editor-in-chief Axel Alonso stated that Hercules in the new series will be heterosexual, which disappointed fans and critics for "straightwashing" an LGBT character.

Other major characters that have confirmed to be LGBT include Iceman, who came out as gay, and Loki, who is now genderfluid and bisexual.

== Other publishers: Archie, Malibu, Image, Dark Horse ==
The 1990s saw the creation of a number of independent publishing houses with output that competed with the giants of mainstream comics publishing, Marvel and DC. The companies included Malibu Comics, Image Comics and later, Dark Horse Comics. These companies gave greater artistic freedom to their writers and artists and chose not to ascribe to the Comics Code, allowing exploration of more mature themes. As a result, comics from these companies included a greater relative number of LGBT characters and storylines than their more traditional competitors. LGBT superhero characters include Spectral and Turbo Charge (from Malibu comics), and Promethea and Gen^{13}'s Sarah Rainmaker (both created by Wildstorm for Image Comics before being taken over by DC). Image comic's A Distant Soil, written by Colleen Doran, depicts an alien culture with exotic gender and sexual mores and gay romances that gained the series a Gaylactic Spectrum Award nomination. Others notes that Malibu had, in the series Mantra, "an immortal male superhero soul who was reincarnated into the body of a woman" who is only "almost" trans, but not fully a trans characters, and in Rising Stars a possibly trans character named Joshua Cane.

Dark Horse's Buffy the Vampire Slayer-related comics feature the lesbian characters of Willow, Tara and Kennedy and the closeted character Andrew from the television series. The Buffy Season Eight comics attracted media attention when the title character has a one night stand with another girl who had fallen in love with her. (Note: Buffy Season Eight #12 (March 2008) and #15 (June 2008)) The encounter was repeated, but both the character and the creators denied that this made Buffy gay, with Joss Whedon saying: "We're not going to make her gay, nor are we going to take the next 50 issues explaining that she's not. She's young and experimenting, and did I mention open-minded?".

Archie featured their first gay character, Kevin Keller, in 2010. The American Family Association spoke out against the character and issues containing same-sex romance, but Veronica #202 had been so popular it sold out, resulting in his own solo series. Valiant Comics published a superhero title in 1992 entitled X-O Manowar, which featured a gay character by the name of Ken Clarkson. Although Clarkson's portrayal had been criticized, especially due to one of his creators Jim Shooter, the character has received acclaim for being the first gay sidekick in comic books.

Mey Rude, writing for Autostraddle, stated that the vast majority of actual trans representation happened from 2013 forward, which she considered the "Golden Age of Trans Comics", noting comics like Bitch Planet(by Kelly Sue DeConnick), The Unbeatable Squirrel Girl (by Erika Henderson), and various anthologies. This came with more comics being funded through crowdfunding sites and created by trans people, resulting in a "new kind of trans representation by the trans people, of the trans people and for the trans people."

== Fandom and awards ==
As the visibility of LGBT comic book creators and characters has increased, comic book fandom has taken notice. Panels discussing LGBT topics occur regularly at comic book and LGBT conventions such as Comicon and Gaylaxicon, and conventions also feature stands dedicated to LGBT comics. Ted Abenheim, event chair of Prism Comics said in 2008, "We're in our sixth year of exhibiting at Comic-Con, presenting a larger booth and more panels and events than ever before." A number of websites dedicated to LGBT comic book fandom and featuring content from staff writers exist, such as Prismcomics.org and Gayleague.com.

=== GLAAD awards ===
The first GLAAD Award for "outstanding comic book" was awarded in 1992 (to DC's The Flash). Since then, a number of GLAAD awards have been awarded to mainstream titles, including for DC's Green Lantern and The Authority titles, and Marvel's Young Avengers. According to Paul Lopez, LGBT fans and creators have "debated whether the awards for mainstream comics were more about media hype than the actual content of the comic's stories."

=== Gaylactic Spectrum Awards ===
The Gaylactic Spectrum Awards are given to works of science fiction, fantasy or horror published in the United States, and their "other works" category allows nomination of comic book series or individual issues. Comic book winners include issues of DC's Green Lantern, The Authority and Gotham Central, and nominations have been given to titles from Marvel (X-Force, X-Statix), Dark Horse (Buffy Season Eight) and Image Comics (A Distant Soil).

== See also ==
- LGBT themes in comics
- LGBT themes in speculative fiction
- LGBTQ characters in comics
- LGBTQ-related comics
