= Homosexuality in the Batman franchise =

Gay interpretations of Batman

Bruce Wayne and Dick Grayson in bed. Panel from Batman #84 (June 1954), page 24. Art by Sheldon Moldoff.

Academic study of the Batman franchise has involved gay interpretations since at least 1954, when psychiatrist Fredric Wertham asserted in his book Seduction of the Innocent that "Batman stories are psychologically homosexual". Several characters in the Modern Age Batman comic books are expressly gay, lesbian, or bisexual.

== Golden Age Batman ==
The early Golden Age Batman stories were dark and violent, but during the late 1940s and the early 1950s they changed to a softer, friendlier and more exotic style that was considered campy. This style awoke contemporary and later associations with gay culture.

In the 1954 Seduction of the Innocent, psychiatrist Fredric Wertham claimed, "the Batman type of story may stimulate children to homosexual fantasies, of the nature of which they may be unconscious" and "only someone ignorant of the fundamentals of psychiatry and of the psychopathology of sex can fail to realize a subtle atmosphere of homoeroticism which pervades the adventures of the mature 'Batman' and his young friend Robin". This book was issued in the context of the "lavender scare" where authorities regarded homosexuality as a security risk. Wertham's work is now often criticized, with one review of his work by Carol L. Tilley stating that he "manipulated, overstated, compromised and fabricated evidence".

Andy Medhurst wrote in his 1991 essay Batman, Deviance, and Camp that Batman is interesting to gay audiences because "he was one of the first fictional characters to be attacked on the grounds of his presumed homosexuality", "the 1960s TV series remains a touchstone of camp" and "[he] merits analysis as a notably successful construction of masculinity".

== Views within the industry ==
The Comics Bulletin website posed the question "Is Batman Gay?" to their staff and various comic book professionals. Writer Alan Grant has stated: "The Batman I wrote for 13 years isn't gay. Denny O'Neil's Batman, Marv Wolfman's Batman, everybody's Batman all the way back to Bob Kane… none of them wrote him as a gay character. Only Joel Schumacher might have had an opposing view". Writer Devin Grayson has commented: "It depends who you ask, doesn't it? Since you're asking me, I'll say no, I don't think he is… I certainly understand the gay readings, though". While Frank Miller has described the relationship between Batman and the Joker as a "homophobic nightmare", he views the character as sublimating his sexual urges into crime fighting, concluding, "He'd be much healthier if he were gay". Grant Morrison, writer of both Batman and Batman Incorporated said in an interview with Playboy that "Gayness is built into Batman. I'm not using gay in the pejorative sense, but Batman is very, very gay...Obviously as a fictional character he's intended to be heterosexual, but the basis of the whole concept is utterly gay". Morrison later said that Playboy misquoted them and explained in an interview with the New Statesman that the quote was "the opposite of what [they had] said". While one "could easily dial up the black-leather-fetishistic-night-dwelling aspects of Batman, and the masculinity of Batman, and get a pretty good gay Batman, [...] ultimately he's not gay because he has no sex life".

=== 1960s TV series ===
Burt Ward, who portrayed Robin in the 1960s TV series and film, wrote in his autobiography Boy Wonder: My Life in Tights that Batman and Robin could be interpreted as lovers.

=== Joel Schumacher's films ===
The 1995 feature film Batman Forever, and especially its 1997 sequel Batman & Robin, both helmed by the openly gay director Joel Schumacher, have been interpreted as having homoerotic overtones.

Slate magazine called Schumacher's Batman films "defiantly queer", with a "sugar daddy" Batman and "rough-trade" Robin. Slate noted that Robin wore a codpiece and "Bat-nipples" and said that what "Schumacher produced wasn't gay subtext; it was gay domtext".

Schumacher commented: "I had no idea that putting nipples on the Batsuit and Robin suit were going to spark international headlines. The bodies of the suits come from ancient Greek statues, which display perfect bodies. They are anatomically correct".

Chris O'Donnell, who portrayed Robin, felt "it wasn't so much the nipples that bothered me. It was the codpiece. The press obviously played it up and made it a big deal, especially with Joel directing. I didn't think twice about the controversy, but going back and looking and seeing some of the pictures, it was very unusual".

George Clooney joked, "Joel Schumacher told me we never made another Batman film because Batman was gay". In 2006, Clooney said in an interview with Barbara Walters that in Batman & Robin he played Batman as gay: "I was in a rubber suit and I had rubber nipples. I could have played Batman straight, but I made him gay". Walters then asked, "George, is Batman gay?", to which he responded, "No, but I made him gay".

=== Animation ===
A direct-to-video animated film Batman and Harley Quinn alludes to both the notion of a homosexual relationship between Batman and Robin, and to Seduction of the Innocent, when Harley Quinn addresses Nightwing about that topic with the words: "It's funny. I always kinda thought you and Batman didn’t like girls. [...] You know. That book. With the headlights and the eyeball-gouging? I had to write a paper on it in college. Got a B minus".

== Interpretations in later years; parody and fandom ==
Homosexual interpretations of Batman and Robin have attracted even more attention during the Modern Age of Comic Books, as sexual and LGBT themes became more common and accepted in mainstream comics.

Writer Warren Ellis addressed the issue of Batman's sexuality obliquely in his comic book The Authority from Image Comics where he portrayed the character of the Midnighter, a clear Batman pastiche, as openly gay and engaged in a long term relationship with the Superman analogue Apollo.

The Ambiguously Gay Duo is a 1996 animated parody previously featured on The Dana Carvey Show and Saturday Night Live, with many similarities to Batman, not least the animated title sequence of the 1960s TV series.

In 2000, DC Comics refused to allow permission for the reprinting of four panels (from Batman #79, 92, 105 and 139) to illustrate Christopher York's paper All in the Family: Homophobia and Batman Comics in the 1950s.

The idea of the "gay Batman" has also been revitalized around 2005, as a montage of panels from "The Joker's Comedy of Errors" in Batman #66, issued in 1951, began to circulate as a joke. The episode used the word "boner" several times; in the original comic, it meant "blunder", but in present-day vernacular the word is primarily the slang term for an erection. A similar case of an unintended gay interpretation was the Rainbow Batman from 1957.

In the summer of 2005, painter Mark Chamberlain displayed a number of watercolors depicting both Batman and Robin in suggestive and sexually explicit poses. DC threatened both artist and the Kathleen Cullen Fine Arts gallery with legal action if they did not cease selling the works and demanded all remaining art, as well as any profits derived from them.

Will Brooker argues in Batman Unmasked: Analyzing a Cultural Icon, that a queer reading of Batman is a valid interpretation, and that homosexual readers would naturally find themselves drawn to the lifestyle depicted within, whether the character of Bruce Wayne himself is explicitly homosexual or not. He also identifies a homophobic element to the vigour with which mainstream fandom rejects the possibility of a homosexual reading of the character. Writing for The Guardian, Brooker expanded on this theme, stating that Batman:

... can never be tied down to any one identity. Batman has been a ridiculous boy-scout, a fearsome vigilante, a protective father, a loner, a clown. Batman is a myth and a mosaic, an icon who catches the light at different angles at different times, and takes multiple forms. But gayness – from high camp to intense homoeroticism – is an important aspect of that icon...The constant need to insist on Batman's heterosexuality always, unwittingly, reminds us of the campy incarnations as it tries to repress them; and the harder the push towards "darkness", the more the "rainbow Batman" sneaks through the gaps.

== LGBT characters in the Batman franchise ==
Several characters, mostly women, have been portrayed as lesbian or bisexual in the recent history of the franchise.

=== Female characters ===
==== Lesbian ====
In 2006, DC drew widespread media attention by announcing a new, lesbian incarnation of the well-known character Batwoman, alongside other lesbian characters such as Gotham City police officer Renee Montoya, police captain Maggie Sawyer, and Catwoman's protégée (and, for a time, successor as Catwoman) Holly Robinson, already existed in the Batman franchise.

In response to the 2009 New York Comic Con, reporter Alison Flood called Batwoman DC Comics' highest profile gay superhero. Batwoman appeared in a new Justice League comic book written by James Robinson and took over as the lead character in Detective Comics starting issue #854.

Greg Rucka said that DC's editors had no problem with his writing Montoya or Batwoman as lesbian, but the media controversy over Batwoman's sexuality "nullified any positive effect Batwoman might have had on the industry" and forced the character into minor roles during major crossover storylines. This changed in September 2011, when, as part of a company wide relaunch of their superhero titles, DC launched a Batwoman monthly title starring Kate Kane.

Ironically, the original Batwoman, Katherine Kane, was created in the 1950s, along with original Bat-girl Bette Kane, as a romantic interest for Batman (and Bat-girl as such for Robin), to deter the notion that Batman and Robin were both gay and in a relationship. Additionally, the Batwoman characters, sharing a last name, have been written to be related.

==== Bisexual ====
In 2011, during The New 52, DC introduced Alysia Yeoh, Barbara Gordon / Batgirl's roommate and friend who is a bisexual trans woman. A few months later in 2012, Harper Row would be introduced; she would go on to become Batman's sidekick and don the moniker Bluebird, and is also a bisexual woman.

In 2015, it was revealed that Selina Kyle is bisexual in Catwoman #39, written by Genevieve Valentine, in which she kissed Eiko, her replacement as Catwoman. Harley Quinn is bisexual and has been in a relationship with The Joker, and, more recently, in a non-monogamous relationship with Poison Ivy.

Other characters have been portrayed as bisexual in Batman media adaptations. Gotham's Barbara Kean and Tabitha Galavan are also confirmed to be bisexual. Barbara had had a relationship with Renee Montoya in the past, and she has also been in a love triangle including Tabitha.

=== Male characters ===
==== Bisexual ====
In a July 2011 Comic Vine interview, Judd Winick (Note: Winick wrote the "Under the Hood" (2005–06) story arc that saw Jason Todd resurrected as the Red Hood, and the miniseries Red Hood: The Lost Days (2010).) was asked by staff member Sara Lima if Jason Todd is bisexual. In response, Winick stated that Jason's sexual encounter with Talia al Ghul was the first time he was ever in a relationship with someone. Winick also admitted that he was trying to dodge the question as there are certain things that he is prevented from discussing and "DC Comics doesn't like [him] talking about". Specifically, that DC Comics doesn't "like us [writers] talking about things like that [characters' non-heterosexual identities]". In Batman and Robin #25 (2011), when Jason is strip-searched naked by a group of male soldiers and told they would use technology to scan him, without touching his body, he complains, "You say that like it's a good thing". In a press release by DC Comics regarding the reveal that Tim Drake is bisexual, Alex Jaffe discussed the history of queer themes in comics and how the various wearers of the Robin mantle have often been interpreted as being queer, highlighting Jason's friendship with Roy Harper often being viewed as more than platonic.

Cavalier was secretly bisexual and involved in a relationship with fellow Batman foe, Captain Stingaree.

In Batman: The Telltale Series, and its sequel The Enemy Within, John Doe, an adaptation of The Joker, is seen commenting on the attractiveness of Bruce Wayne while also romantically pursuing Harley Quinn, and was confirmed to be bisexual in a Tumblr post from former Telltale Games director Kent Mudle. Bruce Wayne, depending on the player's choices can also be depicted as having some sort of love for John, but it is never explicitly specified as amorous, with the only romantic options in the game being women.

Batman's Golden Age villain-turned-antihero Catman was confirmed to be bisexual by writer Gail Simone, which was explored during the 2015 volume of Secret Six.

In Batman (vol. 3) #100 (2020), DC introduced Ghost-Maker, a new bisexual antihero revealed to have known Bruce while he was training to become Batman.

In 2021, DC published a storyline as part of Batman: Urban Legends in which the third Robin, Tim Drake, realises he has romantic feelings for both men and women, and begins dating his former schoolfriend Bernard Dowd.

In the 2022 Valentine's Day special, Strange Love Adventures #1, the Riddler is confirmed to have romantic feelings for both women — such as The Quiz, Miss Grantham, and Jasmin Shroff — as well as men, such as Antoine Moray from his college days. He was probably also in love with Batman, since on Valentine's Day he presents people he is or has been in love with a vase of dahlia, the last one he saved for the dinner for two that he made for him and Batman.

In the TV cartoon Harley Quinn, Bane, in a state of uncontrolled sexual arousal, was shown to be attracted to the sexy British actor Brett Goldstein, but in the same episode ended up dating with a professional dominatrix named Betty.

In Two-Face (2025) #1, Victor Zsasz considers his victims, male and female, to be his betrothed. He not only makes a cut in his own skin, but makes one in the skin of each victim as well, as if exchanging rings, "marrying" them in heavenly matrimony by the blade. He finds this romantic, and continues to "speak" to his dead "spouses" through the scars.

==== Gay ====
Homosexual male characters in Batman comics include Harper Row's brother Cullen Row and the superhero Midnighter. Midnighter originated as an alternative universe analogue of Batman in comics published by WildStorm, but became part of the mainstream DC Universe in September 2011 as a result of The New 52. Midnighter has appeared as a regular supporting character in titles featuring Dick Grayson, including Grayson and Nightwing.

Batwoman villain Wolf Spider is a homosexual man.

In the alternate reality of Earth 32, Batman (Lex Luthor) was confirmed to be in a romantic partnership with the Super-Martian, the amalgamation of Superman and Martian Manhunter from that reality, in Lex Luthor: Year of the Villain #1 (2019) by the author Jason Latour.

In the TV cartoon Harley Quinn, Clayface was shown to have an interest in men, and Riddler and Clock King were revealed to be a couple.

In Catwoman #60 (2023), Flamingo was shown flirting with a male ballet dancer.

In The Penguin #5 (2023), the mercenary and hitman Black Spider was revealed to have a boyfriend named Daniel.

==== Other ====
The television series Gotham depicts The Penguin (Oswald Cobblepot) as a queer man, a first among depictions of the character in other media.

In the 2020 graphic novel Gotham High, Alfred Pennyworth, Bruce Wayne's uncle in this story, is married to a man named John Pennyworth, from whom he received his last name when they married.

== See also ==
- LGBT themes in comics
- LGBT themes in American mainstream comics
- Chicken (gay slang)
- Chickenhawk (gay slang)
- Slash fiction
- The Ambiguously Gay Duo
