= The Great Grape Ape Show =

American animated television series

- Genre: Comedy
- Created by: William Hanna; Joseph Barbera
- Voices of: Bob Holt; Marty Ingels
- Theme music composer: Hoyt Curtin
- Composer: Hoyt Curtin
- Country of origin: United States
- Original language: English
- No. of seasons: 1
- No. of episodes: 16 (31 segments)

Production
- Executive producers: William Hanna; Joseph Barbera
- Running time: 20 minutes (10 minutes per segment)
- Production company: Hanna-Barbera Productions

Original release
- Network: ABC
- Release: September 6 – December 13, 1975

The Great Grape Ape Show is an American animated television series produced by Hanna-Barbera Productions and broadcast on ABC from September 6 to December 13, 1975, for 16 episodes. ABC continued to air it in reruns until 1978.

== Premise ==
The title character is The Great Grape Ape (voiced by Bob Holt), who is a 40 ft (12 m) tall purple gorilla with the mind of a child. His catch phrase is saying his name twice ("Grape Ape, Grape Ape") after anything anyone says, usually as a form of agreement or acknowledgement of what was said. He travels the countryside with his canine pal Beegle Beagle (voiced by Marty Ingels), whom he calls "Beegly Beagly".

Grape Ape's immense size tends to initially shock and frighten those unfamiliar with him, and his presence alone has often terrified people and animals, causing them to run off screaming invariably: "YEOW! A gorill-ill-ill-ill-la!". The only exception to this was the character Rosie O'Lady (voiced by Janet Waldo), who appeared in Episode 11, "The Indian Grape Call". When asked by Beagle why she did not yell in fear like everyone else did upon seeing Grape Ape, she simply said, "You've seen one 40-foot purple ape, you've seen them all". In "Ali Beagle and the Forty Grapes", a wooden city limits sign reacted to Grape Ape's presence (after "overhearing" that no one else had) by progressively displaying the "YEOW!" phrase, with Beegle reading aloud as the sign changed, unfolding additional segments for the several "ill[a]" syllables (after which it folded itself up and hopped away in fear).

Grape Ape and his friend Beegle Beagle usually ride around in a small yellow van driven by Beegle Beagle with Grape Ape sitting on the roof which can somehow support his weight. A recurring bit of business would be for him to "rev up" the tiny vehicle like a child with a friction toy, then hop aboard as the van would start on its way. Also, Grape Ape's steps would often bounce Beegle into the air, where his legs would keep walking without breaking stride.

Given his size, Grape Ape's sneezes were equivalent to a hurricane and when he cried which was sometimes when he was homesick for his family, his tears could cause flooding in areas. When he does wrong, he also famously says, "I'm sorry!", which is done so often Beegle Beagle knows when it is coming and sometimes says it along with him, though often in a playful way.

== Cast ==
- Bob Holt as Grape Ape
- Marty Ingels as Beegle Beagle

=== Additional ===
- Joan Gerber
- Virginia Gregg
- Bob Hastings
- Allan Melvin
- Don Messick
- Alan Oppenheimer
- Hal Smith
- John Stephenson
- Lurene Tuttle
- Lennie Weinrib
- Frank Welker
- Paul Winchell

== Broadcast history ==
The Great Grape Ape Show was broadcast in these following formats on ABC:

- The New Tom and Jerry/Grape Ape Show (September 6, 1975 – September 4, 1976, ABC Saturday 8:30-9:30 AM)
- The Tom and Jerry/Grape Ape/Mumbly Show (September 11, 1976 – November 27, 1976, ABC Saturday 8:00-9:00 AM) (reruns of Tom and Jerry and Grape Ape)
- The Great Grape Ape Show (September 11, 1977 – September 3, 1978, ABC Sunday 11:00-11:30 AM) (reruns)

The show was originally broadcast as a segment of Tom & Jerry/Grape Ape Show during the 1975–76 season; for the 1976–77 season, the show became Tom and Jerry/Grape Ape/Mumbly Show, and in 1977–78, The Great Grape Ape Show became its own half-hour show on Sunday mornings. Thirty-two 10-minute installments of Grape Ape were made; two were aired per 30-minute time-slot.

Grape Ape also appeared as a member of "The Yogi Yahooeys" team on Scooby's All-Star Laff-A-Lympics from 1977 to 1979 and would often team up with Yakky Doodle in sporting competitions. In Britain, the BBC ran The Great Grape Ape with the cartoon series Bailey's Comets during 1977–78. The Tom & Jerry Show also appeared elsewhere in the BBC schedules, whereas the other part of the U.S. Saturday fare, Mumbly was shown by ITV.

Like many animated series created by Hanna-Barbera in the 1970s, the show contained a laugh track created by the studio.

== Episodes ==
No.	Title	Original release date	Prod. code
1a	"That Was No Idol, That Was My Ape"	September 6, 1975	79-2
Grape Ape and Beegle Beagle travel to an island where the idol worshipped by the natives resembles Grape Ape.
1b	"The All-American Ape"	September 6, 1975	79-1
Grape Ape joins a football team.
2a	"Movie Madness"	September 13, 1975	79-3
When a 40-foot mechanical ape malfunctions on set, the movie director hires Grape Ape as its replacement.
2b	"Trouble at Bad Rock"	September 13, 1975	79-4
A deputized Grape Ape helps capture a wanted criminal.
3a	"Flying Saucery"	September 20, 1975	79-5
Grape Ape and Beegle Beagle get abducted by aliens.
3b	"There's No Feud Like an Old Feud"	September 20, 1975	79-6
Grape Ape and Beegle Beagle get involved in a countryside family feud.
4a	"The Grape Race"	September 27, 1975	79-7
Grape Ape and Beegle Beagle enter The Really Grand Prix, a car race with a prize of $50,000.
4b	"The Big Parade"	September 27, 1975	79-8
Grape Ape inadvertently foils a jewel heist when he falls in love with a parade balloon used as part of the heist.
5a	"A Knight to Remember"	October 4, 1975	79-9
Grape Ape and Beegle Beagle travel back in time to the year 1075, where they fight a dragon after being knighted.
5b	"S.P.L.A.T."	October 4, 1975	79-10
After Fort Knox is robbed by Dr. Dolottle and his incredible animal mob, the police hire Grape Ape and Beegle Beagle as part of their Special Police-Licensed Animal Team to catch the culprit.
6a	"G.I. Ape"	October 11, 1975	79-11
Grape Ape and Beegle Beagle are tricked into joining the army.
6b	"The Purple Avenger"	October 11, 1975	79-12
Grape Ape dons the disguise of a local vigilante named The Purple Avenger to rid a Bulgarian town of its oppressive ruler.
7a	"Grapefinger"	October 18, 1975	79-13
Beegle Beagle visits his farmer cousin Bon Bon Beagle in France only to find that all of his grape crop was stolen by a villain named Grapefinger. He and Grape Ape set out to catch the culprit and get the grapes back.
7b	"Return to Balaboomba"	October 18, 1975	79-21
After Beegle Beagle takes a homesick Grape Ape back to his native Balaboomba to pay his parents a visit, the duo run into Bring'em Back Bogie, an animal collector obsessed with capturing Grape Ape and his parents.
8a	"Amazon Ape"	October 25, 1975	79-15
Beegle Beagle and Grape Ape journey to Brazil, where they end up joining a stranger's search for The Lost City.
8b	"Grape Marks the Spot"	October 25, 1975	79-16
Beegle Beagle and Grape Ape go treasure hunting after finding a treasure map inside a bottle. Unbeknownst to them, a local pirate is also after the same treasure.
9a	"The Invisible Ape"	November 1, 1975	79-18
Grape Ape inadvertently becomes invisible after trying a new experimental soap. The duo must now prevent thieves from misusing the soap for evil.
9b	"Public Grape No. 1"	November 1, 1975	79-19
A Beegle Beagle doppelganger, hired by the infamous international thief Da Pinci, tricks Grape Ape into stealing national monuments.
10a	"The Incredible Shrinking Grape"	November 8, 1975	79-17
A pigeon inadvertently drops an experimental chemical on Grape Ape, shrinking him down to the size of a mouse. A ringmaster takes advantage of this and abducts Grape Ape for his own circus show.
10b	"What's a Nice Prince Like You Doing in a Duck Like That?"	November 8, 1975	79-22
Grape Ape and Beegle Beagle help turn a cursed duck back into a prince so he can marry his beloved.
11a	"Who's New at the Zoo"	November 15, 1975	79-14
Bring'em Back Bogie is back trying to capture Grape Ape again using his parents as bait.
11b	"The Indian Grape Call"	November 15, 1975	79-24
Grape Ape and Beegle Beagle, dressed as Canadian Mounties, protect Rosie O'Lady from the villainous Bart Blackheart (parodies of Penelope Pitstop and Dick Dastardly respectively).
12a	"A Grape Is Born"	November 22, 1975	79-23
After Grape Ape stubs his toe and accidentally invents a new dance move, an agent named Al Gimme moves quickly to sign him. This ends in disaster as Grape Ape gets stage fright and freezes up in front of a national audience.
12b	"The First Grape in Space"	November 22, 1975	79-25
Grape Ape and Beegle Beagle get hired as astronauts and go through astronaut training at a space centre.
13	"S.P.L.A.T.'s Back"	November 27, 1975	79-20 79-26
Part 1: The Chicken has been training birds to steal goods. Grape Ape and Beegle Beagle are assigned to the case. They trace the villain to a bird sanctuary, but only meet a human birdkeeper. After the Chicken kidnaps the Chief, Beegle and Grape Ape disguise themselves as a bird and tree, respectively. The Chicken orders his newest "recruit" to chop down the tree and take care of the Chief. Part 2: Beegle, disguised as Big Bad Bird, pretends to follow the Chicken's orders. The Chicken heads out to sea, along with his birds, while Grape Ape secretly follows them underwater. Eventually, Beegle reveals that the birds were merely controlled by a whistle. As for the Chicken, he turns out to be the birdkeeper in disguise.
14a	"To Sleep or Not to Sleep"	November 29, 1975	79-27
Grape Ape showcases his talent on national television by tightroping The Grand Canyon while asleep after discovering said talent while taking a nap.
14b	"Olympic Grape"	November 29, 1975	79-28
After the United States olympic team is snowed in, Grape Ape offers to take their place and ends up competing against Krodnic, a robotic competitor from Evilonia.
15a	"Ali Beagle and the 40 Grapes"	December 6, 1975	79-29
Grape Ape and Beegle Beagle journey east to Richipoor, where they help the local Wazir recover his stolen magic lamp.
15b	"Grape Five-O"	December 6, 1975	79-31
Grape Ape and Beegle Beagle stop Mr. Y, an island collector, from stealing all of the world's islands.
16a	"The Purple Avenger Strikes Again"	December 13, 1975	79-30
The town of Dumpnograd once again welcomes Beegle Beagle and Grape Ape (dressed as The Purple Avenger), who promise to rid the town of its oppressive ruler, Baron Nogoodnik. The duo, however, end up getting chased out of town by the locals when the Baron and his aide frame The Purple Avenger by dressing up as the same and going on a crime spree.
16b	"The Grape Connection"	December 13, 1975	79-32
When The Reallibeeg Ruby is stolen from The Bonjour Museum, Grape Ape and Beegle Beagle are hired to get the jewel back from the jewel thief.

* Telecast at Noon (EST), Thursday afternoon, November 27, 1975, as part of ABC's Thanksgiving Funshine Festival.

== Home media ==
The episodes "That Was No Idol, That Was My Ape" and "The All-American Ape" are available on the DVD Saturday Morning Cartoons 1970's Vol. 2.

== Media adaptations ==
Norbert Fersen adapted the TV show into a comic strip in the 1970s, under its French-translated name Momo et Ursul.

== Other appearances ==
- Grape Ape had his own short-lived comic book series called The Great Grape Ape that ran 2 issues in September and November 1976 published by Charlton Comics. He also appeared in Laff-A-Lympics #1 to #11 and #13 as well as Hanna-Barbera TV Stars #1. Both titles were published by Marvel Comics in 1978–79. He also appeared in Hanna-Barbera Presents #6 published by Archie Comics in 1996. Outside of these American comics, Grape Ape was featured in three annual comics published in England from 1978 through 1980.
- Grape Ape appeared in the Laff-A-Lympics segment as part of "The Yogi Yahooeys" team on Scooby's All-Star Laff-A-Lympics / Scooby's All-Stars (1977–79). His size varies on the show, sometimes being his normal 40 ft. and other times about 6–10 feet depending on the scene.
- Grape Ape made a cameo appearance in the Yogi's Space Race (1978) episode "Nebuloc–The Prehistoric Planet".
- In the Dexter's Laboratory episode "Chubby Cheese", Grape Ape (voiced by Jeff Bennett) was among the animatronic Hanna-Barbera characters in the animatronic show as he closes out Chubby's song.
- Grape Ape also made a cameo in an episode of The Grim Adventures of Billy & Mandy called "Giant Billy and Mandy All-Out Attack".
- Grape Ape was featured in the episode "Grape Juiced" of Harvey Birdman, Attorney at Law with Grape Ape voiced by John Michael Higgins and Beegle Beagle voiced by Doug Preis.
- In Episode 539 of Saturday Night Live that was hosted by Queen Latifah, the TV Funhouse segment The X-Presidents featured Grape Ape (voiced by Robert Smigel). In a Pro-War propaganda cartoon that Ronald Reagan shows to Gerald Ford, Jimmy Carter, and George H.W. Bush, Grape Ape was shown taking part in the Invasion of Grenada where he scares the big-toothed Grenada soldier into hiding in a log as a skunk (which was previously seen in a Bugs Bunny cartoon about the Korean War) says "P.U." When Gerald Ford asks "Who's Grape Ape", Ronald Reagan quotes "He had a show. We were saving The Smurfs for Nicaragua."
- In the Robot Chicken episode "I'm Trapped", Grape Ape is seen dead and a crowd of policemen are around his body where they realize that they did not hear the G in his name, which would explain why they shot him.
- Grape Ape made a cameo in the Mad segment "Demise of the Planet of the Apes", where he is one of the occupants of the Super Ape Motel.
- Grape Ape and Beegle Beagle make a cameo in a 2012 MetLife commercial entitled "Everyone".
- Grape Ape was mentioned on the October 1, 2014 episode of The Tonight Show Starring Jimmy Fallon, during his "Audience Suggestion Box" segment. Bystanders were asked in Times Square to name as many animals as possible in a few seconds, and one mustachioed man answered "grape." When asked why, he stated "I was thinking about Grape Ape."
- Grape Ape appeared in Brak Presents the Brak Show Starring Brak, voiced by Dave Willis.
- Grape Ape had a cameo on Cartoon Planet episode 10 "Tom Foolery".
- Grape Ape and Beegle Beagle appeared in DC Comics Nightwing/Magilla Gorilla Special #1.
- Grape Ape appears in the end credits of Scoob! He appears as a new recruit of the Falcon Force, a new team made by the Blue Falcon.
- Grape Ape has appeared in multiple episodes of Jellystone! voiced by C.H. Greenblatt. This version lives near Jellystone. In "Jellystone: The Boardgame", he comes Jellystone's Director of Moving Large Objects.
- Grape Ape and Beegle Beagle appeared in the 2021 special Scooby-Doo, Where Are You Now!
- Grape Ape appeared in the Teen Titans Go! episode "Warner Bros. 100th Anniversary".

== In other languages ==
- French: Momo et Ursul
- Italian: Gorilla Lilla
- Persian: Gouril Angouri گوریل انگوری
- Portuguese: João Grandão
- Spanish: Simiolón y Listolín

== See also ==
- List of fictional primates
