= Coney Island Baby (film) =

2003 film directed by Amy Hobby

Coney Island Baby is a 2003 comedy-drama in which film producer Amy Hobby made her directorial debut. Karl Geary wrote the film and Tanya Ryno was the film's producer. The music was composed by Ryan Shore. The film was shot in Sligo, Ireland, which is known locally as "Coney Island".

The film was screened at the Newport International Film Festival. Hobby won the Jury Award for "Best First Time Director".

The film made its premiere television broadcast on the Sundance Channel.

== Plot ==
After spending time in New York City, Billy Hayes returns to his hometown. He wants to get back together with his ex-girlfriend and take her back to America in hopes of opening up a gas station. But everything isn't going Billy's way - the townspeople aren't happy to see him, and his ex-girlfriend is engaged and pregnant. Then, Billy runs into his old friends who are planning a scam.

== Cast ==
- Karl Geary as Billy Hayes
- Laura Fraser as Bridget
- Hugh O'Conor as Satchmo
- Andy Nyman as Franko
- Patrick Fitzgerald as The Duke
- Tom Hickey as Mr. Hayes
- Conor McDermottroe as Gerry
- David McEvoy as Joe
- Thor McVeigh as Magician
- Sinead Dolan as Julia

== Music ==
The film's original score was composed by Ryan Shore.
