= Joe Sedelmaier =

American advertising film director (1933–2026)

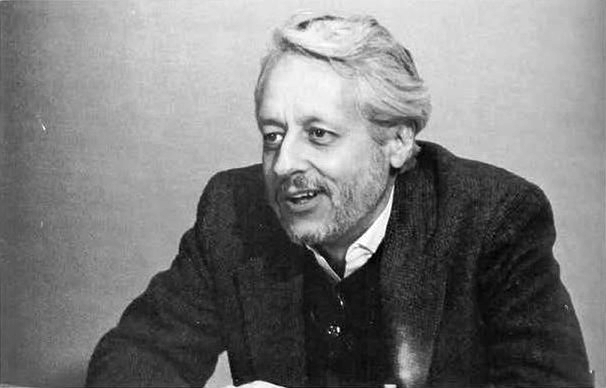
- Sedelmaier in 1986
- Born: John Josef Sedelmaier; May 31, 1933; Orrville, Ohio, U.S.
- Died: May 8, 2026 (aged 92); Chicago, Illinois, U.S.
- Occupations: Film director and producer
- Children: 3

John Josef Sedelmaier (May 31, 1933 – May 8, 2026) was an American film director known for his work in television advertising. His work included FedEx's "Fast Talking Man" and the Wendy's "Where's the Beef?" ads.

Sedelmaier contended, "A commercial is something you watch when you sit down to watch something else—you should at least be entertained."

"Beginning in the 1970s, Sedelmaier, a former art director at Young & Rubicam and J. Walter Thompson, gained notice for fundamentally changing the way television spots were cast and filmed—replacing the actors who seemed like plastic, too perfect mannequins with offbeat people like Clara Peller. He directed them in a manner doing for television advertising what directors like Preston Sturges did for Hollywood comedies."—Stuart Elliott, New York Times

Sedelmaier was profiled in a cover story in Esquire magazine in 1983 and featured in a segment on "60 Minutes" in 1984.

His commercial work garnered multiple Clio awards, Cannes Golden Lion Awards, and numerous awards for the One Show, the Art Directors Club of New York, Communication Arts, Britain's D&AD, and the Hollywood MBA. In 2000 he was inducted into the Art Directors Club of New York Hall of Fame. In 2016 he was inducted into the American Advertising Federation Advertising Hall of Fame. His film "OpenMinds" was an official selection at the 2003 Sundance Film Festival.

Sedelmaier was born in Ohio, but moved to Chicago, Illinois for school. He married twice and had three children: two sons, including animator J. J. Sedelmaier, and a daughter. He died in Chicago on May 8, 2026, at the age of 92.
