= J. J. Sedelmaier =

American animator

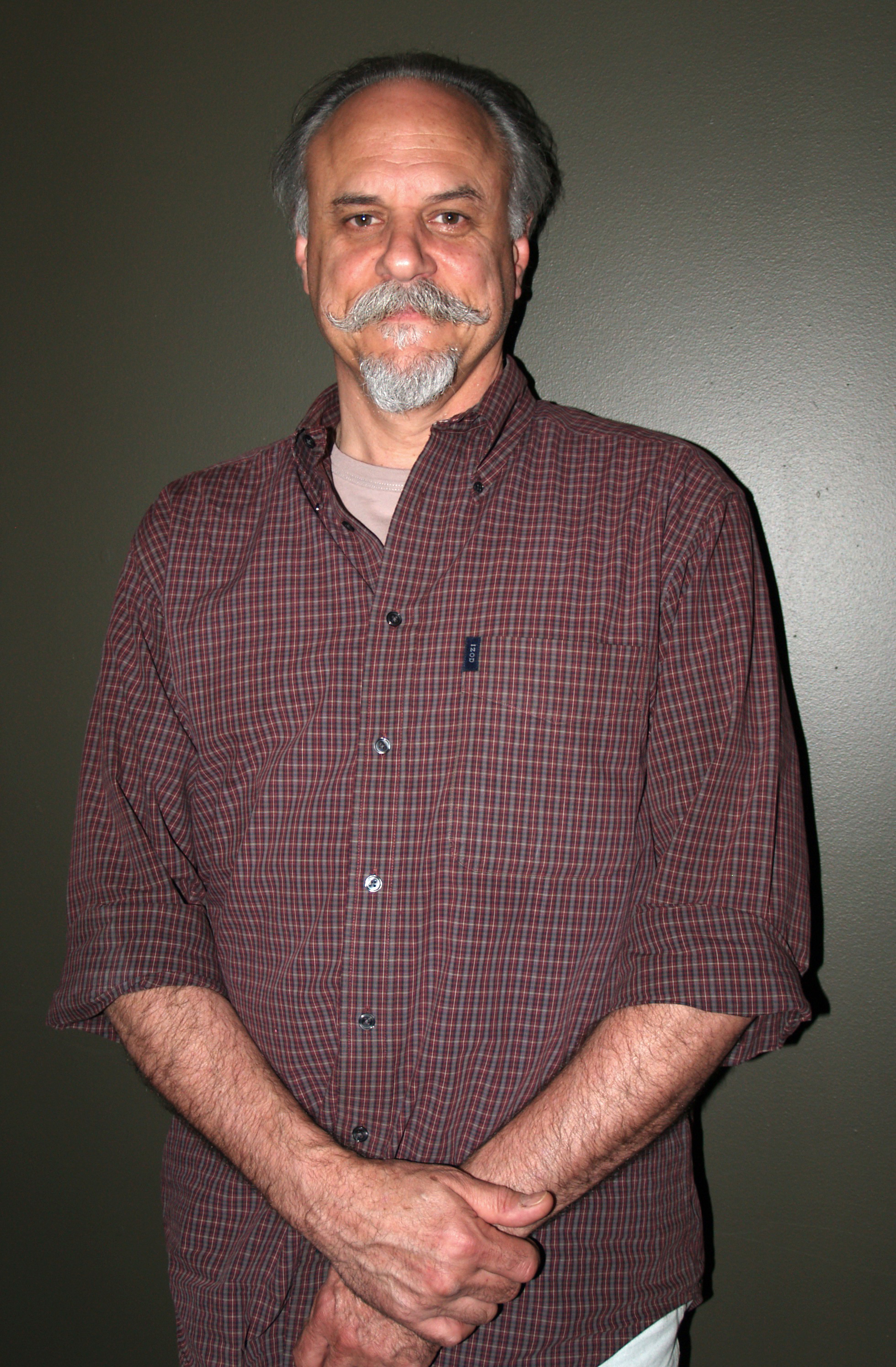
- Sedelmaier at a September 16, 2013 Tom Sito lecture and book signing at the SVA Theatre in Manhattan
- Born: March 11, 1956 (age 70); Chicago, Illinois
- Known for: Animation
- Notable work: Beavis and Butt-Head; The Ambiguously Gay Duo; Tek Jansen; Psych

J. J. Sedelmaier (born March 12, 1956) is an American animator, illustrator, designer, author and film director/producer, known for co-creating (with Robert Smigel) the "Saturday TV Funhouse" segment—including The Ambiguously Gay Duo and The X-Presidents—on the TV series Saturday Night Live; as well as the Tek Jansen series on The Colbert Report, the interstitial cartoons seen in the USA TV series Psych, and over 500 other TV and advertising projects.

== Early life ==
J. J. Sedelmaier's father is Joe Sedelmaier, a retired director and producer of TV commercials. His mother was artist/designer Maria Svolos (1937–2014).

== Career ==
Sedelmaier and his wife Patrice run J. J. Sedelmaier Productions, Inc., a multiple award-winning animation/graphic design studio they established in 1990 in White Plains, New York, to create and produce animated television commercials utilizing print illustrators as designers – an approach they continue to this day. He began his career in animation on cartoon television specials such as Strawberry Shortcake in Big Apple City (1981), The Berenstain Bears' Valentine Special (1982), and Berenstain Bears' Littlest Leaguer (1983). Between 1984 and 1990 Sedelmaier worked with R. O. Blechman at The Ink Tank in New York City. His studio's long-form creations, which are often parody-oriented, include animation for Saturday TV Funhouse on Saturday Night Live, the pilot episode of Harvey Birdman, Attorney at Law, the Tek Jansen series for The Colbert Report, and a series of interstitial cartoons for the USA/NBC live action series Psych, along with advertising campaigns of live-action/CGI commercials for Alka-Seltzer resurrecting the classic Speedy Alka-Seltzer character, and "Scrubbing Bubbles" for S.C. Johnson. Sedelmaier collaborated with Robert Smigel on creating The Ambiguously Gay Duo, The X-Presidents, and the Fun with Real Audio cartoons for SNL. Sedelmaier personally designed the AGD characters, Ace & Gary. Stuart Hill was his collaborator on the Captain Linger series of interstitials for Turner Broadcasting's Cartoon Network. JJSP also launched the first and second season of the MTV series Beavis and Butt-Head series in 1993.

Sedelmaier, along with Turner network executive Betty Cohen, graphic design guru Tom Corey and producer Tom Pomposello, also produced an in-house sales tape within Turner Broadcasting that presented the concept of Cartoon Network. Soon thereafter, Nickelodeon requested J. J. Sedelmaier's services to design, animate, and produce the package of network ID's that were used to inaugurate their Nicktoons and Nick at Nite blocks. This also included the Nicktoons logo design and the opening and closing sequence used for the block. In 1991, J. J. Sedelmaier created two IDs for MTV. Immediately working on Beavis and Butt-Head a year later, the studio animated three new episodes for the reintroduction of the educational Schoolhouse Rock! series for ABC. Sedelmaier was also co-creator of Cartoon Network's Sunday Pants with Craig "Sven" Gordon and Stuart Hill.

As an author, Sedelmaier has contributed to numerous articles for Print Magazine and its Imprint blog, as well as books by Steven Heller, Spencer Drate, David Levy, Maureen Furniss, and Paul Wells. He has spoken and organized screenings at schools and universities throughout the United States and is a regular presenter at both the New York and Chicago Comic-Cons. J.J. has also curated exhibitions at the Westchester Arts Council in White Plains, New York, and at the Grohmann Museum in Milwaukee, Wisconsin.

== Awards ==
J.J. Sedelmaier and J.J. Sedelmaier Productions, Inc's animated productions have received 2 Emmy Award statuettes for Boston Bruins/Arnold Worldwide advertising at the 2016 New England Emmy Awards, a contributing writing honor in the 2001–02 Primetime Emmy for Saturday Night Live, and a 1997 Daytime Emmy nomination for Schoolhouse Rock. Other industry accolades include: Annie Award, Annecy Festival Award, Ottawa International Animation Festival, Art Directors Club Awards, Society Of Illustrators, American Illustration, New York International Film & TV, BDA Awards, Gracie Award, Telly Awards, Promax Award,
