= The X-Presidents =

American TV cartoon series

The X-Presidents is an NBC/Saturday Night Live Saturday TV Funhouse cartoon created by Robert Smigel and animated by J. J. Sedelmaier Productions. It focuses on a superhero team consisting of former American Presidents Gerald Ford, Jimmy Carter, Ronald Reagan, and George H. W. Bush. The cartoon lasted from 1997 to 2004.

== Plot ==
This cartoon features the four former American Presidents who were still alive in 1997 — Gerald Ford, Jimmy Carter, Ronald Reagan, and George H. W. Bush (all of whom were voiced by Jim Morris) — as a superhero team. This recurring sketch debuted on January 11, 1997, and a total of nine installments were produced between 1997 and 2004. The four former leaders were endowed with superpowers when struck by lightning at a celebrity golf tournament. The title is a play on words, both referencing that the members are ex-Presidents, and alluding to the Marvel Comics franchise, X-Men. Bill Clinton, who doesn't have superpowers, also occasionally aids the group. Their wives are also members of a similar group, The X-First Ladies, with more flamboyant powers.

In the episode "Nixon," Richard Nixon and his dog Checkers are resurrected to aid the group. In the episode "The Hunt for Osama", Bob Dole, the Republican presidential candidate in the 1996 election and vice presidential candidate in the 1976 election, is shown as the butler of the group's headquarters, asking if he can join the group in hunting down Osama bin Laden, to which Reagan says "Dole, just be glad we let you be butler."

The episode "Propaganda" features Tom Kenny reprising his role as SpongeBob SquarePants who is roped in by the group to make a pro-Iraq War propaganda cartoon, only to be put off by the racist and vulgar content. George W. Bush also appears at the beginning and end of the episode while Dick Cheney makes a cameo appearance.

The cartoons end with the X-Presidents singing a song that recounts the episode's message. The Ambiguously Gay Duo, another series of shorts created by Robert Smigel and J. J. Sedelmaier, made a special guest appearance in The X-Presidents episode "The Hunt for Osama". The sketch broadly parodies Hanna-Barbera/Filmation cartoons from the 1970s.

In 2006, Smigel said he had written a script for a X-Presidents film with Adam McKay.

== Comic adaptation ==
The cartoon short was adapted to a graphic novel by Random House Books.
