= The Late Shift (book) =

1994 book by Bill Carter

- Book cover
- Author: Bill Carter
- Language: English
- Publisher: Hyperion
- Publication date: 1994
- Publication place: United States
- Pages: 299
- ISBN: 978-1-56282-754-0
- Followed by: The War for Late Night

The Late Shift: Letterman, Leno, and the Network Battle for the Night is a 1994 non-fiction book written by The New York Times media reporter Bill Carter. It chronicles the early 1990s conflict surrounding the American late-night talk show The Tonight Show. The book was later made into a film of the same name by HBO.

== Contents ==
The book chronicles the behind-the-scenes corporate battle surrounding American late-night talk shows, leading up to, and after, Johnny Carson's 1992 retirement as host of NBC's The Tonight Show. The book primarily details the power struggle between David Letterman and Jay Leno to succeed Carson as the "King of Late Night", NBC choosing Leno over Letterman as the next Tonight Show host, and Letterman later moving to rival network CBS.

== Cast of characters ==
The following is a partial list of people featured in the book:

Major principals

- Johnny Carson: Host of The Tonight Show from 1962 to 1992.
- Jay Leno: Permanent guest host of The Tonight Show since 1987. Chosen by NBC to succeed Carson as host.
- David Letterman: Host of NBC's 12:30am show Late Night with David Letterman since 1982. After being bypassed as Carson's successor in favor of Leno, moves to rival network CBS in 1993.

Others

- Helen Kushnick: Leno's tough manager who helps him secure his spot as Carson's successor. Becomes executive producer of The Tonight Show with Jay Leno, but her fierce tactics eventually force both NBC and Leno to fire her.
- Peter Lassally: Executive producer of The Tonight Show Starring Johnny Carson and later Late Night with David Letterman. Becomes an unofficial counselor to Letterman after Leno is selected to succeed Carson.
- Michael Ovitz: Head of the Creative Artists Agency from 1975 to 1995. Hired by Letterman to negotiate his move from NBC to another network, studio, or syndicator (eventually CBS).
- Howard Stringer: President of CBS from 1988 to 1995. After several unsuccessful attempts to break NBC's ratings stranglehold on the late night hours, negotiates to bring Letterman to his network.
- Brandon Tartikoff: President of NBC's entertainment division from 1981 to 1991. Instrumental in helping to build NBC's 1980s late night lineup of Carson and Letterman, as well as signing Leno to be Carson's permanent guest host in 1987.
- Bob Wright: President of NBC from 1986 to 2007. Tries to negotiate to keep Letterman on NBC.
- John Agoglia: NBC executive from 1980 to 1998 and supporter of Leno.

== Reception ==
In a review of The Late Shift for The New York Times Book Review, Jon Katz wrote, "[This] is a reporter's book, unfailingly balanced, thoroughly researched, filled with scoops and fresh details. Even though CBS's wooing and winning of Mr. Letterman was the subject of enormous publicity, Mr. Carter's book makes clear that we knew less than we thought about what was really going on." Katz criticized the book for not going into more depth about Letterman's switch to CBS, writing, "As readable as it is, 'The Late Shift' needed to take a more critical, detached look at the long-term significance of Mr. Letterman's move. A number of questions are not addressed." He concluded, "'The Late Shift' is nonetheless a powerful story, and ultimately a sad one, filled with casualties as well as winners. Mr. Leno, who has been made to seem a second choice by the very people who elevated him, has been betrayed by his employers in the most basic of ways, and he has not yet recovered."

Kim Campbell reviewed the book for The Christian Science Monitor. "More than just a play-by-play account of the actions that followed Johnny Carson's 1991 retirement announcement, Carter's well-written book is a look at the history of the late-night franchise, and of the men who host the shows that we would rather watch instead of going to bed." Campbell described the book as revealing in its assessment of NBC's decision to pass over Letterman for The Tonight Show, concluding, "Carter's eye-opening book leaves the impression that NBC will be remembered more for its loss of Letterman, than for its role as creator of late-night television."

== Lawsuit ==
Helen Kushnick, Jay Leno's manager at the time of Carson's retirement who was pushed out following her heavy-handed tactics, filed a $30 million lawsuit against Bill Carter, claiming libel. Specifically, her case related to a claim that she planted a story about Carson's retirement in a New York City tabloid. The then-pending lawsuit was noted in the closing credits of the film, as the Broadway tune "There's No Business Like Show Business" plays. The lawsuit settled out of court for an undisclosed sum; Kushnick died of cancer in August 1996.

== Film adaptation ==
A film adaption of the book was produced in 1996 by HBO, directed by Betty Thomas, and starring John Michael Higgins as Letterman and Daniel Roebuck as Leno. The film received seven Emmy Award nominations in categories including "Outstanding Made for Television Movie", makeup, casting, writing, and directing, acting. For her role in the film as Helen Kushnick, actress Kathy Bates won awards from the American Comedy Awards, the Golden Globe Awards, the Satellite Awards, and the Screen Actors Guild Awards. The film was recognized with an award for "Outstanding Directorial Achievement in Dramatic Specials" from the Directors Guild of America Awards.

== Sequel ==
A sequel to The Late Shift called The War for Late Night, based on the controversy involving Jay Leno, Conan O'Brien, The Tonight Show and NBC was released on November 4, 2010.
