= The War for Late Night =

Book by Bill Carter

- Book cover
- Author: Bill Carter
- Language: English
- Publisher: Viking
- Publication date: November 4, 2010
- Publication place: United States
- Media type: Hardcover
- Pages: 384
- ISBN: 978-0-670-02208-3
- Preceded by: The Late Shift

The War for Late Night: When Leno Went Early and Television Went Crazy is a 2010 non-fiction book written by The New York Times media reporter Bill Carter. It chronicles the 2010 late-night show conflict surrounding the The Tonight Show involving Conan O'Brien and Jay Leno. It is a sequel to Carter's 1994 book The Late Shift, which detailed the struggle for the hosting spot on The Tonight Show between David Letterman and Jay Leno in the early 1990s following the retirement of Johnny Carson. It was first published on November 4, 2010, by Viking Press.

The book received a generally favorable reception from reviewers including Associated Press, BusinessWeek, The Buffalo News, New York Magazine, Star Tribune, The Hollywood Reporter, The Washington Post, Entertainment Weekly, New York Post, Los Angeles Times, Time, and ABC News. The Las Vegas Review-Journal said, "The War for Late Night ... offers an exhaustive, eye-opening, how-could-he-possibly-know-that look at the late-night feud that ultimately was a muddled victory for Leno: He won back The Tonight Show, but his ratings have fallen below O'Brien's."

== Background ==
Author Bill Carter previously wrote The Late Shift, a book about the 1991–92 conflict between Jay Leno and David Letterman to decide who would succeed Johnny Carson as host of The Tonight Show. The book was well received by critics from publications including The New York Times Book Review, and The Christian Science Monitor.

== Research ==
Carter researched for the book during 2010. He had secured a publishing deal for the book by January of that year. Carter confirmed to Gillian Reagan of Business Insider that in his research, he tried to gather information from multiple viewpoints. He said, "I'm reaching out to everyone I possibly can to get every side of the story." Carter said that he was remaining neutral about the 2010 Tonight Show conflict. "I obviously have to reach out to all sides", he said. "For the longest time, I personally tried to watch as many episodes of all the shows as I could to get sense of each show, and what each guy does. I don't just pick one and stick with that guy." Carter researched the impact of financial decision-making on the controversy. He said he had known Leno for a long time, and O'Brien since he began working for NBC, and that these connections gave him the benefit of familiarity.

== Contents ==
The War for Late Night chronicles the 2010 conflict surrounding the American late-night talk show The Tonight Show involving Conan O'Brien and Jay Leno. Carter gives biographical description of other late-night television personalities, including David Letterman, Jimmy Fallon, Jimmy Kimmel, Craig Ferguson, Jon Stewart and Stephen Colbert. As host of Late Night with Conan O'Brien, O'Brien decided to remain with NBC after attempts by ABC and Fox to attract him to their networks—as NBC executives had told O'Brien that he would become host of The Tonight Show after Leno's retirement. While hosting The Tonight Show and analyzing ratings results, O'Brien told his manager Gavin Polone that he feared that Leno might be moved back to the program. Carter's book contains details of O'Brien's and Leno's contracts, and describes O'Brien's emotional state during the 2010 conflict. According to Carter, Leno had an advantage during negotiations because of a stronger contract agreement with NBC, which gave Leno the option to sue NBC if his program was canceled.

NBC executives tried to solve the problem so that both Leno and O'Brien would keep their jobs. Jeff Gaspin, the chairman of NBC Universal Television, instructed both parties that he did not wish to make a difficult decision but that the most appropriate solution was to move Leno back to his previous timeslot and push O'Brien to 12:05. Carter details a heated exchange between NBC executive Jeff Zucker and O'Brien's agent Rick Rosen during which Zucker told O'Brien's representatives he could enforce O'Brien's contract and "ice him for two years", after details of the conflict were leaked to the media. The author cites O'Brien's disappointment with the perceived unfairness of the situation, and quotes O'Brien's comments at a meeting with NBC Entertainment and Universal Media Studios chairman Marc Graboff and Jeff Gaspin, "I know how hard I worked for this. It was promised to me. I had a shitty lead-in." Carter recounts how affiliates of NBC complained to the network about the poor ratings performance of Leno's program The Jay Leno Show. O'Brien asked the two NBC executives, "What does Jay have on you? What does this guy have on you people? What the hell is it about Jay?"

Carter writes about how the "Team Coco" movement and fans impacted O'Brien following the controversy, "The outpouring of support made Conan feel as if he was starring in his own version of the movie It's a Wonderful Life, both because he was allowed to see a 'Tonight Show' where he never existed and because the support made him realize he really was 'the richest man in town.'" O'Brien was hurt by the fact that Leno did not communicate directly with him during the fiasco. Carter also says that compared to the eventual payout to O'Brien of $45 million, NBC would have suffered a financial loss of $235 million if O'Brien had left the company in 2004 to host a talk show for another network. O'Brien moved from NBC to host his own late night program on TBS. Carter's work concludes with an interview from comic Jerry Seinfeld, who favored Leno; Seinfeld argues that O'Brien should have remained at NBC.

== Reception ==
Writing for New York Post, Larry Getlen wrote, "Veteran journalist Bill Carter details the vicious recent battle over The Tonight Show, showing how Leno was hardly the devious schemer he was made out to be, and how O’Brien was not always the angelic innocent the media portrayed, as he and his team aggressively pursued the show at every opportunity." Jon Bershad of Mediaite commented, "It’s as tense and exciting as expected." Writing for TV Squad, Joel Keller analyzed Carter's comparison of Leno's legal contract with O'Brien's, and wrote that the author "paints a picture of Leno and his producer, Debbie Vickers, as pragmatists and Conan as a cockeyed idealist". Joe Flint of Los Angeles Times commented about changes in the media industry since Carter's prior book The Late Shift, "The only difference is that the media world has changed a lot then, and while The Late Shift had a lot of inside dirt and drama that was news to everyone but the most hardcore industry insiders, this time around the soap opera played out on TV and in the media." James Poniewozik of Time wrote, "There are lots of juicy bits, but the big takeaway: the guy with the best contract, wins", and called the book, "Bill Carter's Jaypocalypse dirt-disher". Writing for ABC News, journalist Sheila Marikar commented, "Bill Carter's new book, 'The War for Late Night,' reveals what happened behind the scenes, the expletives that were hurled during closed-door discussions, the roller coaster that O'Brien, Leno, and their cohorts rode during that tumultuous time."

"The War for Late Night ... offers an exhaustive, eye-opening, how-could-he-possibly-know-that look at the late-night feud that ultimately was a muddled victory for Leno: He won back 'The Tonight Show,' but his ratings have fallen below O'Brien's."

— Las Vegas Review-Journal

Frazier Moore of Associated Press wrote, "He plays this latest late-night conflagration right down the middle. He keeps the story moving almost cinematically, crosscutting from one personality to another, deftly and revealingly presenting different points of view." Writing for BusinessWeek, Jim Windolf gave the book a rating of three stars out of a possible five, and commented, "Bill Carter has become the Bob Woodward of the 11:35 time slot." Paula Duffy of HULIQ News described the book as "a juicy tell-all". Dylan Stableford of TheWrap called the book "a must-read" for fans of Conan O'Brien. Jeff Simon of The Buffalo News called the book a "definitive history" of the 2010 Tonight Show conflict. Willa Paskin wrote for New York Magazine that Carter, "spoke with enough people involved in the situation to provide an account so detailed, it even includes re-created conversations and dialogue". Neal Justin of Star Tribune commented on the author's neutrality in his writing style, "The next time network TV executives stumble into an ugly behind-the-scenes battle, they should consider hiring Bill Carter to negotiate. The veteran New York Times media reporter has a way of sharing juicy stories without painting anyone as a complete saint or sinner, a feat he pulls off again in his latest book, 'The War for Late Night: When Leno Went Early and Television Went Crazy'".

Nate Jones wrote for Time magazine, "There are no landmark surprises—Jay Leno comes off as affably opportunistic, Conan O'Brien as a tragic self-dramatist with a little bit of a martyrdom complex—but it's a worthwhile look at the procedural negotiations that led to last winter's messy divorce." The Hollywood Reporter said, "Bill Carter's book reveals explosive new details about the Jay Leno-O'Brien debacle." Kyle Anderson of MTV.com wrote, "the story takes an amazingly candid look at the conversations and arguments that went on behind the scenes. It even takes you to the moment when O'Brien decides that he has to walk away from 'The Tonight Show.'" Paul Schwartzman of The Washington Post wrote that it "is a great read and an example of narrative journalism's power when practiced by a reporter steeped in his subject matter." Lynette Rice of Entertainment Weekly gave Carter's book a rating of B−, and wrote, "In the end, Carter presents a pretty compelling argument that while the fourth-place network lost the public relations war, it probably won the late-night battle." Speaking on his program The Howard Stern Show, host Howard Stern said of Carter's writing style, "It is just endlessly fascinating the way he paints this picture."

== Film adaptation ==
On January 19, 2010, during O'Brien's last week of shows, guest Quentin Tarantino jokingly suggested that he direct a sequel to The Late Shift, cast O'Brien as himself and make it a revenge movie in the style of his film Kill Bill with the title Late Shift 2: The Rolling Thunder of Revenge. The Toronto Star reported in February 2010 that a sequel to The Late Shift film was in planning stages. In the final episode of The Tonight Show with Conan O'Brien, O'Brien said he wished that actress Tilda Swinton could portray him in the film, an idea in which Swinton subsequently expressed interest.

When asked in a June 2010 interview with Movieline about the prospects of a film adaptation, Carter responded in the negative, saying, "Not really. Nothing serious. Let's put it this way: There have always been people kicking it around because they think it's funny ... Letterman made a ... joke saying that Max von Sydow should play him. So, you know, people are just kicking it around like that." Actor Bob Balaban, who portrayed NBC executive Warren Littlefield in The Late Shift, said he would like to portray Jeff Zucker, and said Jason Alexander would also be a good choice to play Zucker. Andy Richter jokingly told Movieline that he would want Justin Bieber to portray him in a film adaptation of the book.

== See also ==
- 2010 Tonight Show conflict
- Conan
- Conan O'Brien Can't Stop
- Late Night with Conan O'Brien
- The Legally Prohibited from Being Funny on Television Tour
- The Tonight Show with Conan O'Brien
