= John Agoglia =

American television executive

John Joseph Agoglia (September 24, 1937 – March 14, 2014) was an American television executive noted for his work at NBC from 1980 to 1998, including a tenure as President of NBC Enterprises. He was considered one of the network's top negotiators, often heading complicated negotiations between NBC and producers, actors and television studios. Agoglia was instrumental in the decision to replace Johnny Carson, the departing host of The Tonight Show, with Jay Leno in 1992.

Agoglia was born in Brooklyn, New York. His career began at Barclays Bank, before switching to the television industry. He worked as an executive at CBS for sixteen years before joining rival NBC in 1980. Agoglia moved to southern California permanently when he took the position at NBC.

Agoglia worked directly under a string of well-known Presidents of NBC Entertainment and other executives, including Brandon Tartikoff, Warren Littlefield and Don Ohlmeyer. He earned a reputation as one of the network's toughest dealmakers. Agoglia led the often drawn-out negotiations with outside television studios and on-air talent. For example, Agoglia hammered out a deal with Paramount Studios for the renewal of Cheers. He also negotiated the agreement to retain three cast members of Seinfeld - Jason Alexander, Julia Louis-Dreyfus, and Michael Richards - when each actor was demanding one million dollars per episode at the peak of the show's popularity.

Agoglia played a significant role in the decision by NBC to name Jay Leno as the host of The Tonight Show over David Letterman in 1992. The move sparked controversy, as Letterman jumped to CBS after Leno's appointment. Agoglia's role in choosing Leno as Johnny Carson's successor was noted in the 1994 book, The Late Shift, by New York Times journalist, Bill Carter. An HBO film adaptation of the book, The Late Shift, aired in 1996. Agoglia was portrayed by actor Reni Santoni in the film.

Agoglia led a multi-network 1993 boycott of the Emmy Awards, following a decision by the Academy of Television Arts & Sciences to air the awards exclusively on ABC. The Emmys had previously broadcast on the television networks on a rotating basis. Agoglia denounced the exclusivity agreement between ABC and the Emmys as "bizarre at best" and retaliated by boycott all Academy events, including the Primetime Emmy Awards. The academy and the Emmys, under pressure from Agoglia's boycott, eventually relented and cancelled the deal with ABC. The Emmys returned to the previous agreement, in which the award show was broadcast on each of the four broadcast networks on a rotating basic each year. Agoglia rejoined the executive committee of the Academy of Television Arts & Sciences in 1994 after the deal with ABC was ended.

On June 17, 1997, Agoglia announced his decision to retire from NBC. He left NBC in 1998 after eighteen years with the network.

During his retirement Agoglia launched a Media Consulting firm; served as President of the Board of LAX Airport Commission; Served on board of directors of KCET Los Angeles; and was board chairman of the Los Angeles Universal Preschool Program.

John Agoglia died on March 14, 2014, at the age of 76 following a three-year illness with cancer. He was survived by his sons, Anthony and John Steven, three grandchildren, and his brother, Thomas Agoglia. His wife, Joanne Agoglia, died in 2010.
