= 3rd Screen Actors Guild Awards =

- Awarded for: Outstanding motion picture and primetime television performances
- Date: February 22, 1997
- Location: Shrine Auditorium; Los Angeles, California
- Country: United States
- Presented by: Screen Actors Guild
- Website: www.sagawards.org

Television/radio coverage
- Network: NBC

The 3rd Screen Actors Guild Awards, awarded by the Screen Actors Guild and honoring the best achievements in film and television performances for the year 1996, took place on February 22, 1997. The ceremony was held at the Shrine Exposition Center in Los Angeles, California, and was televised live by NBC. The nominees were announced on January 23, 1997.

== Winners and nominees ==
Winners are listed first and highlighted in boldface.

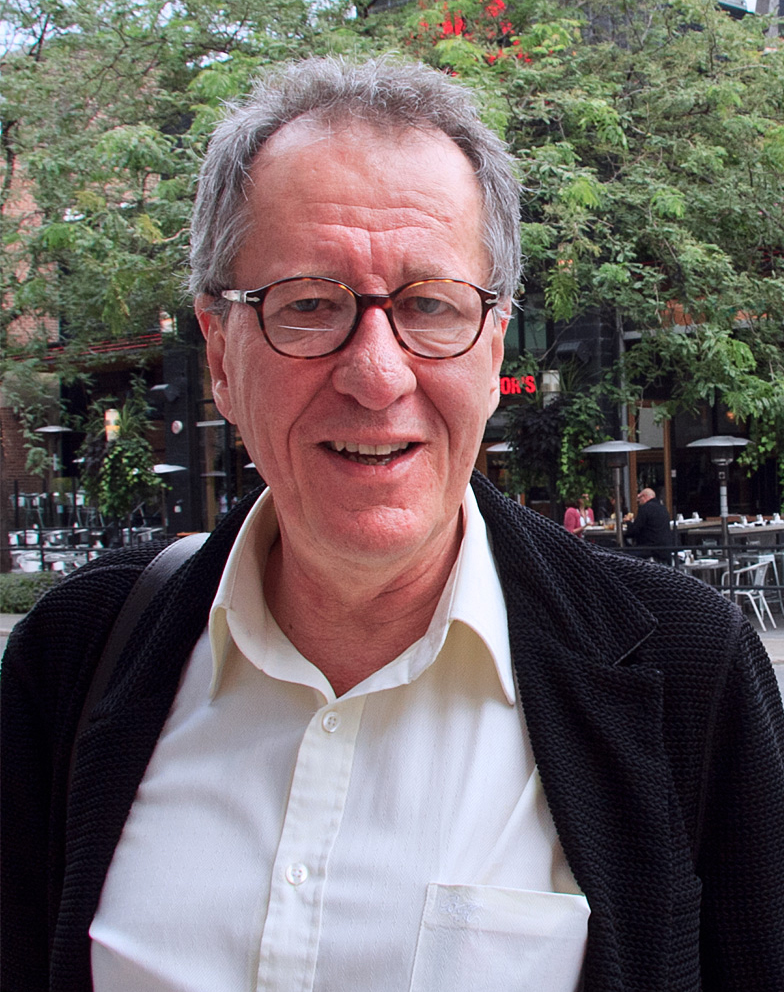
Geoffrey Rush, Outstanding Performance by a Male Actor in a Leading Role winner

Frances McDormand, Outstanding Performance by a Female Actor in a Leading Role winner

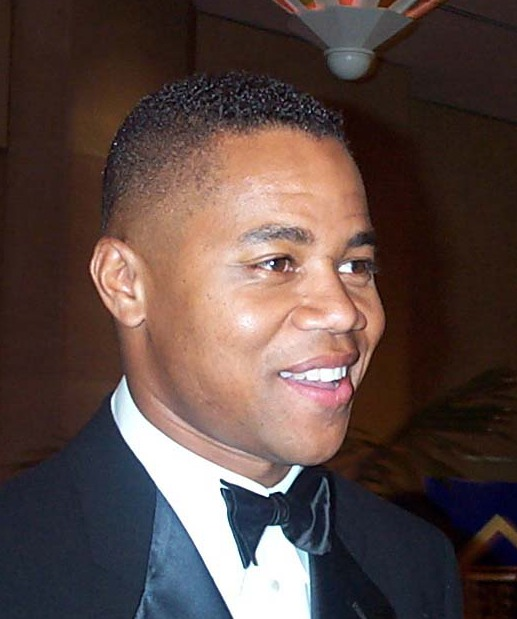
Cuba Gooding Jr., Outstanding Performance by a Male Actor in a Supporting Role winner

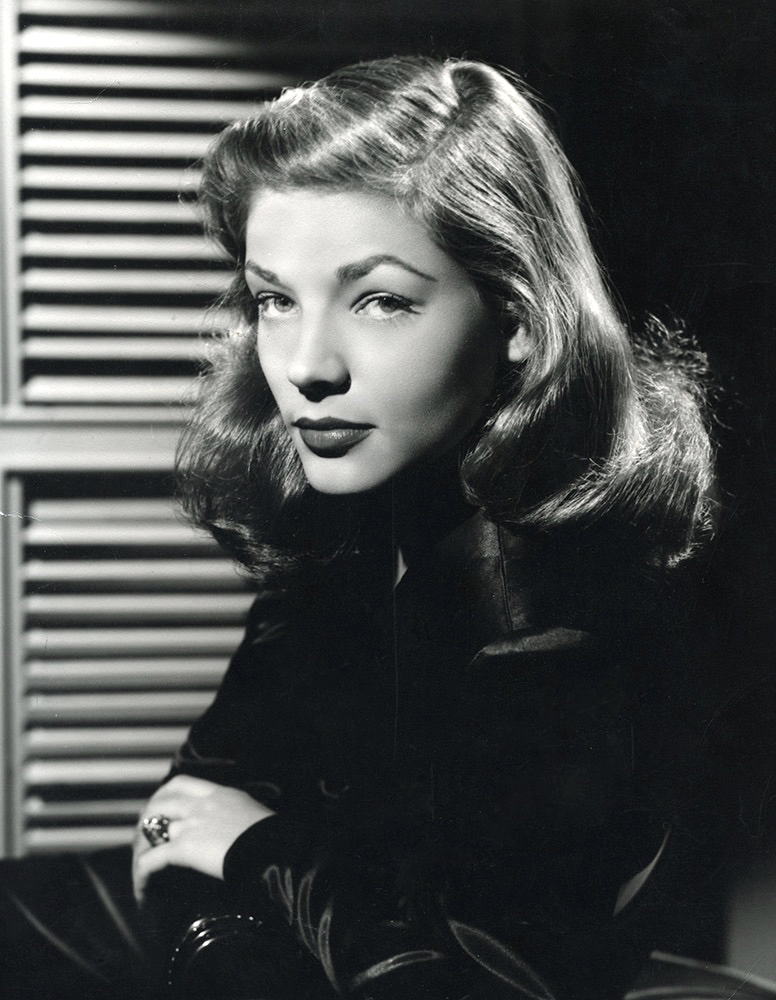
Lauren Bacall, Outstanding Performance by a Female Actor in a Supporting Role winner

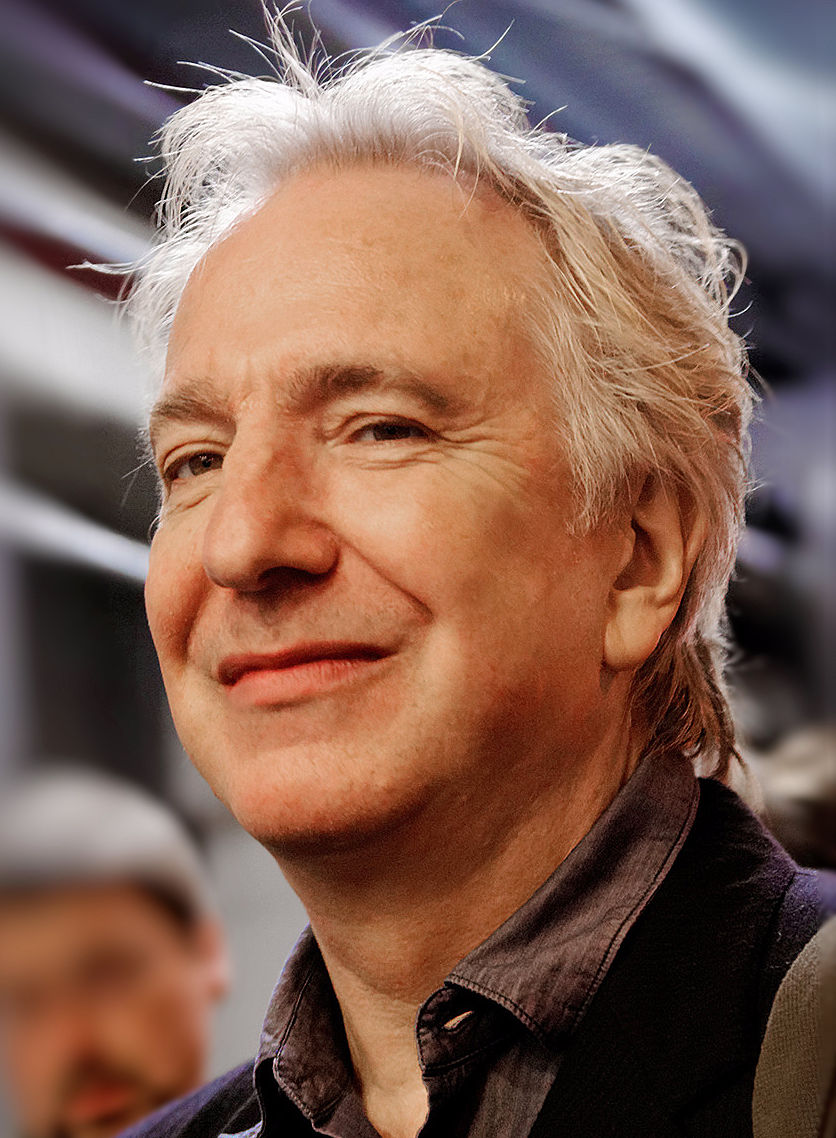
Alan Rickman, Outstanding Performance by a Male Actor in a Miniseries or Television Movie winner

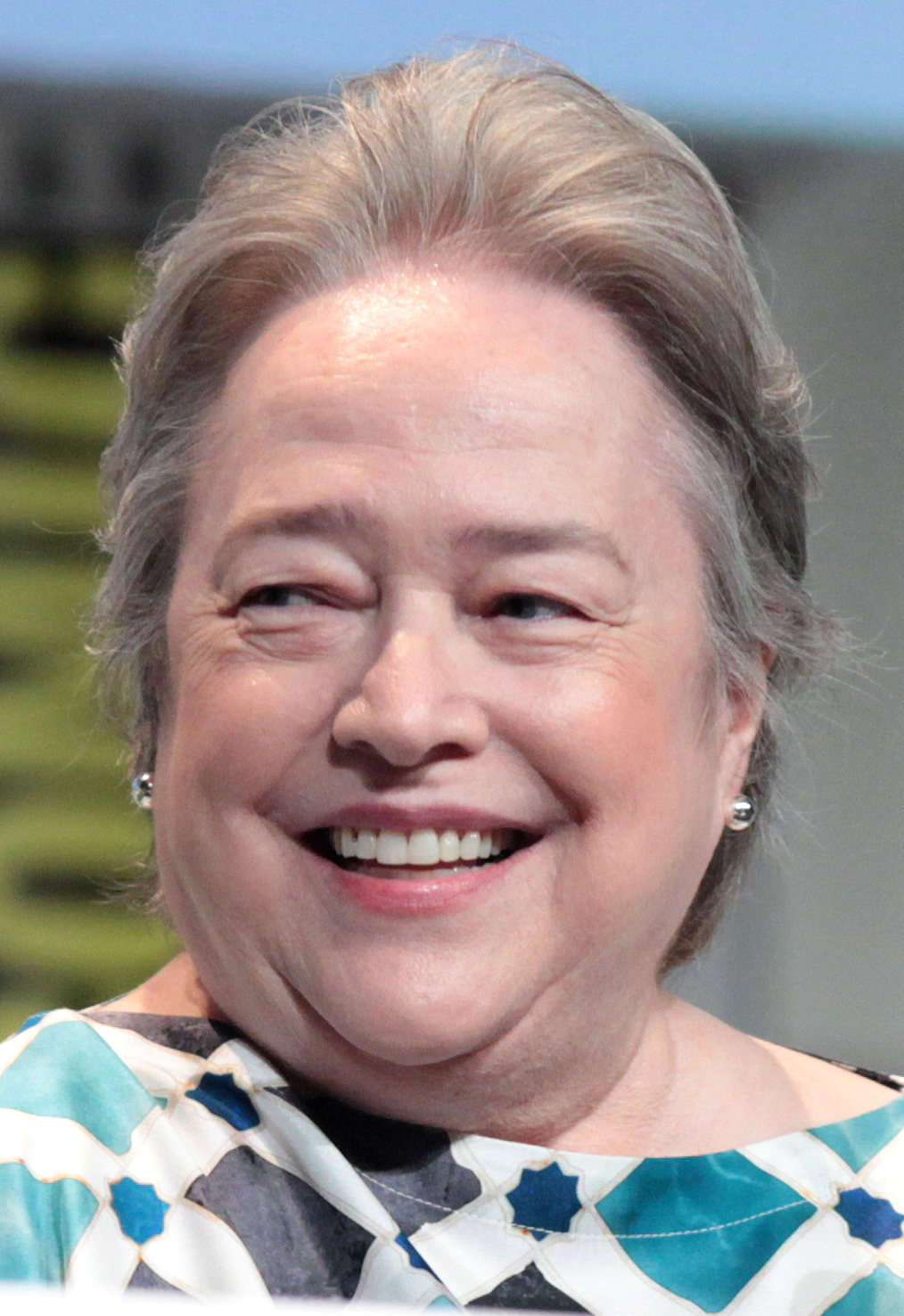
Kathy Bates, Outstanding Performance by a Female Actor in a Miniseries or Television Movie winner

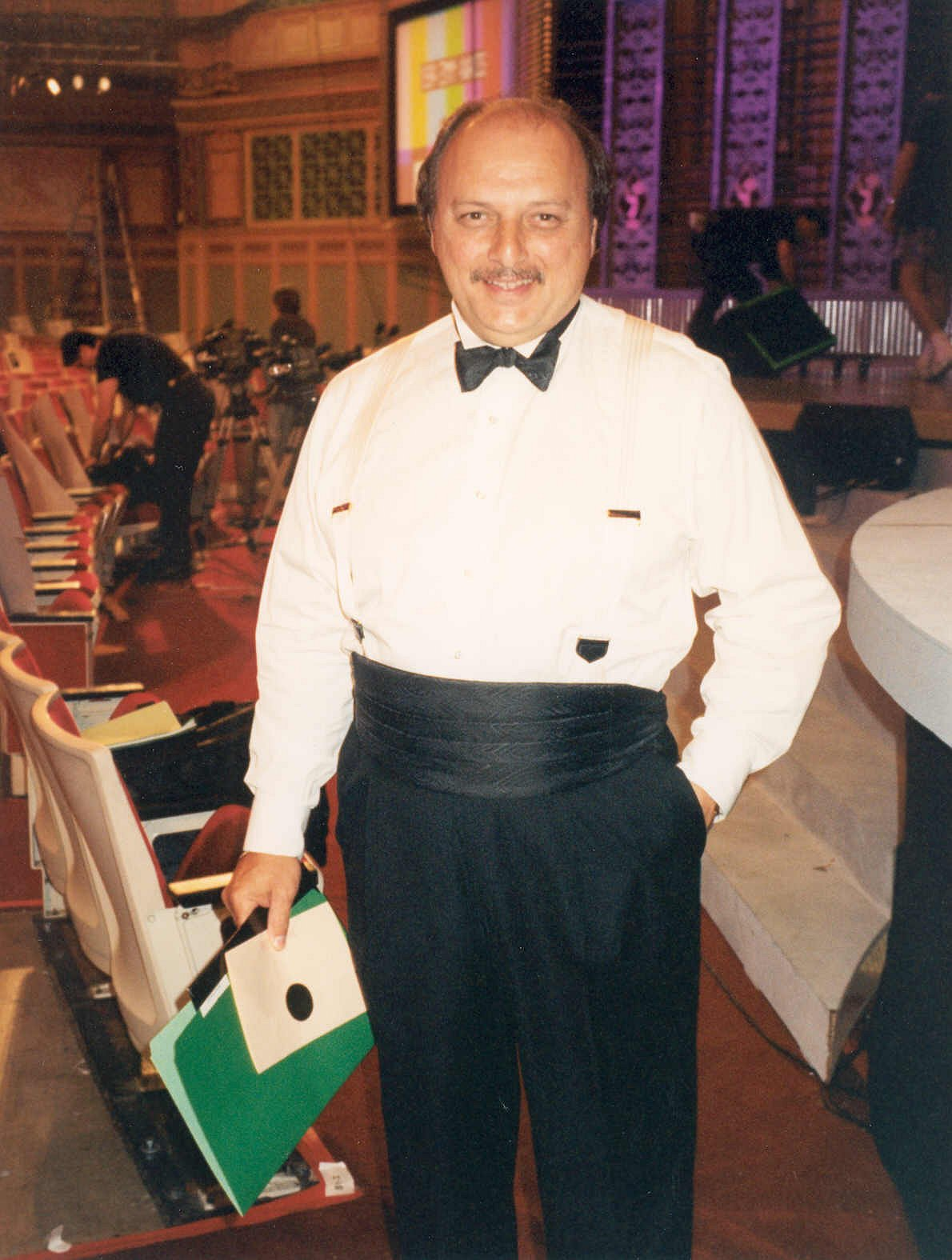
Dennis Franz, Outstanding Performance by a Male Actor in a Drama Series winner

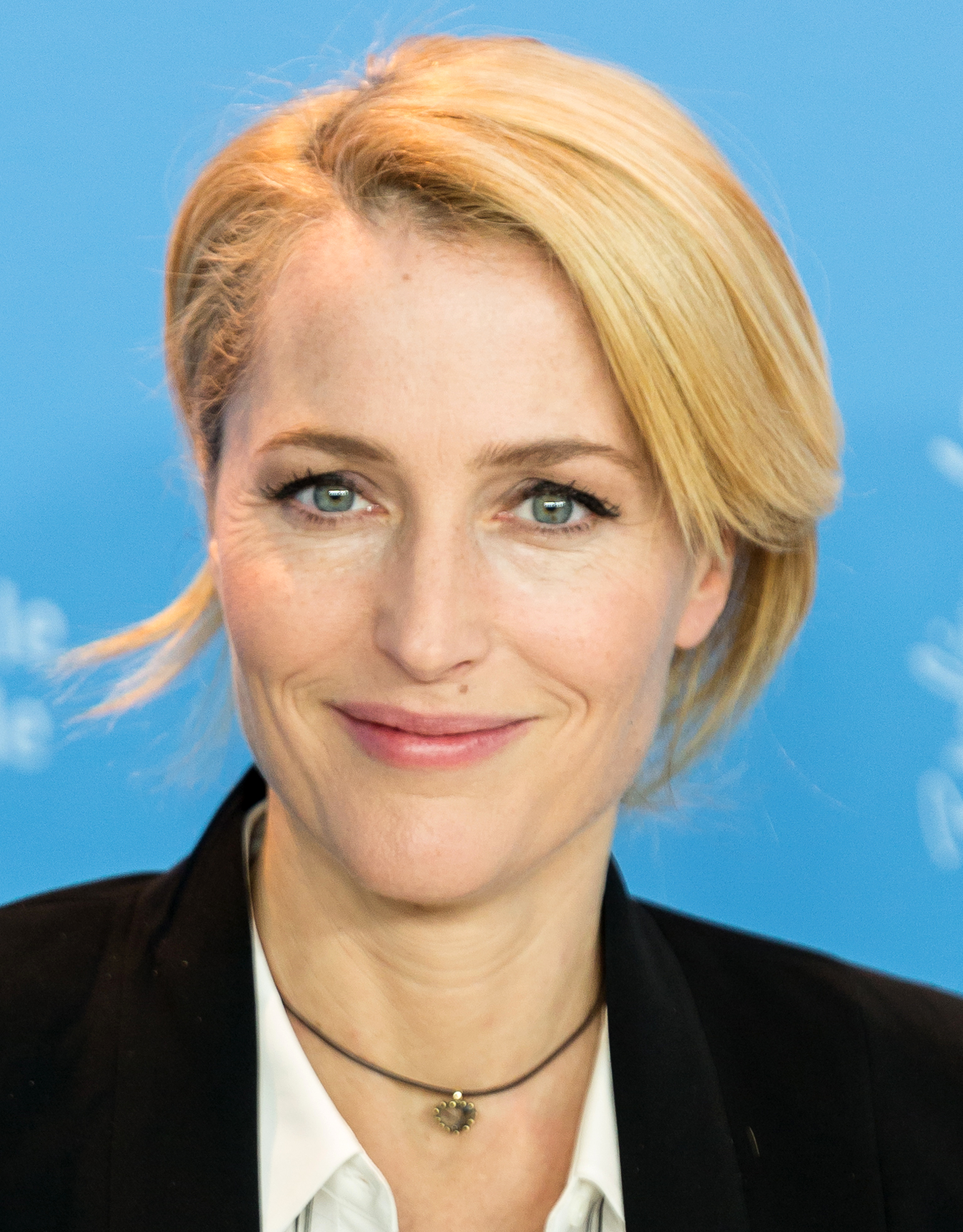
Gillian Anderson, Outstanding Performance by a Female Actor in a Drama Series winner

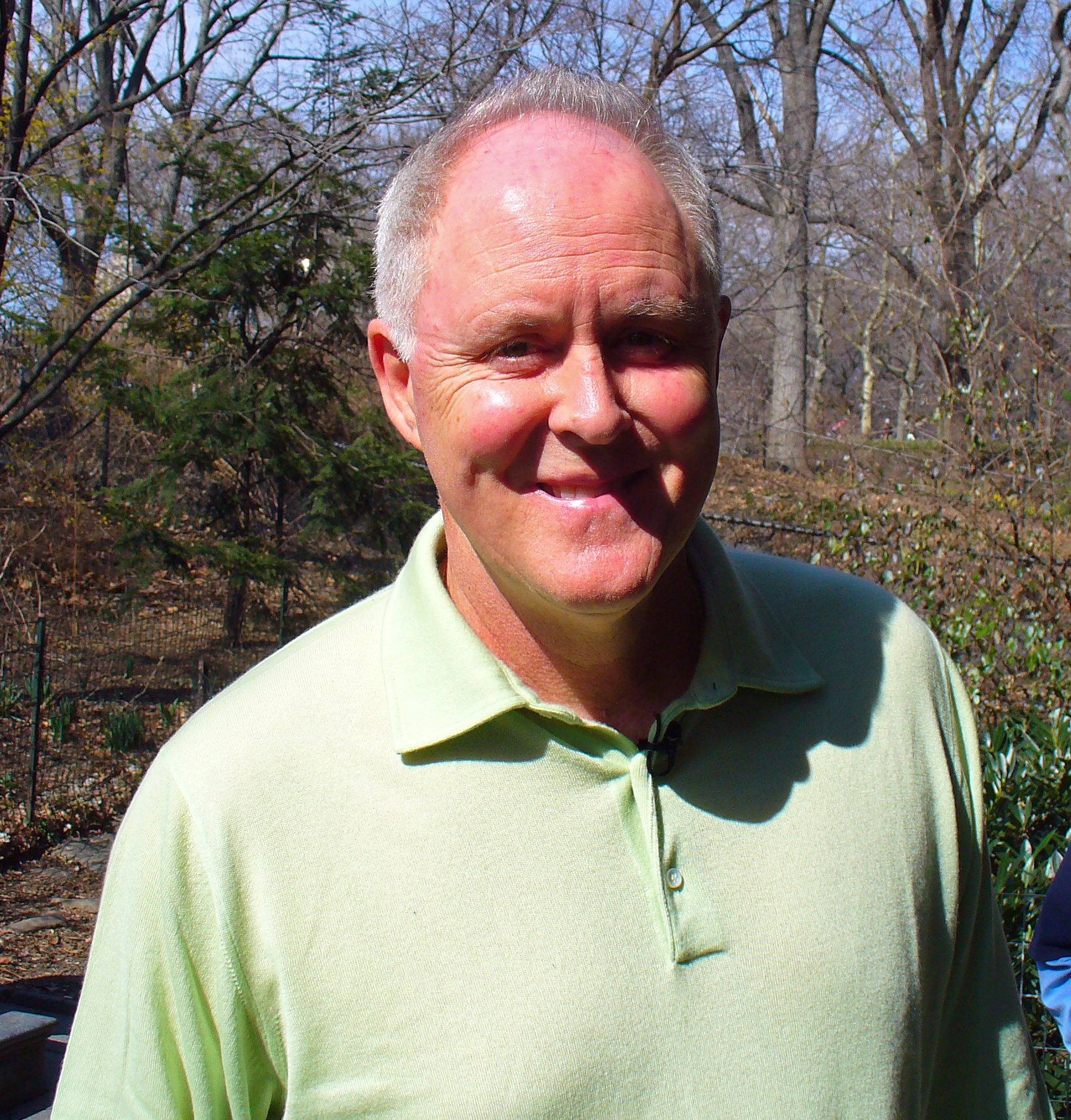
John Lithgow, Outstanding Performance by a Male Actor in a Comedy Series winner

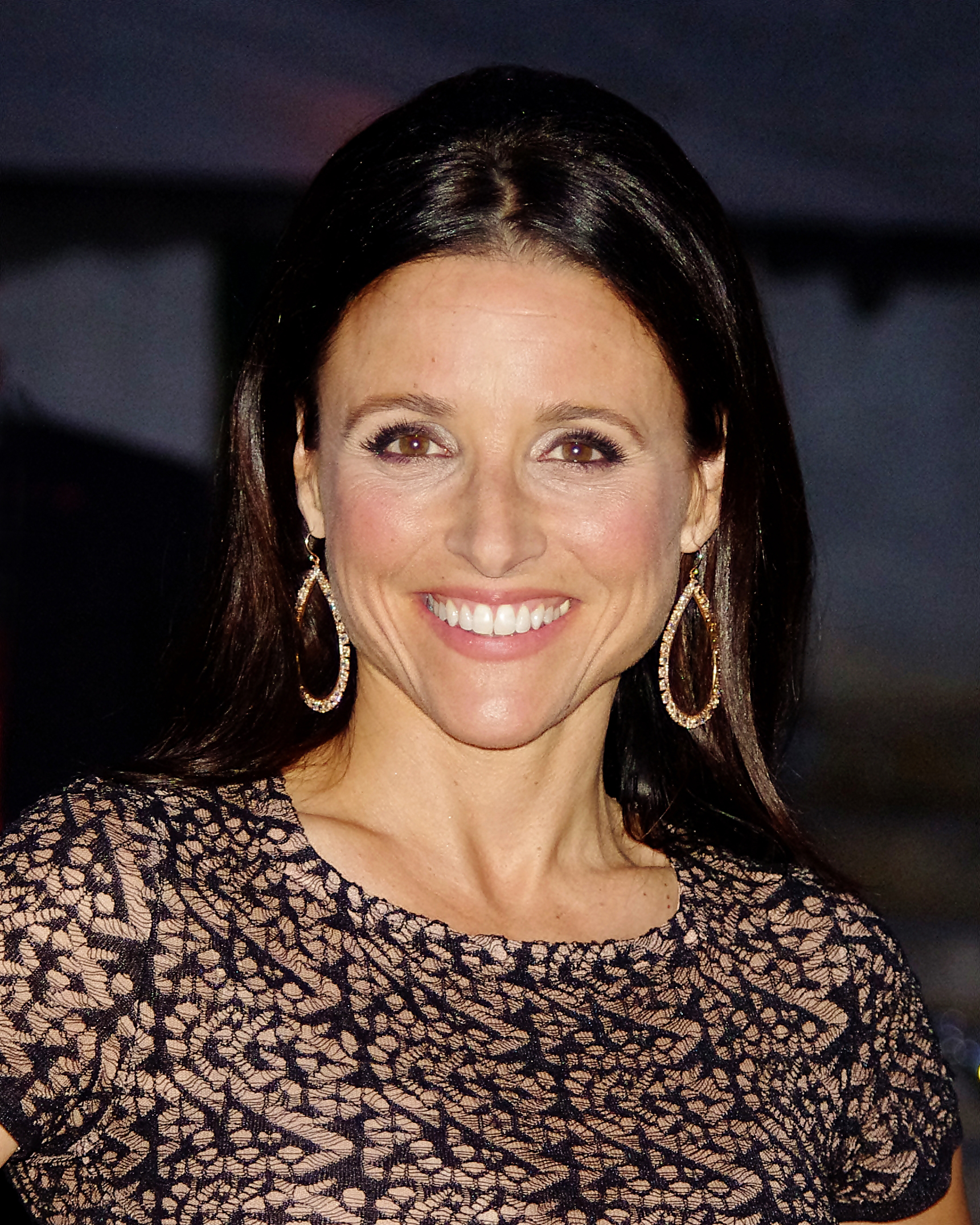
Julia Louis-Dreyfus, Outstanding Performance by a Female Actor in a Comedy Series winner

=== Film ===
Outstanding Performance by a Male Actor in a Leading Role	Outstanding Performance by a Female Actor in a Leading Role
**Geoffrey Rush – Shine as David Helfgott**; Tom Cruise – Jerry Maguire as Jerry Maguire; Ralph Fiennes – The English Patient as László Almásy; Woody Harrelson – The People vs. Larry Flynt as Larry Flynt; Billy Bob Thornton – Sling Blade as Karl Childers	**Frances McDormand – Fargo as Marge Gunderson**; Brenda Blethyn – Secrets & Lies as Cynthia Rose Purley; Diane Keaton – Marvin's Room as Bessie Wakefield; Gena Rowlands – Unhook the Stars as Mildred "Millie" Hawks; Kristin Scott Thomas – The English Patient as Katharine Clifton
Outstanding Performance by a Male Actor in a Supporting Role	Outstanding Performance by a Female Actor in a Supporting Role
**Cuba Gooding Jr. – Jerry Maguire as Rodney "Rod" Tidwell**; Hank Azaria – The Birdcage as Agador Spartacus; Nathan Lane – The Birdcage as Albert Goldman; William H. Macy – Fargo as Jerry Lundegaard; Noah Taylor – Shine as David Helfgott	**Lauren Bacall – The Mirror Has Two Faces as Hannah Morgan**; Juliette Binoche – The English Patient as Hana; Marisa Tomei – Unhook the Stars as Monica Warren; Gwen Verdon – Marvin's Room as Ruth Wakefield Warren; Renée Zellweger – Jerry Maguire as Dorothy Boyd
Outstanding Performance by a Cast in a Motion Picture
**The Birdcage – Hank Azaria, Christine Baranski, Dan Futterman, Gene Hackman, Nathan Lane, Dianne Wiest, and Robin Williams**; The English Patient – Naveen Andrews, Juliette Binoche, Willem Dafoe, Ralph Fiennes, Colin Firth, Jürgen Prochnow, Kristin Scott Thomas, and Julian Wadham; Marvin's Room – Hume Cronyn, Robert De Niro, Leonardo DiCaprio, Dan Hedaya, Diane Keaton, Hal Scardino, Meryl Streep, and Gwen Verdon; Shine – John Gielgud, Armin Mueller-Stahl, Lynn Redgrave, Geoffrey Rush, Noah Taylor, and Googie Withers; Sling Blade – Lucas Black, Natalie Canerday, Robert Duvall, James Hampton, John Ritter, Billy Bob Thornton, J. T. Walsh, and Dwight Yoakam

=== Television ===
Outstanding Performance by a Male Actor in a Miniseries or Television Movie	Outstanding Performance by a Female Actor in a Miniseries or Television Movie
**Alan Rickman – Rasputin: Dark Servant of Destiny as Grigori Rasputin**; Armand Assante – Gotti as John Gotti; Beau Bridges – Hidden in America as Bill Januson; Robert Duvall – The Man Who Captured Eichmann as Adolf Eichmann; Ed Harris – Riders of the Purple Sage as Jim Lassiter	**Kathy Bates – The Late Shift as Helen Kushnick**; Anne Bancroft – Homecoming as Abigail Tillerman; Stockard Channing – An Unexpected Family as Barbara Whitney; Jena Malone – Bastard out of Carolina as Ruth Anne "Bone" Boatwright; Cicely Tyson – The Road to Galveston as Jordan Roosevelt
Outstanding Performance by a Male Actor in a Drama Series	Outstanding Performance by a Female Actor in a Drama Series
**Dennis Franz – NYPD Blue as Andy Sipowicz**; George Clooney – ER as Doug Ross; David Duchovny – The X-Files as Fox Mulder; Anthony Edwards – ER as Mark Greene; Jimmy Smits – NYPD Blue as Bobby Simone	**Gillian Anderson – The X-Files as Dana Scully**; Kim Delaney – NYPD Blue as Diane Russell; Christine Lahti – Chicago Hope as Kathryn Austin; Della Reese – Touched by an Angel as Tess; Jane Seymour – Dr. Quinn, Medicine Woman as Dr. Michaela "Mike" Quinn
Outstanding Performance by a Male Actor in a Comedy Series	Outstanding Performance by a Female Actor in a Comedy Series
**John Lithgow – 3rd Rock from the Sun as Dick Solomon**; Jason Alexander – Seinfeld as George Costanza; Kelsey Grammer – Frasier as Frasier Crane; David Hyde Pierce – Frasier as Niles Crane; Michael Richards – Seinfeld as Cosmo Kramer	**Julia Louis-Dreyfus – Seinfeld as Elaine Benes**; Christine Baranski – Cybill as Maryann Thorpe; Ellen DeGeneres – Ellen as Ellen Morgan; Helen Hunt – Mad About You as Jamie Buchman; Kristen Johnston – 3rd Rock from the Sun as Sally Solomon
Outstanding Performance by an Ensemble in a Drama Series
**ER – George Clooney, Anthony Edwards, Laura Innes, Eriq La Salle, Julianna Margulies, Gloria Reuben, Sherry Stringfield, and Noah Wyle**; Chicago Hope – Adam Arkin, Peter Berg, Jayne Brook, Rocky Carroll, Vondie Curtis-Hall, Héctor Elizondo, Thomas Gibson, Mark Harmon, Roxanne Hart, Christine Lahti, and Jamey Sheridan; Law & Order – Benjamin Bratt, Jill Hennessy, Steven Hill, Carey Lowell, S. Epatha Merkerson, Jerry Orbach, and Sam Waterston; NYPD Blue – Gordon Clapp, Kim Delaney, Dennis Franz, Sharon Lawrence, James McDaniel, Justine Miceli, Gail O'Grady, Jimmy Smits, and Nicholas Turturro; The X-Files – Gillian Anderson, William B. Davis, David Duchovny, Mitch Pileggi, and Steven Williams
Outstanding Performance by an Ensemble in a Comedy Series
**Seinfeld – Jason Alexander, Julia Louis-Dreyfus, Michael Richards, and Jerry Seinfeld**; 3rd Rock from the Sun – Jane Curtin, Joseph Gordon-Levitt, Kristen Johnston, John Lithgow, and French Stewart; Frasier – Dan Butler, Peri Gilpin, Kelsey Grammer, Jane Leeves, John Mahoney, and David Hyde Pierce; Mad About You – Helen Hunt, Leila Kenzle, John Pankow, Anne Ramsay, and Paul Reiser; Remember WENN – Tom Beckett, Carolee Carmello, George Hall, Margaret Hall, John Bedford Lloyd, Melinda Mullins, Christopher Murney, Amanda Naughton, Hugh O'Gorman, Kevin O'Rourke, Dina Spybey, and Mary Stout

=== Screen Actors Guild Life Achievement Award ===
- Angela Lansbury

== Multiple nominations ==
=== Film ===
Nominations	Film
4	The English Patient
3	The Birdcage
3	Jerry Maguire
3	Marvin's Room
3	Shine
2	Fargo
2	Sling Blade
2	Unhook the Stars

=== Television ===
Nominations	Program
4	NYPD Blue
4	Seinfeld
3	3rd Rock from the Sun
3	ER
3	Frasier
3	The X-Files
2	Chicago Hope
2	Mad About You

== Multiple wins ==
=== Television ===
Wins	Program
2	Seinfeld

== In Memoriam ==
It was presented a memorial to the SAG's members who died during last year:

- Dorothy Lamour
- Whit Bissell
- Ben Johnson
- Jack Weston
- Dana Hill
- Ray Combs
- Bibi Besch
- Brigitte Helm
- Jeremy Sinden
- Natividad Vacío
- Jon Pertwee
- Marcello Mastroianni
- Virginia Christine
- Vince Edwards
- Vito Scotti
- Joanne Dru
- Claudette Colbert
- Greer Garson
- Robert Ridgely
- Greg Morris
- Morey Amsterdam
- Joe Seneca
- Lew Ayres
- Michael Fox
- Gene Nelson
- Sheldon Leonard
- Larry Gates
- Jason Bernard
- Gene Kelly
- George Burns
