= Tonight Show conflict =

There have been two conflicts regarding the hosting duties of NBC's The Tonight Show, both involving Jay Leno.

- 1992 Tonight Show conflict, between Leno and David Letterman
- 2010 Tonight Show conflict, between Leno and Conan O'Brien

== See also ==
- Jay Leno
- David Letterman
- Conan O'Brien
- Late Night with David Letterman
- Late Night with Conan O'Brien
- The Tonight Show with Jay Leno
- The Tonight Show with Conan O'Brien
- Late Show with David Letterman
- Conan (talk show)
