= The Late Shift (film) =

1996 film by Betty Thomas

- DVD cover
- Based on: The Late Shift by Bill Carter
- Written by: Bill Carter; George Armitage
- Directed by: Betty Thomas
- Starring: Kathy Bates; John Michael Higgins; Daniel Roebuck; Bob Balaban; Ed Begley Jr.; Treat Williams
- Music by: Ira Newborn
- Country of origin: United States
- Original language: English

Production
- Executive producers: Ivan Reitman; Joe Medjuck
- Producer: Don Carmody
- Cinematography: Mac Ahlberg
- Editor: Peter Teschner
- Running time: 95 minutes
- Production companies: HBO Pictures; Northern Lights Entertainment

Original release
- Network: HBO
- Release: February 24, 1996

The Late Shift is a 1996 American made-for-television biographical film directed by Betty Thomas, and written by New York Times media reporter Bill Carter and George Armitage. Released by HBO Pictures and produced in conjunction with Northern Lights Entertainment, the film premiered on HBO on February 24, 1996.

Based on Carter's 1994 book of the same name, the film chronicles the late-night television conflict between Jay Leno and David Letterman in the early 1990s, surrounding NBC's appointment of Leno to succeed Johnny Carson as host of The Tonight Show, and Late Night host Letterman's resulting efforts to negotiate out of his contract with the network to host his own competing talk show for CBS.

== Plot ==
In 1991, behind-the-scenes network politics embroil television executives responsible for NBC's late-night programming. Johnny Carson has hosted The Tonight Show since 1962, but he and his audience are both growing older, leaving NBC to anticipate the day when a new host will be needed. Carson's then-permanent guest host, Jay Leno, and the host of the show that follows Carson's each night, David Letterman, both vie for Carson's job. It is widely assumed that Letterman is the hand-picked successor whom Carson favors, but NBC executives privately speculate that Leno could be more popular with audiences, as well as easier for the network to control. Moreover, NBC believes they have highly favorable contract terms with Letterman that will prevent him from leaving in any case.

Leno's manager, Helen Kushnick, secures the spot for Leno with negotiating tactics that could be construed as either shrewd or unethical. Leno is concerned that Kushnick's methods might alienate Carson but does not wish to be disloyal, as he believes that she has been responsible for his success; in addition, he had promised to take care of her after her husband's death. Kushnick harshly instructs Leno to just keep telling jokes and leave the business end to her. Surely enough, Kushnick secures the producer's position for herself at The Tonight Show, on the condition that no public announcement will be made. Letterman continues to believe he is still in contention for the position.

In the spring of 1991, Carson, feeling he is being pushed aside, unexpectedly announces his retirement. NBC executives inform an angry Letterman they have selected Leno to replace Carson. Leno takes over on May 25, 1992, but Kushnick's bullying manner angers his colleagues, potential guests and others to the point of interfering with network airtime and relations. Executives warn the mild-mannered Leno that they are going to fire Kushnick and, if he sides with her, he will be let go as well. Kushnick is dismissed by NBC and barred from the studio lot. Despite her pleas to keep his promise to take care of her and her daughter, Leno is angry because she nearly cost him a dream job. After a heated argument, Leno fires Kushnick and ends their friendship. Later, Leno eavesdrops on a meeting in which NBC executives discuss the possibility of replacing him with Letterman.

Letterman, devastated at being passed over, hires Hollywood superagent Michael Ovitz to negotiate on his behalf. Ovitz promises that not only will Letterman be offered an 11:30 p.m. show, he will be offered it by every network. True to Ovitz's word, Letterman is courted by all the major networks and syndicates, albeit only informally after Ovitz learns that Letterman is contractually barred from negotiating with NBC's competitors.

After securing more lenient terms from NBC, Ovitz receives a lucrative offer from CBS which effectively guarantees Letterman an 11:30 p.m show. Letterman provisionally accepts but continues to hold on to his lifelong dream of hosting The Tonight Show. Per Letterman's contract with NBC, the network still has several months to either match CBS's offer or present an acceptable counteroffer to keep Letterman. Producer Peter Lassally, close to both Carson and Letterman, finally convinces NBC to offer Letterman the Tonight Show position. However, NBC's offer is substantially weaker than CBS's and would force Letterman to wait until May 1994 to take over the show. Lassally, disappointed at NBC's offer, makes it clear to Letterman that the Tonight Show job is now "damaged goods" and Letterman would be working with the very people who passed him over and may yet double-cross him. In addition, Lassally warns Letterman that he will be vilified in the press for forcing Leno out.

Taking Lassally's suggestion, Letterman calls Carson to ask for advice; Carson says he would probably leave NBC if he were in Letterman's position. Letterman rejects NBC's counteroffer and accepts CBS's offer to host his own 11:30 show (to be called the Late Show with David Letterman) beginning on August 30, 1993. Letterman and Leno ultimately go head-to-head at 11:30, with Letterman initially winning in the TV ratings in the beginning, before Leno firmly re-establishes The Tonight Show's dominance.

== Cast ==
- Kathy Bates as Helen Kushnick
- John Michael Higgins as David Letterman
- Daniel Roebuck as Jay Leno
- Bob Balaban as Warren Littlefield
- Ed Begley, Jr. as Rod Perth
- Peter Jurasik as Howard Stringer
- Reni Santoni as John Agoglia
- John Kapelos as Robert Morton
- Steven Gilborn as Peter Lassally
- John Getz as Brandon Tartikoff
- Lawrence Pressman as Bob Wright
- Sandra Bernhard as Herself
- Treat Williams as Michael Ovitz
- Paul Elder as Rupert Murdoch
- Michael Fairman as Michael Gartner
- Ken Kragen as Himself
- Aaron Lustig as Paul Shaffer
- Kevin Scannell as Dick Ebersol
- Edmund L. Shaff as Jack Welch
- Kerry Noonan as Letterman's Girlfriend
- Rich Little as Johnny Carson
- Little Richard as Himself
- Nicholas Guest as Bob Iger
- Penny Peyser as Susan Binford
- Lucinda Jenney as Debbie Vickers
- Arthur Taxier as Lee Gabler

Real-life CBS executive Rod Perth (played by Ed Begley Jr. in the film) appears briefly in a cameo role (he is the person Howard Stringer mistakes for Perth in the CAA lobby). Actor Ed Begley Jr. and Rod Perth share an extraordinary physical resemblance, something the film makers milk for humor in the scene.

== Awards and nominations ==
| Year | Award | Category | Nominee(s) | Result | Ref. |
|---|---|---|---|---|---|
| 1996 | Artios Awards | Outstanding Achievement in Movie of the Week Casting | Nancy Foy | Nominated | |
| 1996 | CableACE Awards | Movie or Miniseries | | Nominated | |
| 1996 | Primetime Emmy Awards | Outstanding Made for Television Movie | Ivan Reitman, Joe Medjuck, Daniel Goldberg, and Don Carmody | Nominated | |
| 1996 | Primetime Emmy Awards | Outstanding Supporting Actor in a Miniseries or a Special | Treat Williams | Nominated | |
| 1996 | Primetime Emmy Awards | Outstanding Supporting Actress in a Miniseries or a Special | Kathy Bates | Nominated | |
| 1996 | Primetime Emmy Awards | Outstanding Directing for a Miniseries or a Special | Betty Thomas | Nominated | |
| 1996 | Primetime Emmy Awards | Outstanding Writing for a Miniseries or a Special | Bill Carter and George Armitage | Nominated | |
| 1996 | Primetime Emmy Awards | Outstanding Casting for a Miniseries or a Special | Nancy Foy and Phyllis Huffman | Nominated | |
| 1996 | Primetime Emmy Awards | Outstanding Makeup for a Miniseries or a Special | June Westmore, Monty Westmore, Sharin Helgestad, Del Acevedo, and Matthew W. Mungle | Nominated | |
| 1997 | American Comedy Awards | Funniest Female Performer in a TV Special – Network, Cable or Syndication | Kathy Bates | Won | |
| 1997 | Directors Guild of America Awards | Outstanding Directorial Achievement in Dramatic Specials | Betty Thomas | Won | |
| 1997 | Golden Globe Awards | Best Supporting Actress in a Series, Miniseries or Motion Picture Made for Television | Kathy Bates | Won | |
| 1997 | Satellite Awards | Best Supporting Actor in a Series, Miniseries or Motion Picture Made for Television | Treat Williams | Nominated | |
| 1997 | Satellite Awards | Best Supporting Actress in a Series, Miniseries or Motion Picture Made for Television | Kathy Bates | Won | |
| 1997 | Screen Actors Guild Awards | Outstanding Performance by a Female Actor in a Television Movie or Miniseries | Kathy Bates | Won | |

== David Letterman's response ==
David Letterman, who saw clips of the film, called the movie "the biggest waste of film since my wedding photos." He also likened John Michael Higgins's version of him to a "circus chimp" and "budding psychotic." During production, Letterman invited Higgins onto his program, but Higgins declined. Following the film’s release, Higgins accepted a booking on the show, although Letterman purposefully let the show run long enough to prevent Higgins from actually joining, with the promise of a rescheduling which never materialized.

== Lawsuit ==
Kushnick filed a $30 million lawsuit against Bill Carter, author of the eponymous book upon which the HBO film was based, claiming libel. Specifically, her case related to a claim that she planted a story about Carson's retirement in the New York Post. The then-pending lawsuit was noted in the film's epilogue, as the Broadway tune "There's No Business Like Show Business" plays. The lawsuit settled out of court for an undisclosed sum; Kushnick died of cancer in August 1996.

== Sequel ==
On January 19, 2010, during Conan O'Brien's final week as host of "The Tonight Show," guest Quentin Tarantino jokingly suggested he direct a sequel to The Late Shift, cast O'Brien as himself and make it a revenge movie in the style of his film Kill Bill with the title Late Shift 2: The Rolling Thunder of Revenge. The Toronto Star reported in February 2010 that a sequel to The Late Shift film was in planning stages. In the final episode of The Tonight Show with Conan O'Brien, O'Brien said that he wished actress Tilda Swinton could portray him in a film version of The Tonight Show conflict, referring to a running gag about their similar appearance. Swinton subsequently expressed interest in being cast as Conan O'Brien in a sequel to The Late Shift.

When asked in a June 2010 Movieline interview if there was going to be a film adaptation of The War for Late Night, Carter responded that plans were not serious at that point, stating, "Not really. Nothing serious. Let’s put it this way: There have always been people kicking it around because they think it’s funny. ... Letterman made a ... joke saying that Max von Sydow should play him. So, you know, people are just kicking it around like that." Actor Bob Balaban, who portrayed NBC executive Warren Littlefield in the film The Late Shift, said he wanted to portray Jeff Zucker, saying that actor Jason Alexander would also be a good choice for the part.
