= Helen Kushnick =

American talent agent (1945–1996)

- Born: August 18, 1945; New York, U.S.
- Died: August 28, 1996 (aged 51); Los Angeles, California, US
- Occupations: Television agent, executive producer
- Known for: The Tonight Show
- Spouse: Jerrold Kushnick

Helen Kushnick (née Gorman; August 18, 1945 – August 28, 1996) was the talent agent of comedians Jimmie Walker, Elayne Boosler, and Jay Leno for much of her early career. Leno had been performing stand-up comedy in a variety of venues when she found him, and afterwards, Kushnick was with him all the way to his role hosting The Tonight Show.

Her strong-arm tactics in her role as executive producer of the Tonight Show created a great deal of conflict with NBC. For example, she reportedly banned stars from appearing on the program if they appeared on any other talk show. These practices led to her dismissal only four months into her tenure in that position.

== Early life ==
Kushnick, born Helen Gorman, was born in Harlem in 1945 to a Catholic family. Her first job was working as a secretary for David Gerber, a 20th Century Fox producer in New York City. She moved to Hollywood with Gerber, working as a secretary and then as an agent as the International Creative Management talent agency.

== Filmography ==
- The Tonight Show with Jay Leno (1992) TV Series (executive producer)
- Jay Leno and the American Dream (1986) (TV) (executive producer)

== The Late Shift ==
The 1996 HBO TV movie The Late Shift (based on Bill Carter's New York Times bestselling book of the same title) uncovered the network politics that occurred prior to the retirement of Johnny Carson from The Tonight Show on NBC. The film starred Kathy Bates as Kushnick, who received an Emmy Award nomination for her role, and won a Golden Globe and Screen Actors Guild Award. Kushnick sued over her portrayal, and settled out of court for an undisclosed sum.

== Personal life ==
In 1983, Kushnick's three-year-old son, Samuel, died from AIDS-related complications due to an infected blood transfusion. Her husband Jerrold died at age 57 from colon cancer. Kushnick's daughter Sara Gerber is the sole surviving member of her immediate family. Kushnick, raised Catholic, converted to Judaism when she married Jerrold Kushnick.

Kushnick died of breast cancer in Los Angeles on August 28, 1996, aged 51.
