= 2010 Tonight Show conflict =

American late-night talk show conflict

Late-night talk show hosts Conan O'Brien (left) and Jay Leno talk on the set of The Tonight Show in 2004.

The 2010 Tonight Show conflict was a media and public relations conflict involving the American television network NBC and two of its late-night talk show hosts, Conan O'Brien and Jay Leno, over the timeslot and hosting duties of the long-running franchise The Tonight Show.

Leno, the host of The Tonight Show from 1992 to 2014, and O'Brien, host of Late Night from 1993 to 2009, were strong ratings leaders for NBC for much of the decade. In 2001, when O'Brien's contract neared its end and he was courted by other networks, NBC agreed to extend his contract and eventually make him the fifth host of The Tonight Show. NBC neglected to tell Leno about this arrangement until 2004, when they informed him that O'Brien would take over as host in five years. When that time arrived, in 2009, NBC tried to keep both of its late-night stars by offering Leno a nightly primetime show before the local news and O'Brien's Tonight Show.

The Tonight Show with Conan O'Brien and The Jay Leno Show did not immediately receive strong ratings, and NBC affiliates complained of declining viewership. NBC Universal CEO Jeff Zucker, alongside NBC chairman Jeff Gaspin and executive Rick Ludwin, created a ‘remedy’: return Leno to his 11:35 p.m. ET start time and bump O'Brien a half-hour later, to 12:05 a.m. ET. O'Brien and his staff were disappointed and furious; when it became clear O'Brien would not agree to the proposed changes, the situation grew heated. Though not a breach of either host's contract, the change resulted in a public outcry and public demonstrations largely in support of O'Brien.

O'Brien's public statement that he would not participate in the "destruction" of The Tonight Show led to negotiations with NBC for a settlement. O'Brien and his staff received US$45 million (equivalent to about $66 million in 2025) to walk away from the network, with his final Tonight Show airing January 22, 2010; Leno was reinstated as host that March, while after a contractual seven-month ban against appearing on television, O'Brien moved to TBS to host Conan. Leno returned to hosting The Tonight Show from 2010 until his retirement in 2014. The controversy surrounding the scheduling move and the reinstatement of Leno was described by media outlets as "embarrassing" and a "public relations disaster" for NBC.

== Background ==
NBC and The Tonight Show were first in late-night viewership for most of the 1990s and 2000s.

On May 25, 1991, Johnny Carson, host of NBC's The Tonight Show for nearly thirty years, announced his retirement and exited the program a year later. NBC signed Jay Leno, Carson's "exclusive guest host", to become the program's fourth host upon Carson's departure. Carson clearly held the view that the position should be given to David Letterman, host of his own program, Late Night, which had directly followed Carson's Tonight Show for ten years. NBC tried to appease both stars, but Letterman left NBC in a very public conflict that resulted in the creation of his own competing show, the Late Show with David Letterman, which debuted on CBS in 1993. Letterman's show regularly won in the Nielsen ratings against Leno for two years, proving that another late-night program could compete, both in ratings and advertising profits, with The Tonight Show.

Leno's Tonight Show started rocky; prior to Letterman's move, NBC considered matching CBS's offer to allow Letterman to take over from Leno. Letterman beat Leno for nearly two years until August 1995, when Leno welcomed Hugh Grant, who had recently been arrested for soliciting a sex worker, to a previously booked appearance on Tonight. From that point on, Leno beat Letterman in the ratings, and The Tonight Show remained number one for the next fourteen years (the remainder of Leno's entire first stint as host).

NBC chose to continue the Late Night franchise, and at the suggestion of Saturday Night Live producer Lorne Michaels, hired Conan O'Brien, a relatively unknown writer for SNL and The Simpsons, to take over the time slot beginning in late 1993. Late Night with Conan O'Brien was constantly at risk for cancellation in its early years; at one low point in 1994, NBC put O'Brien on a three-month contract. Executives were anxious to replace him with Greg Kinnear, who followed O'Brien with Later at 1:30 am, but Kinnear left to pursue a career in acting later on. Interns filled empty seats in O'Brien's audience while affiliates began to inquire about replacement hosts. Things improved for Late Night slowly (mostly revolving around O'Brien's performance) and by 1996, O'Brien's audience, largely young and male (a coveted demographic), grew steadily and the show began to beat competitors in the ratings, which it would continue to do for fifteen years.

A notable episode of O'Brien's tenure on Late Night came in early 1994 when Letterman asked to appear as a guest and say some kind words to him. O'Brien considered this the turning point of his entire career, which he mentioned while paying tribute to Letterman in an opening monologue of his own talk show on TBS, which aired the same night as Letterman's final show; O'Brien notably asked his viewers to turn him off and watch Letterman later on in the monologue.

== Early history ==
=== Contract renewals (2001–2004) ===
Near the turn of the millennium, NBC's late-night lineup—Leno at 11:35, O'Brien at 12:35, and SNL on the weekend—remained a leader in the ratings. By 2001, O'Brien's contract at NBC had less than a year left to run, and despite O'Brien arguably "coming into his own" in the preceding years, the network was reluctant to pay him on the same scale as other late-night hosts. That year, competing network Fox mounted an "extended, comprehensive campaign" to lure O'Brien away from NBC, citing his appeal from a younger late night demographic. News Corporation chairman and CEO Peter Chernin pursued O'Brien personally, taking him and executive producer Jeff Ross to dinner on several occasions. Fox's plan involved making O'Brien the network's signature star: his program would begin thirty minutes before Leno's and Letterman's (the network's local news broadcasts aired earlier than other networks, allowing the head start) and he would receive cross-promotion via its animated programming block and on Sunday NFL games. Chernin also offered the host seven times his current pay (a jump from US$3 million to US$21 million). Ross, friends with NBC president and CEO Jeff Zucker, informed him that Fox was aggressively pursuing O'Brien; NBC returned with a more realistic offer, bumping up O'Brien's salary to US$8 million and renewing him through 2005.

While many of O'Brien's professional advisors and managers pushed for the Fox deal, O'Brien's desire to possibly take over The Tonight Show after Leno made it a difficult decision (O'Brien, like many comedians, had grown up idolizing Carson's incarnation). Numerous NBC executives, including president Bob Wright, were optimistic that O'Brien would stay despite other networks being interested in signing him. Chernin warned O'Brien that waiting around for Leno to leave would be destructive to his late-night television career. Nevertheless, O'Brien signed a new deal with NBC in March 2002; the contract extended him through 2005 and most significantly contained a clause that solidified the official line of succession: If anything were to happen to Leno, O'Brien would step in. O'Brien's successful hosting job at the 2002 54th Primetime Emmy Awards "sent out the most resounding message yet about his growing strength as a performer", and a year later, NBC broadcast O'Brien's tenth anniversary special in primetime. By the time Leno's contract again came up for renewal, a discussion would be needed regarding the future of The Tonight Show. Facing the prospect of attempting to keep both Leno and O'Brien, Zucker made the final call on Leno's deal, deciding that this contract extension would be Leno's final. The plan would extend Leno four additional years, after which he would give The Tonight Show to O'Brien.

In February 2004, NBC executive Marc Graboff informed Ross of the conversations, and he in turn ran the idea of waiting four more years to O'Brien, who was immediately receptive. Zucker, along with top late-night executive Rick Ludwin, met with Leno in March at his Burbank studio to discuss the contract extension, and explained NBC's stance on handing over the show to O'Brien. While Leno quietly felt both disappointed and befuddled, he noted he did not want to see himself and O'Brien go through the same dilemma he and Letterman faced twelve years earlier and agreed to the plans. His only request was that NBC wait to announce O'Brien as host until well after the extension was signed, to which the executives agreed. While Leno handled the news professionally to the relief of Zucker, he soon headed to Tonight Show producer Debbie Vickers' office to let her know he felt as if he had just been fired. NBC's announcement of the renewal inevitably led to press speculation on O'Brien's fate; to that end, O'Brien and his team went with the charade, peppering interviews with unclear, vague statements on his future.

On September 27, 2004, O'Brien officially signed on to become the next host of The Tonight Show; NBC allowed the first comment aside from the press release to come from Leno on that night's show. Leno compared The Tonight Show to a dynasty, stating, "You hold it, and then you hand it off to the next person. And I don't want to see all the fighting and all the 'Who's better?' and nasty things back and forth in the press. So right now, here it is—Conan, it's yours! See you in five years, buddy!"

=== Losing Leno (2005–2008) ===
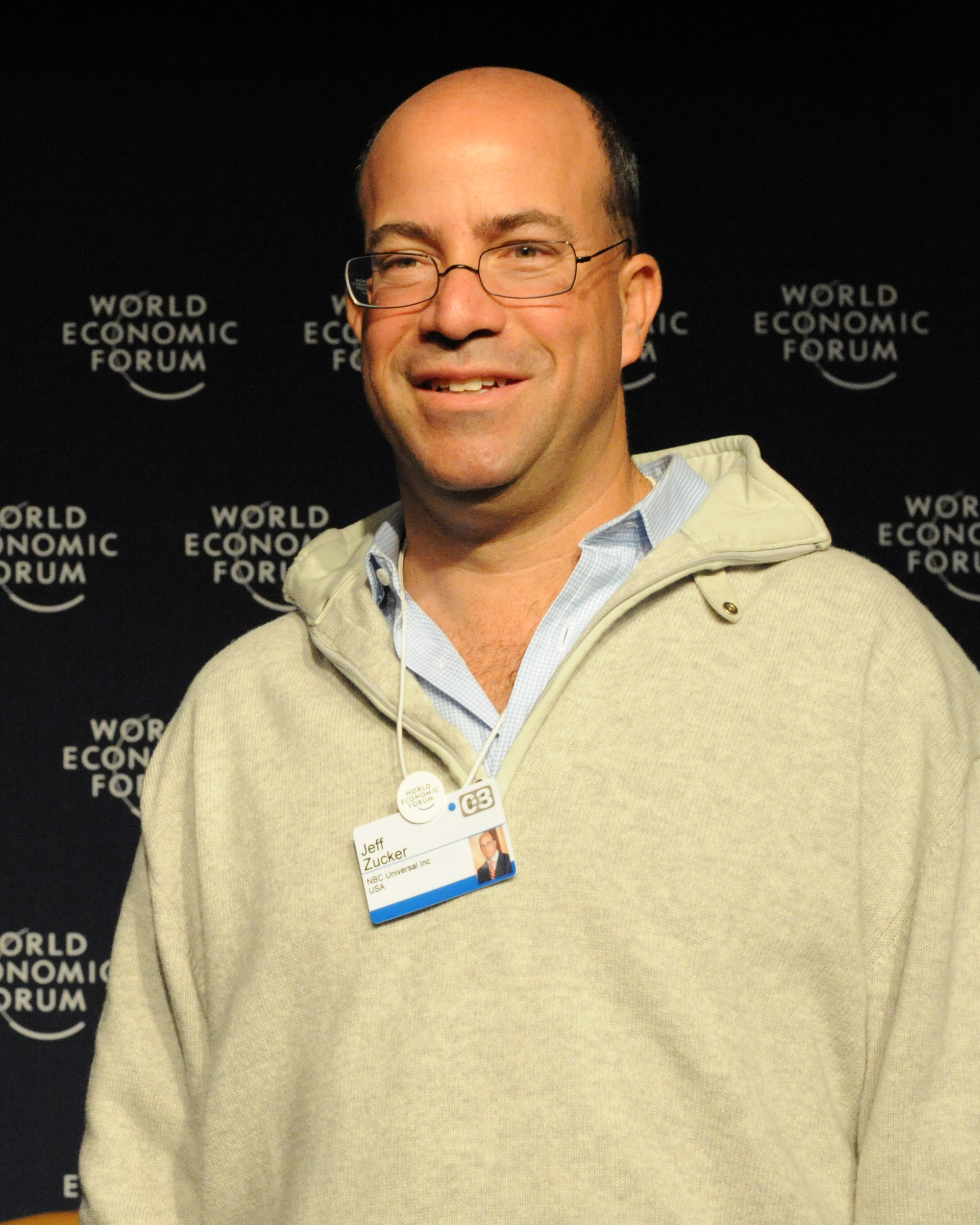
Jeff Zucker, former CEO of NBC Universal, was at the forefront of the conflict.

In private conversations, Leno likened his removal from The Tonight Show to the end of a relationship, noting that he was loyal and still ended up "heartbroken". From his perspective, NBC's decision made no sense, as his show had remained number one in ratings and consistently brought in money. He began frequently lamenting his confusion to producer Vickers, explaining that he was "sick of lying" when people inquired on his retirement. Eventually, Leno began mulling over his options after Tonight, telling his staff that after the transition, they could move to another network like ABC (whose Disney lot was not far from their then-current Burbank studio). His frustration with the situation came across in his nightly monologues, as more jokes regarding NBC's fourth-place position in the ratings, as well as jokes regarding the future transition, began to appear. While NBC executives tended not to worry in the immediate years following the decision, by 2007 Zucker began to ponder what losing Leno might mean for the network. Around this time, Fox and ABC began conveying interest and holding discreet conversations with Leno.

Among the offers made to Leno by NBC's competitors was from Sony Pictures Television for a syndicated program. In early 2008, Zucker began to make trips to the Burbank studio in an effort to keep Leno. He gave him numerous suggestions, including a Bob Hope-type deal (high-profile specials), a Sunday night primetime show, or even a nightly cable show on USA Network (owned by NBC Universal). Executives began to entertain an ideal solution—pay off O'Brien and retain Leno—but Zucker viewed the idea as "outrageous". By this time, NBC had already broken ground on a new studio for O'Brien's Tonight Show, renovating Stage 1 at the Universal Studios Lot in Universal City, for a reported US$50 million. During a spring lunch meeting with Ross, NBC Sports chief Dick Ebersol advised that O'Brien retire silly antics and focus more on pitching his show to middle America, which would involve stretching out his monologue. O'Brien, then a year away from inheriting The Tonight Show, was indeed lengthening his monologue, but viewed suggestions from Ludwin as largely unnecessary, desiring to put his own stamp on the show's tradition. By this point, O'Brien's high popularity at the time of the contract signing had gone down slightly. He had opted not to change his act to suit a more mainstream audience as NBC imagined he would, and CBS's Craig Ferguson, who occupied the post-Letterman slot as host of The Late Late Show, had begun to occasionally beat O'Brien in overall ratings. Though internal anxiety increased among executives, most tended to still support O'Brien.

Zucker's last resort for Leno was a nightly 10:00 pm program. He imagined a nightly Leno show in that timeslot could perhaps turn around NBC's primetime ratings decline. On December 8, 2008, Leno verbally agreed to stay at the network—producing a nightly 10:00 pm variety show titled The Jay Leno Show—and phoned ABC and Fox to inform them. Zucker and Ludwin planned to meet with O'Brien later to explain the deal, but as word leaked out to The New York Times, they decided to meet with him directly following that night's show. Following the meeting, Ross and O'Brien met with writers and mulled over the decision. O'Brien instantly felt uneasy, but as he was still in essence receiving The Tonight Show, he remained calm. The final episode of Late Night with Conan O'Brien aired on February 20, 2009, followed by The Tonight Show with Jay Leno on May 29. Much of O'Brien's entire staff moved cross-country to Los Angeles to prepare his version of The Tonight Show. He and his staff threw themselves into developing the program, but remained concerned regarding NBC's commitment to the new Tonight Show incarnation. Meanwhile, senior-level executives at NBC predicted that Leno's show would be roundly beaten by hour-long dramas on competing networks and cable, dooming the network's experiment.

In announcing his 10 pm show on The Tonight Show, Leno said, "People are asking me, 'What are you going to do after the last show? Are you going to go on vacation?' This kind of stuff. Actually, I'm going to a secluded spot where no one can find me: NBC primetime. As most of you know, we're not really leaving. We're coming back at 10 o'clock in September. It's a gamble. It's a gamble. I'm betting everything that NBC will still be around in 3 months! That is not a given!"

== Ratings ==
=== The Tonight Show and The Jay Leno Show debut ===
The Tonight Show with Conan O'Brien pulled in over nine million viewers to its June 1, 2009, premiere, doing extremely well in the coveted young demographics. Critics were generally very favorable; Tom Shales of The Washington Post, once critical of O'Brien, wrote that, "There's every indication that O'Brien will be up to the job of his illustrious predecessors." Each night, older audiences gradually turned off the program as it aired; seven episodes later, Letterman's show had edged above O'Brien's for the first time. While Zucker called O'Brien to reiterate that the generational change was expected, other executives were not as pleased. O'Brien and his team were not happy with the lack of promotion in the show's early weeks. Against the wishes of several PR executives, Zucker authorized a press release proclaiming O'Brien "the New King of Late Night", a move that attracted ridicule. Zucker later regretted the decision, and many at O'Brien's Tonight Show offices were displeased.

Over the following weeks, Zucker grew weary with O'Brien's performance and what he regarded as a booking of the wrong stars. When a controversy erupted over a joke Letterman told regarding politician Sarah Palin's family, Zucker eagerly pushed the O'Brien camp to bring her on their show, eyeing an opportunity to regain viewers and perhaps make it a turning point for a show not doing particularly well. O'Brien disliked the idea, finding it pandering to viewers that would alienate fans and the press, as well as hurt his relationship with Letterman. "This reaction drove Zucker nuts", wrote Bill Carter in The War for Late Night. "As a producer, he knew how to manipulate audiences—that was simply what you did as part of the job. [ ... ] As a boss, he couldn't believe Conan would stand in the way of what was obviously the smart business move—for him and his network." Meanwhile, Letterman continued to score higher ratings than O'Brien with regularity; his fall interview with U.S. President Barack Obama topped The Tonight Show by almost 5 million viewers, and the next week, a scandal involving attempted extortion and personal affairs made Letterman the talk of the country. By August, The Tonight Show was still losing to Letterman in total viewers, but, owing to O'Brien's appeal to a young audience, maintained its lead in the touted demographics.

Meanwhile, Leno was candid regarding his plans for his new show: "Even though it's ten o'clock, we're going to pretend it's eleven thirty." The Jay Leno Show premiered on September 14, 2009, featuring guests Jerry Seinfeld and Kanye West, shortly after West's infamous incident with Taylor Swift at the MTV Video Music Awards. The program racked up 17.7 million viewers, doing much better than O'Brien's Tonight Show debut in both overall numbers and young demographics. Some critics were harsh with Leno's program, with many viewing it as a rehash of the show he had just left. Mary McNamara of the Los Angeles Times said one of its sponsors' commercials was funnier than the show itself, saying, "This is the future of television? This wasn't even a good rendition of television past." By the show's second week, which saw it airing directly opposite season premieres, The Jay Leno Show saw its audience size fall to five million viewers. As the weeks wore on, producer Vickers noticed that NBC's plan—to save the best segments, such as Leno's signature "Headlines", for last in order to provide a strong lead-in for local news—was possibly hurting the program. One month in, Leno often only made third place, and executives became more uneasy.

=== Slipping numbers ===
Ratings for NBC affiliates' local news broadcasts at 11:00 pm began to slip by mid-October, especially on NBC owned-and-operated stations in the largest markets, creating high anxiety for the network. The Tonight Show still retained a slightly higher share of the coveted 18–34 demographic against Letterman, but saw those numbers slip even more when The Jay Leno Show began. Affiliates began to complain, and in addition to a domino effect on the local news, O'Brien, and his 12:30 am successor, Late Night with Jimmy Fallon, the disastrous ratings for Leno had damaged NBC's existing primetime lineups. This cascading effect caused by the lowered 10:00 pm lead-in was so significant that local NBC affiliate news viewership fell an average of twenty-five percent nationwide, with the decline in some markets being as high as fifty percent. By November, two months after the debut of The Jay Leno Show, ratings for The Tonight Show were brought down "roughly two million viewers a night year-to-year" from when Leno hosted the program. Clearing the 10:00 pm time period for Leno also damaged relations with the producers of scripted shows that previously occupied that slot, such as Dick Wolf of Law & Order. Leno offered an October 29 interview to Broadcasting & Cable where he stated he would return to his original 11:35 time slot if offered by NBC. When O'Brien's sidekick and announcer Andy Richter called the move less than "classy" in a chat with TV Squad, Leno called Ludwin to complain.

As most programs went into repeats in December, Leno's staff, notably Vickers, had focused on grabbing big-name guests for that month in an effort to save The Jay Leno Show; these efforts were cut short when she was informed they had "until the end of November". Affiliates began calling the network to inquire about the show's fate, and research analysis revealed O'Brien's drastically reduced median age for The Tonight Show—age 56 to 46—could possibly reflect that he was too "niche" for the earlier time. Any effort to take Leno off the air was halted by his contract, which had a highly unusual "pay-and-play" provision, in contrast to the typical "pay-or-play" agreement, which guaranteed NBC would both air his program and pay him for up to two years. On November 6, NBC chairman Jeff Gaspin received an email from the sales division with a suggestion to cancel O'Brien and reinstate Leno as host of The Tonight Show. Upon Gaspin's legal interpretation of Leno's contract, the option to simply move Leno back to The Tonight Show became relevant. When very poor ratings came in for the November sweeps period, affiliates became alarmed, and NBC board members demanded something be done regarding the 10:00 pm lead-in.

If something were not done by January, the affiliates reasoned, they would instate syndicated programming or move up their news broadcasts and pre-empt The Jay Leno Show. Ludwin, Gaspin, and Zucker kicked around possible solutions for their dilemma, such as cutting Leno to a few nights per week. In an attempt to alleviate the situation, Vickers moved the most popular comedy segments to the second act of The Jay Leno Show, moving their "10 at 10" segment later in the broadcast. Gaspin again received the suggestion to put Leno back at 11:35, and soon began working on a plan to cut The Jay Leno Show to a half-hour, leading into Conan's Tonight Show around midnight. From their perspective, the biggest casualty in this scenario would be Late Night with Jimmy Fallon, which would get bumped to 1 am. The reconfigured lineup could start in March 2010, following NBC's coverage of the Winter Olympics. Zucker preferred a plan for Leno to include an occasional guest and comedy piece, while Ebersol favored returning to the way it once was, with Leno at 11:35 and O'Brien at 12:35. Gaspin laid out his plan to Zucker one week before Christmas, but both agreed to wait it out for the new year, as to not "ruin anybody's holiday season".

== Conflict ==
=== Proposed changes ===
It struck Conan that Jay had played it well, in his passive-aggressive way, and wound up winning again. And maybe, in contrast, he himself had simply played it all wrong.

— Bill Carter, The War for Late Night

The plan moved forward after confirmation that O'Brien's contract did not guarantee a strict 11:35 pm start time (a loophole included primarily to accommodate sports pre-emptions and specials such as the network's New Year coverage). Gaspin planned to disclose the news to Leno first, and then, if all went well, inform O'Brien the following week. When Gaspin laid out the proposal to Leno and Vickers, the response was positive, even though they questioned how such a plan would work. Gaspin reasoned that the company was in a desperate situation, and he indicated his confidence that O'Brien would go along with the changes too. While Leno embraced the plan, Vickers was unnerved; without a guest or music act, she might have no studio audience, which could have disastrous consequences for Leno. In order to meet with O'Brien the following Monday, Gaspin was forced to cancel a meeting with the affiliate board, but promised them that by doing so, he would have an answer to the 10 pm problem that would be satisfactory to the board. After his January 6 show, O'Brien met with manager Gavin Polone to share his anxieties regarding the ratings: "I just think [Leno] is going to hurt me in some way."

News regarding Leno leaked to pop culture site FTV Live by the following morning, which was then picked up by national publications, including the Los Angeles Times and The New York Times. Gaspin scheduled an immediate meeting with Ross and O'Brien as soon as they arrived and explained the proposed changes. "I know how hard I worked for this", responded O'Brien. "It was promised to me. I had a shitty lead-in." Following the tense fifteen-minute meeting, O'Brien and Ross returned to the Tonight studio. TMZ reported on the story with a headline reading, "NBC Shakeup; Jay Leno Comes Out on Top." O'Brien called an emergency staff meeting and assured all that they had not been canceled and all would be fine. The TMZ story deeply bothered O'Brien owing to its timing soon after a story reporting The Jay Leno Show's cancellation, and he and Ross reasoned that they indeed were the last to be told of the changes.

By the following morning, O'Brien and Ross determined that they would have to leave NBC, and O'Brien opened that night's show with, "We've got a great show for you tonight—I have no idea what time it will air, but it's gonna be a great show." Polone viewed the move as a reactionary one by Zucker, concluding that he was acting in self-preservation, since network owner General Electric was in the process of negotiating the acquisition of NBC Universal by Comcast. When a story ran that night on The New York Times website that Fox had an "overt interest" in O'Brien and was not going along with the plan, Zucker reasoned that Polone was to blame. The situation became heated when Zucker placed a call to O'Brien's agent, Rick Rosen, inquiring on the story and demanding an immediate answer from the O'Brien camp. Gaspin spoke about the situation at a previously scheduled press conference that Sunday, noting that, "I obviously couldn't satisfy either with 100 percent of what they wanted. That's why I came up with this compromise." Zucker, upon hearing that O'Brien still did not take the proposal well, threatened Rosen, saying "I'm going to tell you right now that I can pay him or play him. I can ice you guys." On the following Monday's show, O'Brien continued jokes on the subject; responding to thunderous applause, he joked, "You keep that up, and this monologue won't start until 12:05."

=== "People of Earth" ===
Rosen suggested that O'Brien's camp hire litigation lawyer Patty Glaser to help grasp the situation. Following discussions on Leno's contract during a post-show conference, Glaser turned her attention to O'Brien for his opinion. He expressed his desire to write a statement describing his feelings on the matter, and after hearing what he would possibly say in such a statement, Glaser agreed to the idea, although Ross was initially reluctant. O'Brien went without sleep that night, crafting his statement obsessively. He returned to the studio the following morning, listening as the lawyers and Glaser read over the statement, which remained largely unchanged before publication. According to The War for Late Night, Glaser found "the statement as ideal for their purposes. It laid out Conan's point of view unequivocally, but without compromising his legal options. Nothing in there overtly said he was quitting, so he could not be accused of forsaking his contractual obligations."

O'Brien's press release went out mid-day on January 12, 2010, which he addressed to "People of Earth":

For 60 years the Tonight Show has aired immediately following the late local news. I sincerely believe that delaying the Tonight Show into the next day to accommodate another comedy program will seriously damage what I consider to be the greatest franchise in the history of broadcasting. The Tonight Show at 12:05 simply isn't the Tonight Show. [ ... ] So it has come to this: I cannot express in words how much I enjoy hosting this program and what an enormous personal disappointment it is for me to consider losing it. My staff and I have worked unbelievably hard and we are very proud of our contribution to the legacy of The Tonight Show. But I cannot participate in what I honestly believe is its destruction.

Public and media reaction to the press release was positive, with The New York Times stating O'Brien held Leno "personally responsible" for this conflict. According to The War for Late Night, "the 'People of Earth' letter—the manifesto, as NBC came to call it—changed the tone. This wasn't just Conan saying no; it was Conan saying no, and you're wrong, and, by the way, go fuck yourselves." A turning point in the conflict came on January 13, as O'Brien joked in his monologue that "I'm trying very hard to stay positive here, and I want to tell you something. This is honest. Hosting The Tonight Show has been the fulfillment of a lifelong dream for me. And I just want to say to the kids out there watching: You can do anything you want in life. Yeah, yeah—unless Jay Leno wants to do it, too." Following the joke, Leno called Gaspin, asking, "Why the fuck am I giving up a half hour for this guy?" Conversations changed to focus on what O'Brien would require to resolve the matter, and parties began to discuss a settlement.

== Reaction and media coverage ==
=== Public support for O'Brien ===
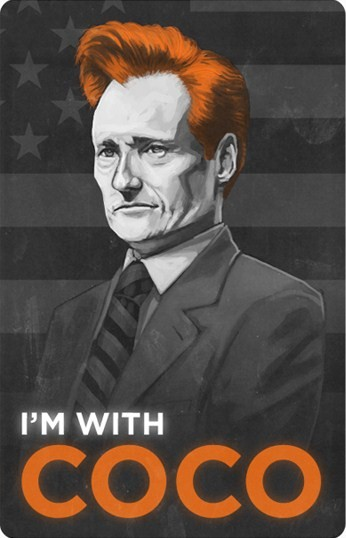
The "I'm With Coco" poster was widely circulated online and at rallies during the conflict.

Public reaction was overwhelmingly in favor of O'Brien during the conflict. In the days following the switch announcement, research of Twitter posts expressed support for O'Brien. Over one million people joined the two most prominent Facebook groups supporting O'Brien: "Team Conan" and "I'm With Coco", referring to an on-air nickname applied to O'Brien by actor Tom Hanks during his Tonight Show reign. Artist Mike Mitchell designed a poster similar to the Obama "Hope" poster, showing O'Brien superimposed with an American flag in the background and the caption "I'm With Coco". The poster was widely circulated and displayed online and at various rallies. The color orange also became the choice of color for O'Brien fans, referencing his light orange hair. O'Brien's overnight ratings began to shoot up (much to NBC's chagrin), and the viral support for O'Brien only increased by the week of his final shows.

Rallies in support of O'Brien were organized outside NBC studios across the U.S., notably in Los Angeles, Chicago, Seattle, and New York City. O'Brien briefly appeared at a January 18 rally outside the Tonight Show studio, after which he gave the crowd free pizza. Andy Richter and Tonight Show drummer Max Weinberg also made an appearance during the rally to speak to the crowd from atop the studio, and Tonight Show Band trombonist Richie "La Bamba" Rosenberg was driven around the crowd in a Popemobile-style vehicle. American Red Cross representatives were at a number of the rallies to collect money for the Haiti earthquake relief.

Many in Hollywood, including actors, comedians, and media personalities, expressed support for O'Brien. SNL's Seth Meyers addressed the controversy on the program's Weekend Update segment, joking that the conflict showed that "you don't need Cinemax to see someone get screwed on TV", and then proceeding to defend O'Brien. Meyers went on to sarcastically point out that if they did end up moving The Tonight Show, it would mean Late Night would end and host Jimmy Fallon would likely end up coming back to Update (and presumably reclaim his job from Meyers).

=== Criticism of Leno ===
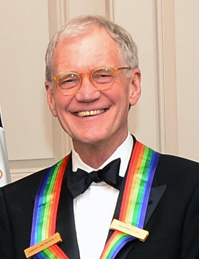
Long-time late night rival David Letterman was critical of Leno and supportive of his former mentee O'Brien.

Leno faced heated criticism and increasing negative publicity for his perceived role in the timeslot conflict, with some critics predicting that his reputation—along with those of Zucker and NBC—had been permanently damaged by the incident. Critics pointed to the 2004 Tonight Show clip wherein Leno claimed he would allow O'Brien to take over without incident. Actor and comedian Patton Oswalt was among the first celebrities to openly voice disappointment with Leno, saying, "Comedians who don't like Jay Leno now, and I'm one of them, we're not like, 'Jay Leno sucks'; it's that we're so hurt and disappointed that one of the best comedians of our generation... willfully has shut the switch off." Rosie O'Donnell was among O'Brien's most vocal and vehement supporters, calling Leno a "bully". Radio personality Howard Stern was a harsh critic of Leno before and after the timeslot change announcement; in a 2006 appearance on Late Night, Stern told O'Brien that he felt it was unlikely that Leno would ever willingly give up Tonight to anyone. The 67th Golden Globe Awards, which NBC aired on January 17 during O'Brien's settlement negotiations, featured numerous jokes on the controversy by Tina Fey and Tom Hanks, as well as show host Ricky Gervais who quipped, "Let's get on with it before NBC replaces me with Jay Leno."

Additional criticism stemmed from the fact that the circumstances in which O'Brien found himself recalled a similar dilemma that faced Leno toward the end of 1992. Only months into his hosting job on The Tonight Show, NBC considered reversing their decision of having chosen Leno over Letterman. Leno was aghast and angry that NBC refused to exhibit clear commitment to him as the franchise's new host, and expressed this disappointment publicly. He also made explicit that he would leave the network if he was asked to move back an hour to accommodate Letterman.

Commentators also faulted Leno for what they perceived as a disingenuous attempt on the host's part to forge an "everyman" persona in the way he carried himself throughout the controversy. During the episode of The Jay Leno Show that aired after it was made public that Leno had been offered the 11:35 time slot back, Leno portrayed himself as an ingenuous employee merely following NBC's instructions, making a point of stating, "I don't have a manager, I don't have an agent" and referring to his preference of making direct, "handshake" deals. Despite his claim of having no representation, Leno retained an agent (Steve Levine of International Creative Management), a publicist, and entertainment lawyers.

Comedian Bill Burr found that Leno's ambition to take back The Tonight Show was less objectionable than his "passive-aggressive" behavior and the "powerless" public image Leno put forth instead of "owning up" to his maneuverings. Burr argued that NBC "never gave [Conan] The Tonight Show" in terms of network support, saying, "When Jay got The Tonight Show, he didn't have to follow Johnny [Carson] bombing for an hour. [ ... ] Leno struggled for eighteen months before he got going, and he got to go on after a hit show."

Comedian Jeff Garlin accused NBC of being "cheap", suggesting that the network tempted O'Brien with his dream job of hosting The Tonight Show because they did not want him to go to a competitor, but neither did they want to match what the competitors were offering. Garlin accused Leno of undermining O'Brien's incipient Tonight Show by taking the 10 pm slot. Garlin stated that while Leno had been nice to him over the years, the host displayed "no character" by taking the timeslot back. Garlin vowed never to appear on Leno's Tonight Show thereafter.

In an essay for The Wall Street Journal, Nathan Rabin wrote that the response to Leno's role was "quick, vitriolic and widespread". Bill Zehme, the co-author of Leno's autobiography Leading with My Chin, told the Los Angeles Times, "The thing Leno should do is walk, period. He's got everything to lose in terms of public popularity by going back. People will look at him differently. He'll be viewed as the bad guy." Joe Queenan from The Wall Street Journal went further in his criticism of Leno, jokingly comparing the controversy to Adolf Hitler's annexation of Czechoslovakia.

David Letterman was one of the more adamant critics of NBC and Leno's handling of the conflict. He noted that, "We went through our own version of this seventeen, eighteen years ago", and he ridiculed Leno's recent "state of the network address", wherein Leno pleaded for viewers not to "blame Conan", with Letterman noting, "In the thousands and thousands of words that have been printed about this mess, who has blamed Conan? No one!"

Jon Stewart of Comedy Central's The Daily Show reflected on the controversy, saying, "At least we don't have to deal with Jeff Zucker. That guy's like the Cheney of television, shooting shows in the face." Stewart also shouted "Team Conan" as his "Moment of Zen" at the end of the January 21 episode of The Daily Show. Stephen Colbert of Comedy Central's The Colbert Report asked guest Morgan Freeman to read a list of "untrustworthy things", one of which paraphrased a statement made by Leno in 2004, "Conan: The 11:30 slot? Yours."

Fellow late-night host Jimmy Kimmel performed an entire show in character as Leno.

Jimmy Kimmel, host of the ABC late night show Jimmy Kimmel Live!, donned a gray wig and fake chin to perform his entire January 12 show in character as Leno. With his bandleader Cleto Escobedo parodying Leno's bandleader Kevin Eubanks, Kimmel began his monologue with, "It's good to be here on ABC. Hey, Cleto, you know what ABC stands for? Always Bump Conan." He also referenced the "People of Earth" letter, noting how O'Brien declined to participate in the "destruction" of The Tonight Show, commenting as Leno that, "Fortunately, though, I will! I'll burn it down if I have to!" Leno called Kimmel the next morning to discuss the bit, and at the end of the call, Leno suggested Kimmel come over and appear on his show. When his booking department called to confirm his appearance on a "10 at 10" segment (in which Leno asked ten questions to a guest appearing remotely via satellite), Kimmel agreed immediately. When he received the questions for his January 14 appearance—such as "What's your favorite snack junk food?"—he realized Leno intended to neutralize the scathing parody and paint the two as friends.

Kimmel, however, was upfront with wanting to discuss the fiasco at hand, and during his appearance attempted to steer the questions that way; when asked about his favorite prank, he responded, "I think the best prank I ever pulled was, I told a guy once, 'Five years from now I'm going to give you my show.' And then when the five years came, I gave it to him and I took it back, almost instantly." Later in the segment, when Leno asked, "Ever order anything off the TV?" Kimmel replied, "Like when NBC ordered your show off the TV?"

Following similar remarks to more questions, Kimmel closed the segment with this comment: "Listen, Jay. Conan and I have children. All you have to take care of is cars! We have lives to lead here! You've got eight hundred million dollars! For God's sakes, leave our shows alone!" Leno never fought back and accepted the bit as comedy (he ascribed it as Kimmel attempting to score some publicity), but producer Vickers was furious.

Kimmel discussed the appearance during an interview with Marc Maron for the latter's podcast in 2012. Kimmel stated that he felt O'Brien was not given a proper chance, but that he was also motivated by his own history with Leno. According to Kimmel, Leno had some years prior been in serious discussions with ABC about the possibility of jumping ship from NBC. During this period, Leno initiated a friendship with Kimmel, wanting to ensure that they would be on good terms if the move was made, given that under that scenario, Leno would have taken Kimmel's time slot and become his lead-in. However, after Leno made the arrangement to remain at NBC, "those conversations were gone", according to Kimmel. Realizing that Leno's relationship with him had been artificial, Kimmel felt "worked over", reasoning that Leno was using the ABC discussions as a bargaining tactic to try to get his old job back.

=== Neutrality of Jimmy Fallon ===
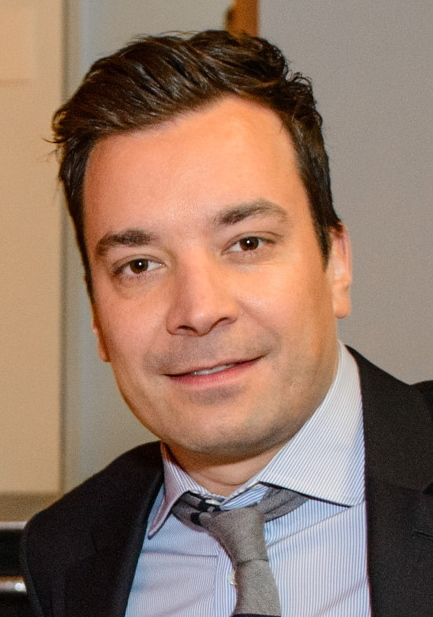
At the time of the conflict, comedian Jimmy Fallon hosted the slot after The Tonight Show, Late Night with Jimmy Fallon.

The only late night host who remained neutral was Jimmy Fallon, calling O'Brien and Leno "two of my heroes and two of my friends". He later joked that, "There's been three hosts of Late Night: David Letterman, Conan O'Brien, and me. And if there's one thing I've learned from Dave and Conan, it's that hosting this show is a one-way ticket to not hosting The Tonight Show." Ironically, four years later, Fallon was selected to replace the retiring Leno as host of The Tonight Show in February 2014.

=== Defense of Leno and criticism of O'Brien ===
Speaking to The Hollywood Reporter, Jerry Seinfeld rebuffed the idea that NBC deserved blame and chastised O'Brien for pointing fingers:

"What did the network do to him?" Seinfeld asked. "I don't think anyone's preventing people from watching Conan. Once they give you the cameras, it's on you. I can't blame NBC for having to move things around. I hope Conan stays, I think he's terrific. But there's no rules in show business, there's no [referees]."

The irony of Seinfeld's stance was noted by at least one publication, as Seinfeld had itself weathered a rocky beginning thanks to the patience of NBC executive Rick Ludwin, the benefit of a strong lead-in (Cheers), and years to develop its audience as opposed to O'Brien's six months.

Jim Norton, who was a frequent contributor to Leno's shows, touched on the controversy repeatedly in interviews and on The Opie & Anthony Show, calling the harsh criticism of Leno "amazing" and suggesting that Leno declining to walk away after stating otherwise was no worse than O'Brien "actually trying to force Jay out by telling the agents, 'If Conan doesn't get The Tonight Show, he's leaving the network.'" Chris Rock defended Leno during a 2010 interview on The Howard Stern Show, claiming, "Leno did not fuck over Conan" and that "Conan was screwed by his management and his agent" by accepting Leno's 10:00 pm show as O'Brien's lead-in.

NBC executives served as Leno's chief defenders, with Dick Ebersol, chairman of NBC Universal Sports, being particularly aggressive. Calling Leno's detractors "chicken-hearted and gutless", he summarized the late night situation as an "astounding failure" by O'Brien and further characterized O'Brien's and Letterman's barbed jokes about their rival as "professional jealousy". Addressing the common point about Conan's weak lead-in hurting his ability to build an audience in a different timeslot, Ebersol dismissed it as a "specious argument."

In an interview with Marc Maron that summer, O'Brien's longtime sidekick Andy Richter noted the contradiction between Ebersol's comments and the actions of the network. The demonstrable impact of The Jay Leno Show on the ratings of local news across the country was the direct cause of the cancellation of The Jay Leno Show, and gave lie to Ebersol's implication that lead-ins are irrelevant. Leno's Tonight Show, in contrast, had always enjoyed healthy lead-ins courtesy of a strong NBC primetime line-up. Furthermore, the network would have reportedly faced a US$150 million penalty in order to release Leno from his contract, making O'Brien the far less expensive host to get rid of.

Leno himself was among O'Brien's harshest critics, calling O'Brien's numbers "destructive to the franchise" despite O'Brien's success in the advertiser-friendly demographics combined with his significantly smaller salary. Moreover, Leno's assessment of O'Brien's performance less than three months prior had been significantly different: "Personally, I think Conan is doing fine. He's beating Dave in the demo, maybe not in the popular one right now because Dave has a lot of other things going that have people watching for whatever reason, so I think that's not really a fair thing. It's a little too early to tell."

== Settlement ==
=== Negotiations ===
Discussions neared completion regarding a financial settlement by January 14, and were expected to be in place following O'Brien's final week of shows—January 18–22—a concession O'Brien pushed to give his program a proper farewell. Movement on the settlement slowed when run by GE executives, then-owners of NBC Universal. NBC had several requests, among those that he not bring Howard Stern on the show his final week (which the O'Brien camp found slightly comical) and that they see the show's final week of scripts (which O'Brien never sent). With talks for much of the rest of the week going nowhere, a Saturday New York Post story ran alleging that O'Brien's staff felt "betrayed" by his actions for putting them out of work because of his refusal to accept the 12:05 timeslot; however, nearly all of O'Brien's staff had actually agreed that he should leave the network, and the argument that O'Brien was responsible for his staff being out of work came straight from an NBC executive. Therefore, O'Brien was infuriated by the story, which he figured was the result of a direct plant from NBC. He was appalled that NBC challenged his character, as stressing severance for his employees was enormously important to him. (He had paid them out of his own pocket during the writers' strike three years earlier).

NBC added more requests, which the O'Brien camp refused as unreasonable, such as the right to pull any of his final shows if the network objected to the content (e.g., a joke about the conflict/NBC). GE chairman Jeffrey Immelt questioned why they were paying so much for a performer destined to run to another network. Negotiations continued into O'Brien's final week; he could not confirm on-air it was indeed his final week of shows, which produced difficulty in booking the guests he desired for his final show. On January 19, multiple media outlets reported that O'Brien and NBC were close to signing a deal between US$30 and US$40 million for the host to walk away from the network. Following his January 20 episode, O'Brien remained at the studio until the early morning hours, alongside executive producer Jeff Ross and the legal counsel, trying to finalize the settlement. O'Brien wandered off, playing his guitar alone and stepping out on the deserted Universal lot at midnight, attempting to make sense of the situation. O'Brien signed the agreement that night, and the next day, its terms were made public.

In all, O'Brien received a US$45 million deal to leave NBC. He received pay for the remaining two years of his contract (amounting to US$33 million), with additional payments to Ross, Richter, and Weinberg. The severance pay for his staff was around US$12 million, which O'Brien had stressed. O'Brien paid around fifty stagehands and various crew members at least six weeks severance pay out of his own pocket, as NBC gave those particular staffers nothing in the settlement. The International Alliance of Theatrical Stage Employees said that they were "very happy" with how O'Brien treated their union members during the conflict. The contract contained a clause prohibiting O'Brien from making negative remarks about NBC for a certain amount of time; it did not, however, contain the previously rumored "mitigation clause", in which NBC would be able to keep some of the severance pay after O'Brien found a new network. It stipulated that he could return to television on another network no earlier than September 1, 2010.

=== Final week ===
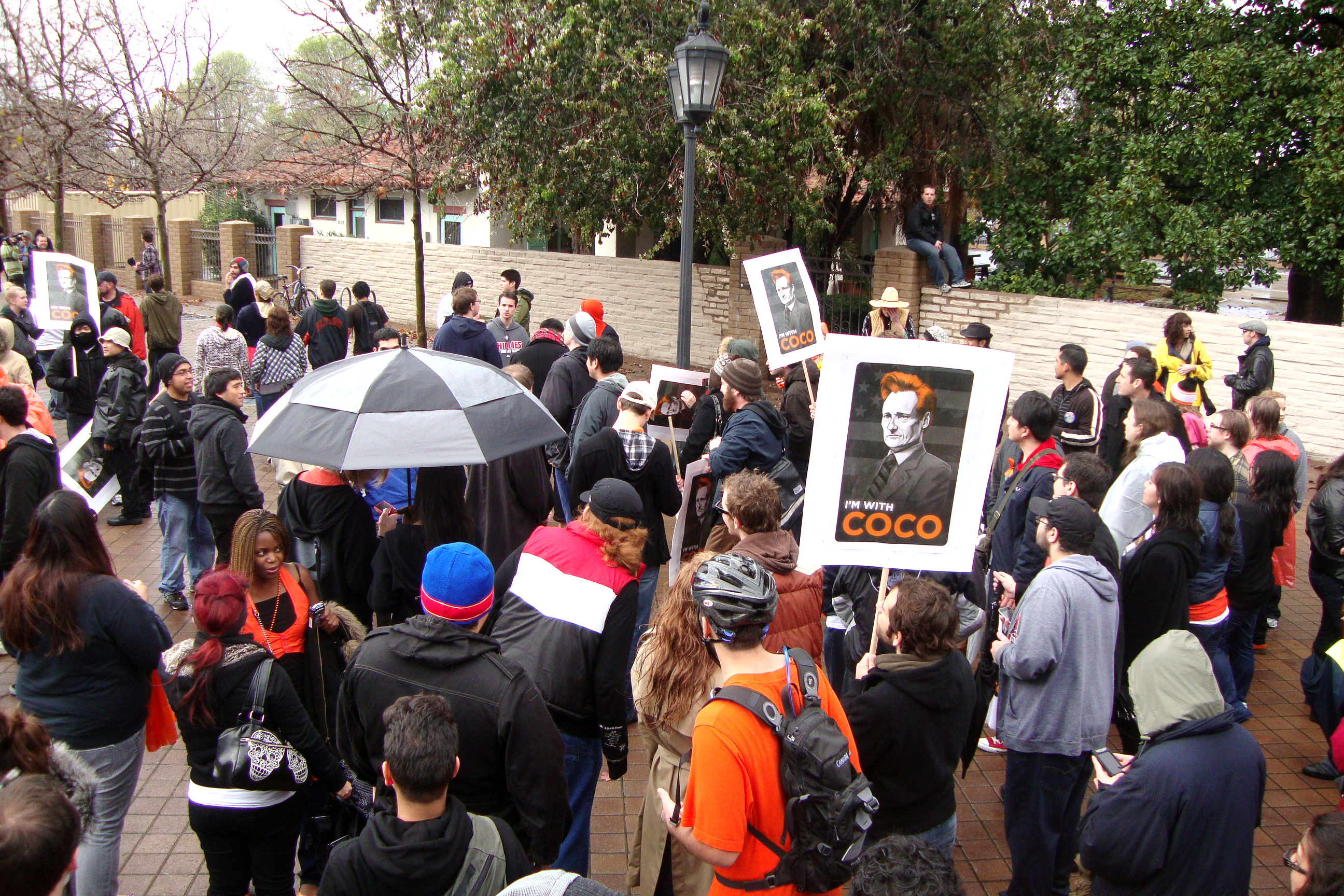
Supporters of Conan O'Brien rally outside Universal Studios in Los Angeles

The conflict only provided more comedy material for O'Brien's Tonight Show during its final episodes. Among other bits, O'Brien put the show up for sale on Craigslist, and then himself; looked back at clips from the show's seven-month tenure that were dubbed "Classic Tonight Show Moments"; and designed a bit to seem as though he were spending absurd amounts of NBC's money, such as customizing a Bugatti Veyron, playing audio and video clips with expensive rebroadcast rights, and using a purported "rare ground sloth" to spray Beluga caviar on what was presented as an original Picasso. Because the segments aired in days immediately following the 2010 Haiti earthquake while national fundraising efforts (including some spearheaded by NBC) were ongoing, O'Brien received criticism for wasting resources. In response to the outcry over the expense of these sketches, O'Brien explained that the segments were indeed jokes, and many of the props were either counterfeits or borrowed in exchange for promotional consideration.

The guest roster for O'Brien's final show on January 22—Tom Hanks, Steve Carell (who did an exit interview of O'Brien in-character as an NBC employee and shredded Conan's ID badge), and original first guest Will Ferrell—was regarded by O'Brien as a "dream lineup"; in addition, Neil Young performed his song "Long May You Run" and, as the show closed, was joined by O'Brien, Beck, Ferrell (dressed as Ronnie Van Zant), Billy Gibbons, Ben Harper, Viveca Paulin, and The Tonight Show Band to perform the Lynyrd Skynyrd song "Free Bird".

In his final moments on air, O'Brien stated that between SNL, Late Night and The Tonight Show, he had worked for NBC for over twenty years, and he was "enormously proud of the work [they] have done together". He then thanked NBC for the first time since announcing his intention to quit. O'Brien said his decision was "the hardest thing [he] ever had to do". He praised and gave thanks to his staff, and thanked his fans for their overwhelming support (especially those who participated in the Los Angeles rally during periods of heavy rain). He ended the show by offering heartfelt advice to his viewers in his farewell address, stating:

All I ask of you is one thing ... I ask this particularly of the young people who watch. Please don't be cynical. I hate cynicism. For the record, it's my least favorite quality and it doesn't lead anywhere. Nobody in life gets exactly what they thought they were going to get. But if you work really hard and you're kind, amazing things will happen. I'm telling you, amazing things will happen.

Following the taping, the studio set was used one final time for a party thrown by staff. O'Brien's monologue spot from the floor was framed and signed by his staff as a gift, which touched O'Brien. 10.3 million people watched the final episode of The Tonight Show with Conan O'Brien, a notably high number for live late-night viewing and on a Friday night. The final episode scored a 7.0 household rating and a 4.4 rating in the 18–49 demo. Not only did O'Brien's final show beat all late night competition, it outscored all prime time shows in the 18–49 demo from that night and the night before. The network confirmed that Leno would officially resume as host of The Tonight Show on March 1, and reruns from O'Brien's time as host aired until NBC began airing the Winter Olympics on February 15.

Leno's first Tonight Show back pulled in 6.6 million viewers, and his margin over Letterman again held for much of the rest of his run until his second Tonight Show departure in 2014. While his numbers were down from his original incarnation of The Tonight Show, "It's as if a collective erase button was pushed", said Robert Thompson, professor of television at Syracuse University, "with the usual suspects back in their usual locations—except Conan is gone."

== Impact ==
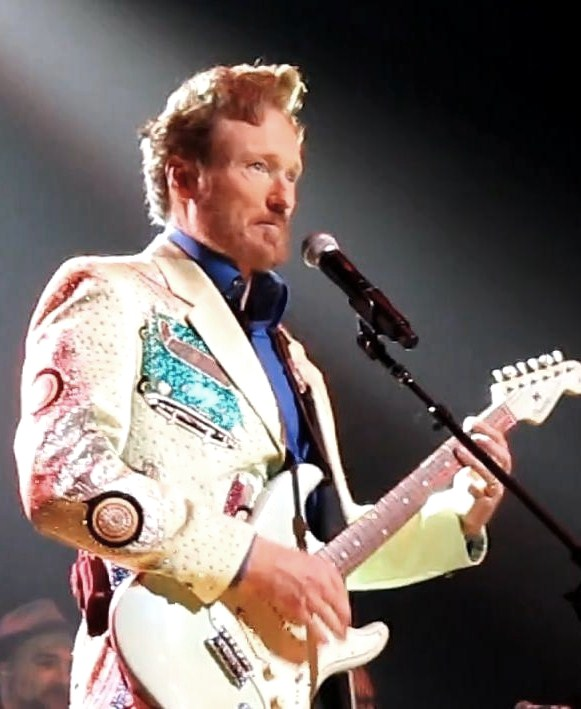
O'Brien performing a cover of "I Will Survive" on the first day of his tour in Eugene, Oregon

According to NBC, if O'Brien continued hosting, it would have been the first year that The Tonight Show would have actually lost money, which Leno later contended was damaging to the franchise. This assertion was scorned by skeptical critics, as it was calculated that Conan's Tonight Show would have made significantly more money in advertising than Leno's show did, due to his more favorable youth demographic numbers. In addition, higher production costs and higher salaries would have by all accounts made Leno's Tonight Show more costly. O'Brien and Ross also challenged this notion, concluding that to arrive at such a calculation, NBC must have included the cost of building the new studio and offices, as well as startup costs. At NBC, most young employees tended to support O'Brien and joined the "I'm with Coco" Facebook groups; NBC later asked all employees to rescind their membership in any O'Brien-supporting pages. Similar action came when NBC removed reruns of O'Brien's The Tonight Show from NBC.com and Hulu.

Gaspin was happy with the settlement, but nevertheless agreed with one of O'Brien's points—that his show had no time to grow: "Could it have grown? Absolutely ... We just couldn't give him the time." Zucker, in an interview with Charlie Rose, defended his strategy but noted that both moving Leno to primetime and giving O'Brien the Tonight Show was a mistake. In addition, he stated that he received death threats due to his role in the conflict. Zucker, who had known O'Brien since their days at Harvard University and was very close friends with Ross, was very disappointed with how events played out, although he viewed it as necessary. Leno, in an attempt to repair his public perception, granted an interview to Oprah Winfrey on January 25; he stripped himself of any blame for O'Brien's disappointment, noting that it was all about ratings, and also confirmed that he told a "white lie" in 2004 when he guaranteed The Tonight Show to O'Brien. In a reference to a 2007 Super Bowl commercial starring Letterman and Winfrey (the two had feuded for years prior), Letterman, Leno, and Winfrey all appeared in a spot airing during Super Bowl XLIV in February 2010. The ad—Letterman's idea—was the first time the late-night hosts had met since their own 1992 debacle. In it, Letterman and Leno sit on opposite sides of Winfrey watching the game; Letterman deems it "the worst Super Bowl party ever" due to Leno's inclusion, and Winfrey tells him to "be nice", resulting in Leno quipping, "Oh, he's just saying that 'cause I'm here." The clip stirred a frenzy, with commentators speculating that Leno had been "green-screened" into the picture.

Letterman had initially wanted O'Brien to be in the promo as well, but O'Brien firmly rejected it, saying, "No fucking way I'm doing that. It's not a joke to me—it's real." O'Brien was sure his agreement prohibited television appearances for several months, but gathered NBC would be only too happy to allow him a one-time reprieve for the ad, as it was to improve Leno's image. O'Brien, by this point, was planning a live tour with his staff that would take him on the road, and had also created a Twitter account. After about one hour online, O'Brien's number of Twitter followers had rocketed past the 30,000 followers of the official Jay Leno account, and he held over 300,000 followers in under 24 hours; he surpassed the one million mark in May 2010. Many speculated that O'Brien would sign a deal with Fox for a late-night program; Comedy Central and HBO had also expressed interest in O'Brien. Fox's deal moved slowly and they eventually withdrew their offer due to station resistance, the daunting financial investment, and opposition from Roger Ailes.

O'Brien eventually signed with cable network TBS in April, with his next program, Conan, set to debut in November. The move prompted industry surprise; online blog Vulture commented that, "Conan will now be featured as a lead-in for Lopez Tonight on TBS. It's not just basic cable, it's unsexy basic cable." His nationwide comedy tour, The Legally Prohibited from Being Funny on Television Tour, began on April 12 and ran through June 14.

A documentary shot during that time, Conan O'Brien Can't Stop, as well as a May 60 Minutes interview, prompted some observers to deem him "whiny". Vanity Fair's James Wolcott said O'Brien "came off as a peevish straw of nervous energy ... a self-involved chatterbox." However, many others had positive reactions to the documentary with The Hollywood Reporter stating, "The late-night host is funnier than ever in a thoroughly entertaining doc about his post-"Tonight Show" tour", and Roger Ebert saying, "after the movie, I rather admired him. What we are seeing is a man determined to vindicate himself after a public humiliation. People attend his shows, cheer him, like him. That proves something." The documentary was "certified fresh" on Rotten Tomatoes.

As NBC could have potentially retained intellectual property originating from O'Brien's entire seventeen-year tenure with the network, O'Brien simply changed names on the tour (turning his character, the Masturbating Bear, into the "Self-Pleasuring Panda"). The Washington Post later reported that retaining the characters was "not a key issue for O'Brien".

== Aftermath ==
Conan premiered in November 2010 to 4 million viewers, leading all late-night talk shows and more than tripling the audience of its direct competition, The Daily Show and The Colbert Report on Comedy Central. However, ratings quickly fell; by the following fall, the show averaged 1 million viewers in the 18–49 demographic. In an effort to bolster ratings, TBS secured the cable syndication rights to The Big Bang Theory at a reported US$2 million per episode to serve as a lead-in to Conan three nights a week. Steve Koonin of Turner Entertainment stated in 2012 that Conan is the "centerpiece of TBS". The Hollywood Reporter credited it with forging "a digital empire, his company's own shows and a young audience TBS hopes will follow him anywhere." TBS announced in May 2017 that they had renewed the show through 2022. However, despite the show renewal, it was announced in November 2020 that the show would end in June 2021, with O'Brien producing a weekly variety show for HBO Max. His final show aired on June 24, 2021, with a montage of clips from his shows along with an extended farewell monologue.

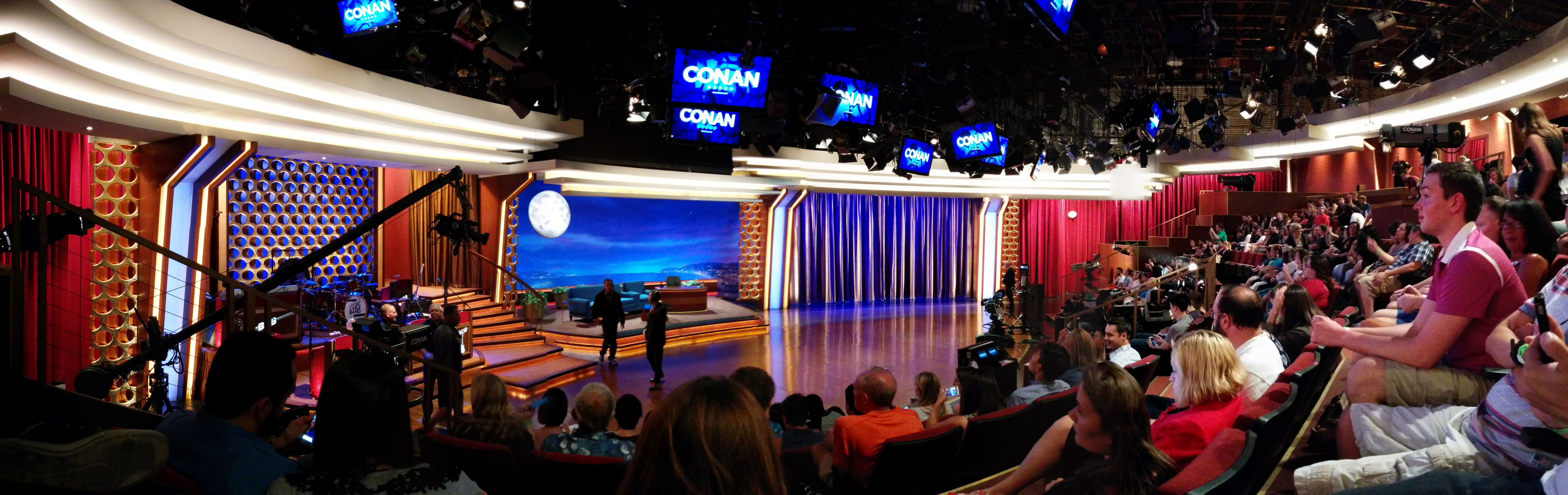
The studios for Conan at the Warner Bros. Studios, which aired on TBS from 2010 until 2021

Many of the executives involved in the botched transition subsequently left NBC. Zucker was fired by Comcast Executive Vice President Steve Burke, but he stressed that Comcast's insistence to install their own team was the reason. West Coast business operations executive Marc Graboff opted to leave his contract early, as did programming executive Jeff Gaspin. While O'Brien admitted in 2012 that he occasionally still felt resentment over the events that transpired, he noted that "I had an amazing partnership with NBC and was very disappointed at the outcome". He has had no contact with Leno, noting "the odds are we will both leave this Earth without speaking to each other, which is fine. There's really nothing to say. We both know the deal. He knows; I know. I'd rather just forget." In a 2010 issue of TV Guide, the timeslot conflict ranked No. 1 on a list of TV's biggest "blunders".

A wax likeness of O'Brien that had been commissioned by NBC Universal from Madame Tussauds and unveiled during a December 2009 episode of The Tonight Show with Conan O'Brien was quietly returned to the Madame Tussauds museum on Hollywood Boulevard. The figure had originally been intended to permanently reside in the "NBC Universal Experience" theme park attraction. A remote segment produced a few months into O'Brien's TBS show saw the host humorously reuniting with the wax statue.

On October 5, 2011, O'Brien returned to 30 Rockefeller Plaza for a surprise, scripted appearance on Late Night with Jimmy Fallon to ceremonially retrieve the Triumph the Insult Comic Dog puppet from the studio after NBC had finally granted him the rights to use the character on TBS's Conan. During the two-and-a-half minute bit, O'Brien and Fallon joked about the controversy when Fallon said, "You were [host of Late Night] for sixteen years. Then what happened?" to which O'Brien laughed and said, "Don't you worry about that. You're a young guy."

During his 2012 appearance on the Late Show with David Letterman, O'Brien made it clear that he held no animosity toward NBC, pointing out that the individual executives he clashed with had departed the network shortly after he did due to a regime change. Indeed, O'Brien would occasionally show clips from his NBC shows on his TBS program with NBC's permission, and the network also allowed the character of Triumph the Insult Comic Dog to appear on the TBS show as well, with Triumph's performer Robert Smigel explaining that NBC only stands to gain by allowing him to give their property exposure. In an interview on CNN's Piers Morgan Live, also in 2012, O'Brien acknowledged that in retrospect the plan to engineer a transition for The Tonight Show five years in advance was "absurd", though he noted that he never anticipated Leno's ratings would fall in that interim, as the press had sometimes intimated, and he pointed out that all previous Tonight Show hosts had departed when they were on top in the ratings. He further remarked that he was happier in his current situation at TBS where he feels "liberated" and can do the material he wants without the baggage of upholding a legacy.

In 2013, O'Brien was the headline performer invited to give remarks at the White House Correspondents' Dinner, and the Tonight Show controversy was humorously alluded to throughout the evening. During his own speech, President Barack Obama quipped, "I understand that when the Correspondents' Association was considering Conan for this gig, they were faced with that age-old dilemma: Do you offer it to him now, or wait for five years and then give it to Jimmy Fallon?" O'Brien himself referenced the affair with a joke that complimented President Obama on job creation: "Since [Obama] was first elected, the number of popes has doubled, and the number of Tonight Show hosts has tripled." Later that year, O'Brien was chosen to host Carson on TCM, a series that re-aired classic interviews from The Tonight Show Starring Johnny Carson.

In 2014, Leno was interviewed for a 60 Minutes episode that focused on the host's second and permanent departure from The Tonight Show desk. Leno expressed to Steve Kroft that he had been "blindsided" in 2004 when NBC executives asked him to relinquish The Tonight Show in five years' time, though he admitted that he had accepted the decision with no argument or inquiry. In spite of this and the public remarks Leno had made at the time blessing O'Brien's succession, both Leno and his wife Mavis characterized The Tonight Show as having been taken from the incumbent host, rather than being something that he had voluntarily surrendered. When Leno explained that he was more willing to step aside the second time due to the considerable talent of Fallon and because "talented people will only wait so long before they get other opportunities", Kroft pointed out that Leno had said very similar things about O'Brien years before. "Well, maybe I did, yeah," admitted Leno before joking, "Well, we'll see what happens." During a 2015 interview with Howard Stern, O'Brien explained that he prefers to avoid talking about the "craziness", stating that people in show business shouldn't complain. He also claimed that even in hindsight he does not regret doing five more years of Late Night instead of moving to Fox, nor does he regret his incarnation of The Tonight Show.

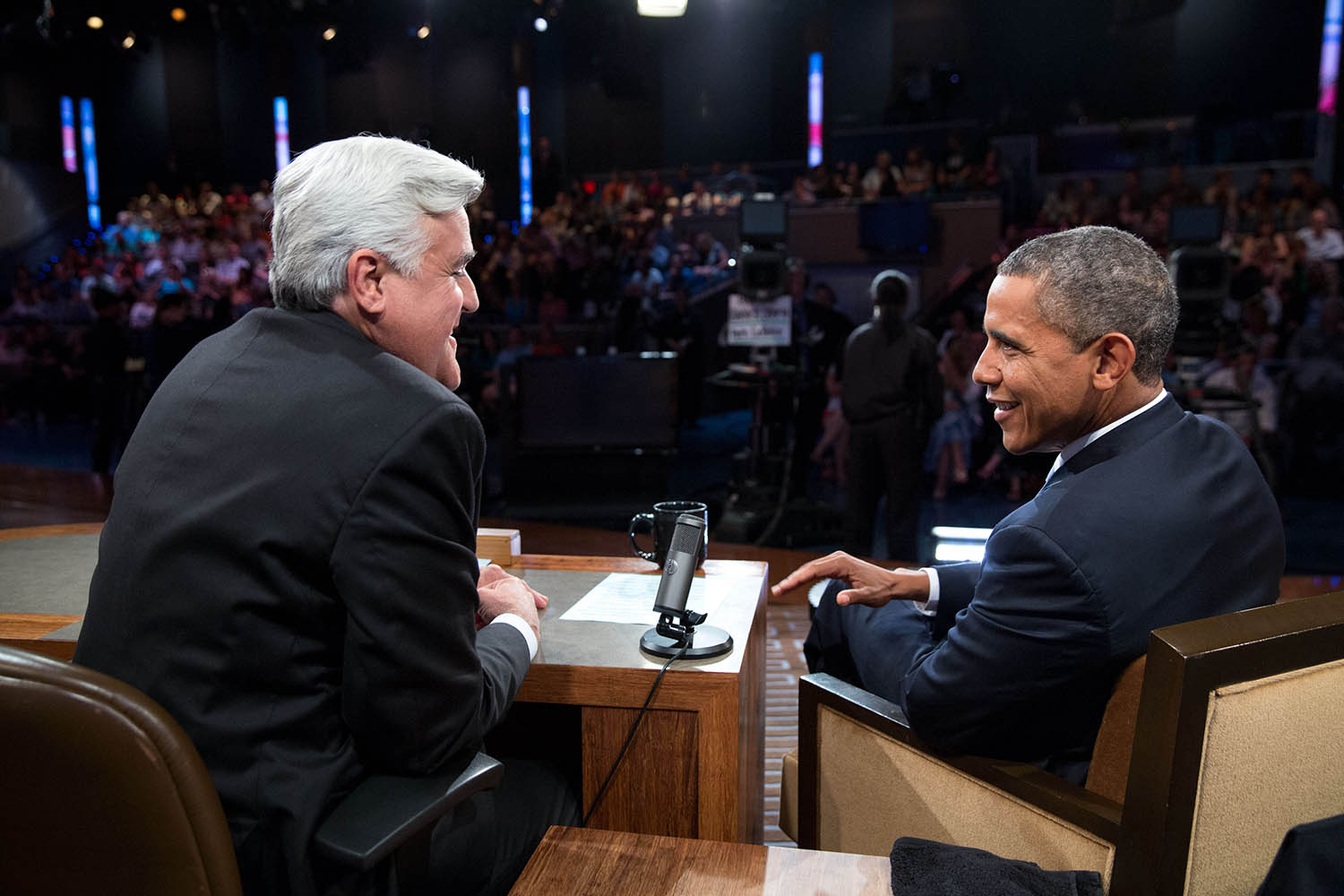
Leno interviewing Barack Obama during his second stint of hosting The Tonight Show in August 2013.

Leno hosted his second incarnation of The Tonight Show until February 2014, when Jimmy Fallon took over the hosting duties. Fallon's credibility with younger viewers and presence online was why NBC instituted the change, which was announced only three years following O'Brien's departure. During the show that aired the day of the announcement, O'Brien congratulated Fallon, stating, "Jimmy is the perfect guy to do it, and he's gonna do a fantastic job." Though NBC had made a considerable effort to scrub any references to O'Brien's brief tenure as The Tonight Show host both on-air and online, with one former blogger for NBC Sports noting a corporate policy banning any mention of O'Brien, it was acknowledged by the network during the buildup to the 2014 transition from Leno to Fallon. A brief shot of O'Brien walking onto his Tonight set was displayed in an on-air promo chronicling the franchise's history, and Fallon referenced the conflict on his first Tonight Show episode, when he opened the show by joking:

I'm Jimmy Fallon, and I'll be your host—for now. Of course, I wouldn't be here tonight if it weren't for the previous Tonight Show hosts, so I want to say thank you to Steve Allen, Jack Paar, Johnny Carson, Jay Leno, Conan O'Brien and Jay Leno.

Leno appeared on The Arsenio Hall Show on February 26, 2014, as a surprise guest to deliver the news that the revived program had been renewed by CBS Television Distribution for a second season. This proved to be premature, however, as Hall's program was indeed canceled on May 30, 2014.

Comedian Bill Maher paid tribute to Leno when the latter was inducted into the Television Hall of Fame, an honor bestowed upon the host in 2014 when he stepped down from The Tonight Show a second time. A longtime friend of Leno, Maher complained that Leno was "victimized" by the press during the NBC fiasco. In a 2015 interview, Leno reiterated his stance that O'Brien's own performance led to his ouster from 11:35 and that he remained mystified by the suggestion that he should have refused the time slot when it was offered back to him, saying "Why? Because Conan and I were good friends? No. At that point ... it's a business decision. I'm sure it could have been handled differently. But I think it was a matter of letting things take its course. If Conan's ratings would have been fine, it wouldn't have been an issue. It wouldn't have come up." In 2017, Leno again absolved himself, instead emphasizing that he kept The Tonight Show number one after his return; he also addressed with equivocation the longstanding claim that his contract was the more expensive one to break: "I mean, if I'm that smart, how did I lose the show in the first place?"

When he took over Tonight, Fallon insisted that Leno is welcome to appear on the show anytime he wishes, saying, "Whenever he wants, he's got a stage." Leno made his first appearance as a guest on November 7, 2014, and has appeared several more times since. Additionally, Leno has since appeared on Late Night with Seth Meyers and The Late Late Show with Craig Ferguson.

On February 13, 2015, Robert Smigel appeared in character as Triumph the Insult Comic Dog on The Tonight Show Starring Jimmy Fallon to promote The Jack and Triumph Show. During the interview, he joked about the conflict to a visibly nervous Fallon: "Listen, we love NBC. NBC... we kid, you know? NBC will always be the place where Jack and I got our start. And where they fucked Conan."

As the controversy grew distant with time, formal acknowledgement of O'Brien's lengthy career at NBC became more common by the network. In 2017, mention was made of the host in NBC's 90th Anniversary Special, and a display for him among all Tonight Show hosts appears in the ride queue of the Race Through New York Starring Jimmy Fallon theme park attraction at Universal Studios Florida.

In conjunction with his 25th anniversary as a late-night host, it was announced that O'Brien, TBS and NBC had come to an arrangement that would allow the entirety of O'Brien's late night archive (with the exception of musical performances, which posed music licensing issues), totaling over four thousand episodes, to become available in January 2019 via a state-of-the-art website dubbed "Conan 25". The launch would have marked the first time O'Brien's NBC programs were made legally available since The Tonight Show conflict. On June 15, 2021, in one of the final episodes of Conan, guest Martin Short alluded to the controversy by asking O'Brien if his to-be-announced guest for the final week was going to be Leno. After a surprised prolonged reaction from the audience and laughter from O'Brien and Richter, O'Brien joked, "I keep calling; I keep calling him and he doesn't answer. Someone's like, [using Jay Leno impersonation voice] "eh he's not here right now."

O'Brien made his first appearance on The Tonight Show Starring Jimmy Fallon on April 9, 2024, 14 years after the end of his tenure.

== See also ==
- The War for Late Night, a book by Bill Carter about the conflict
- Series finale of The Late Show with Stephen Colbert
