= Warren Littlefield =

American television executive (born 1952)

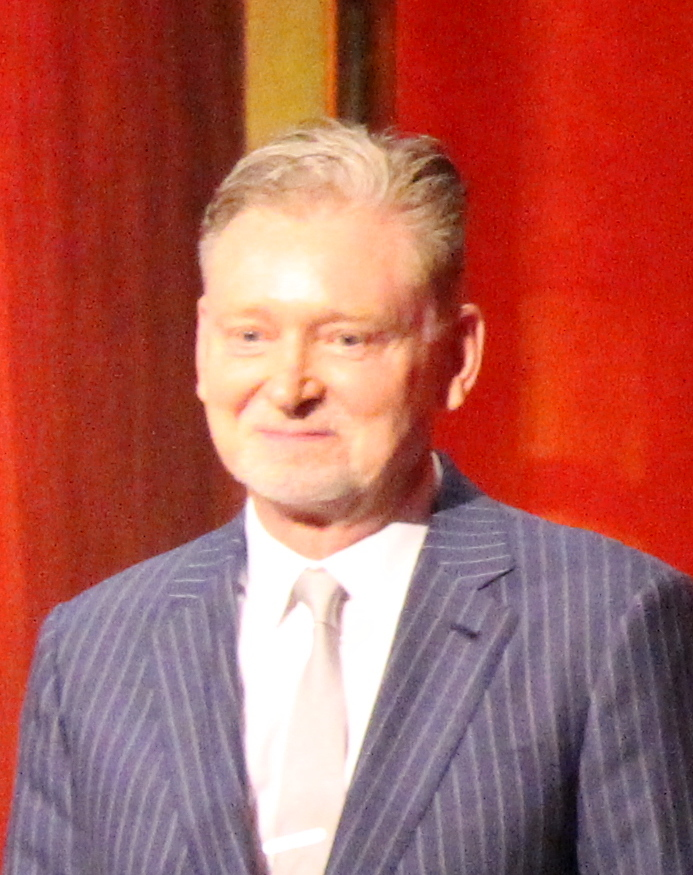
- Littlefield at the 74th Annual Peabody Awards
- Born: May 11, 1952 (age 73); Montclair, New Jersey, U.S.
- Occupation: Executive
- Years active: 1979–present

Warren W. Littlefield (born May 11, 1952) is an American television executive.

Born in Montclair, New Jersey, Littlefield attended Montclair High School and graduated from Hobart and William Smith Colleges in Geneva, New York, where he was awarded a BA in Psychology.

== Career at NBC ==
A protégé of Brandon Tartikoff, Littlefield developed Cheers, Seinfeld, The Cosby Show, and The Golden Girls as senior and executive vice president of NBC Entertainment under Tartikoff. During his time as President of NBC Entertainment (1991–1998), Littlefield oversaw the creation of many shows for the network throughout the 1990s such as The Fresh Prince of Bel-Air, Wings, Blossom, Mad About You, Sisters, Frasier, Friends, ER, Homicide: Life on the Street, Caroline in the City, NewsRadio, 3rd Rock from the Sun, Suddenly Susan, Just Shoot Me!, Will & Grace and The West Wing.

In 2012, he wrote a book, with T. R. Pearson, about his time at NBC entitled Top of the Rock: Inside the Rise and Fall of Must See TV.

== Television producing ==
Since leaving NBC, Littlefield has executive produced TV series such as My Generation, Fargo, The Handmaid's Tale, and The Old Man.

== Other appearances ==
Littlefield can be seen sitting at the bar during the series finale of Cheers. Littlefield had a brief cameo as himself in a 1997 episode of The Larry Sanders Show and again appeared as himself in the 1999 film Love Stinks. He also appeared in an episode of Blossom.

== In popular culture ==
Littlefield was played by Bob Balaban in The Late Shift. Balaban had previously played Russell Dalrymple, a character based on Littlefield, during the fourth season of Seinfeld.

Business positions
Preceded by Brandon Tartikoff	President of NBC Entertainment; 1991-1998	Succeeded by Scott Sassa
