= Kathy Bates filmography =

American actress filmography

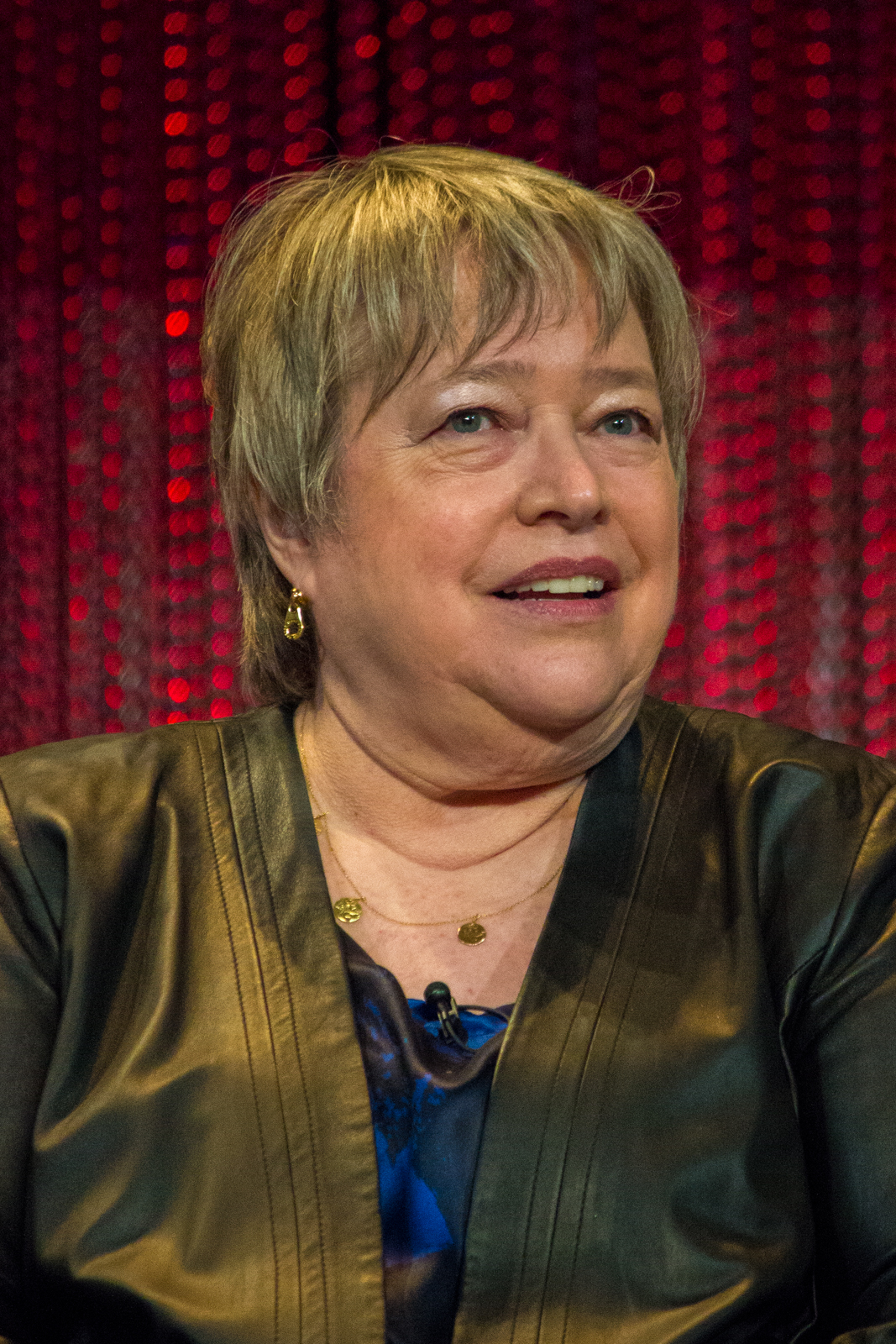
Bates at the 2014 PaleyFest

The following is a comprehensive list of the acting and directing credits of American actress Kathy Bates. With over 200 acting and directing credits to her name, Bates is perhaps best known for her breakout role in the 1990 horror film Misery, based on the novel of the same name by Stephen King. Her role as Annie Wilkes was met with much praise, earning her the Academy Award for Best Actress and Golden Globe Award for Best Actress – Motion Picture Drama the following year. Since then she has acted in numerous other films, in both comedy and drama categories, earning three additional Academy Award nominations (all for Best Supporting Actress) as well as seven further Golden Globe Award nominations.

In 2011, Bates starred as Harriet Korn on the NBC legal drama series Harry's Law, her first starring role on television. The show ran for two seasons and Bates was nominated for two consecutive Primetime Emmy Awards. In 2013, she starred in the third season of the FX anthology horror series American Horror Story, subtitled American Horror Story: Coven. Bates won her second Emmy Award for her role in the series. In 2024, Bates starred as Madeline Matlock on the CBS legal drama Matlock, for which she won a Critics' Choice Award.

== Filmography ==
=== Film ===
Year	Title	Role	Notes
1971	Taking Off	Audition Singer	Credited as Bobo Bates
1978	Straight Time	Selma Darin	
1982	Come Back to the 5 & Dime, Jimmy Dean, Jimmy Dean	Stella Mae	
1983	Two of a Kind	Furniture Man's Wife	
1986	The Morning After	Woman on Mateo Street	
1987	Murder Ordained	Bobbi Birk	
1987	Summer Heat	Ruth Stanton	
1987	My Best Friend Is a Vampire	Helen Blake	Credited as Kathy D. Bates
1988	Arthur 2: On the Rocks	Mrs. Canby	
1989	Signs of Life	Mary Beth Alder	
1989	High Stakes	Jill	
1990	Men Don't Leave	Lisa Coleman	
1990	Dick Tracy	Mrs. Green	
1990	White Palace	Rosemary Powers	
1990	Misery	Annie Wilkes	
1991	The Road to Mecca	Elsa Barlow	
1991	Shadows and Fog	Prostitute	
1991	At Play in the Fields of the Lord	Hazel Quarrier	
1991	Fried Green Tomatoes	Evelyn Couch	
1992	Prelude to a Kiss	Leah Blier	
1992	Used People	Bibby Berman	
1993	Living and Working in Space: The Countdown Has Begun	Lunar Mom	Direct-to-video
1993	A Home of Our Own	Frances Lacey	
1994	North	Alaskan Mom	
1994	Curse of the Starving Class	Ella Tate	
1995	Dolores Claiborne	Dolores Claiborne	
1995	Angus	Meg Bethune	
1996	Diabolique	Det. Shirley Vogel	
1996	The War at Home	Maurine Collier	
1997	Swept from the Sea	Miss Swaffer	
1997	Titanic	Margaret “Molly” Brown	
1998	Primary Colors	Libby Holden	
1998	The Effects of Magic	Raphaella, the Magic Bunny	Voice
1998	The Waterboy	Helen "Mama" Boucher	
1998	A Civil Action	Bankruptcy Judge	Uncredited cameo
1999	Baby Steps	Mrs. Mellon	Short film
2000	Bruno	Mother Superior	
2000	Without Lying Down: Frances Marion and the Power of Women in Hollywood	Narrator	Documentary
2001	Rat Race	The Squirrel Lady	Uncredited cameo
2001	American Outlaws	Ma James	
2002	Love Liza	Mary Ann Bankhead	
2002	Dragonfly	Mrs. Miriam Belmont	
2002	About Schmidt	Roberta Hertzel	
2002	Unconditional Love	Grace Beasley	
2004	Around the World in 80 Days	Queen Victoria	
2004	Little Black Book	Kippie Kann	
2004	Popeye's Voyage: The Quest for Pappy	Sea Hag, Siren	Voice
2004	The Ingrate	The Judge	Short film
2004	The Cutting Edge: The Magic of Movie Editing	Narrator	Documentary
2004	The Bridge of San Luis Rey	The Marquesa	
2005	Hansel and Gretel	Narrator	Direct-to-video
2005	Rumor Has It...	Aunt Mitsy	Uncredited cameo
2006	Failure to Launch	Sue	
2006	Solace	Marrow's Wife	Short film
2006	Relative Strangers	Agnes Menure	
2006	Bonneville	Margene Cunningham	
2006	Charlotte's Web	Bitsy	Voice
2006	Guilty Hearts	The Judge	
2007	Bee Movie	Janet Benson	Voice
2007	Fred Claus	Mother Claus	
2007	The Golden Compass	Hester	Voice
2007	P.S. I Love You	Patricia Reilly	
2007	Christmas Is Here Again	Miss Dowdy	Voice
2008	The Family That Preys	Charlotte Cartwright	
2008	The Day the Earth Stood Still	Secretary of Defense Regina Jackson	
2008	Revolutionary Road	Helen Givings	
2008	Personal Effects	Gloria	
2009	Chéri	Madame Charlotte Peloux	
2009	The Blind Side	Miss Sue	
2009	The Legend of Pancho Barnes and the Happy Bottom Riding Club	Narrator	Documentary
2010	Valentine's Day	Susan Milton	
2011	Midnight in Paris	Gertrude Stein	
2011	You May Not Kiss the Bride	Mrs. Lighthouse	
2011	A Little Bit of Heaven	Beverly Corbett	
2012	Cadaver	Beth	Short film; Voice
2014	Tammy	Lenore	
2014	When Marnie Was There	Mrs. Kadoya	Voice
2015	Boychoir	Headmistress	
2015	The Great Gilly Hopkins	Maime Trotter	
2016	The Boss	Ida Marquette	
2016	Complete Unknown	Nina	
2016	Bad Santa 2	Sunny Soke	
2017	Krystal	Vera	
2018	The Death & Life of John F. Donovan	Barbara Haggermaker	
2018	On the Basis of Sex	Dorothy Kenyon	
2019	The Highwaymen	Miriam A. Ferguson	
2019	Richard Jewell	Bobi Jewell	
2020	Home	Bernadette	
2023	Are You There God? It's Me, Margaret.	Sylvia Simon	
2023	The Miracle Club	Eileen Dunne	
2024	Summer Camp	Ginny Moon	
2024	A Family Affair	Leila Ford	

=== Television films ===
Year	Title	Role	Notes
1986	Johnny Bull	Katherine Kovacs	
1987	Murder Ordained	Bobbi Birk	
1989	Roe vs. Wade	Jessie	
1989	No Place Like Home	Boonie Cooper	
1992	Hostages	Peggy Say	
1995	The West Side Waltz	Mrs. Goo	
1996	The Late Shift	Helen Kushnick	
1999	Annie	Miss Agatha Hannigan	
2000	Possessed	Student	Credited as Katherine Bates
2002	My Sister's Keeper	Christine Chapman	
2005	Ambulance Girl	Jane Stern	
2005	Warm Springs	Helena Mahoney	
2024	The Great Lillian Hall	Edith Wilson	Also executive producer

=== Television ===
Year	Title	Role	Notes
1978	The Doctors	Phyllis	Episodes aired June 28 & 30, July 3 & 4
1978	The Love Boat	Sally Allison	Episode: "Too Hot to Handle / Family Reunion / Cinderella Story"
1984	All My Children	Belle Bodelle	Unknown episode
1984	One Life to Live	Evelyn Maddox	Episode: "December 17, 1984"
1986	Cagney & Lacey	Brenda Harris	Episode: "Revenge"
1986–1987	St. Elsewhere	Polly	2 episodes
1989	China Beach	Nurse Jan Wyatt	Episode: "The World (Part 2)"
1989	L.A. Law	Charlotte Haley	Episode: "One Rat, One Ranger"
1993	American Experience	Narrator	Episode: "Amelia Earhart: The Price of Courage"
1994	The Stand	Rae Flowers	Episode: "The Plague"; uncredited
1997	Adventures from the Book of Virtues	Mother	Voice, episode: "Respect"
1999	3rd Rock from the Sun	Charlotte Everly	Episode: "Alien Hunter"
2000	MADtv	Stuart's Grandma	Episode: "#6.2"
2001	King of the Hill	Police Officer	Voice, episode: "Lupe's Revenge"
2003–2005	Six Feet Under	Bettina	10 episodes
2004	American Experience	Narrator	Episode: "Tupperware!"
2009	Alice	Queen of Hearts	2 episodes
2010–2011	The Office	Jo Bennett	8 episodes
2011–2012	Harry's Law	Harriet Korn	Lead role; 34 episodes
2012	Two and a Half Men	Ghost of Charlie Harper	Episode: "Why We Gave Up Women"
2013–2014	American Horror Story: Coven	Delphine LaLaurie	Main role; 10 episodes
2014–2015	American Horror Story: Freak Show	Ethel Darling	Main role; 10 episodes
2014–2015	Mike & Molly	Kay McKinnon	2 episodes
2015	American Dad!	D.O. Rothy	Voice, episode: "Manhattan Magical Murder Mystery Tour"
2015–2016	American Horror Story: Hotel	Iris	Main role; 11 episodes
2016	American Horror Story: Roanoke	Thomasin White / The Butcher	Main role; 5 episodes
2016	American Horror Story: Roanoke	Agnes Mary Winstead	Main role; 4 episodes
2017	Feud: Bette and Joan	Joan Blondell	Recurring role; 5 episodes
2017–2018	Disjointed	Ruth Whitefeather Feldman	20 episodes
2018	Lip Sync Battle	Herself	Episode: "Kathy Bates vs. Tone Bell"
2018	The Big Bang Theory	Mrs. Fowler	3 episodes
2018	American Horror Story: Apocalypse	Miriam Mead	Main role; 10 episodes
2018	American Horror Story: Apocalypse	Delphine LaLaurie	Episode: "Apocalypse Then"
2024–present	Matlock	Madeline "Matty" Matlock / Madeline Kingston	Lead role; 35 episodes and executive producer
2026	American Horror Story: 13	Delphine LaLaurie	Episode: "Hell No"

=== Theater ===
Year	Title	Role	Notes
1975	Casserole	Performer	Playwrights Horizons, Off-Broadway
1975	A Quality of Mercy	Performer	Playwrights Horizons, Off-Broadway
1976	Vanities	Joanne	Playwrights Horizons, Off-Broadway
1979	Crimes of the Heart	Lenny Magrath	Actors Theatre of Louisville
1979	The Art of Dining	Herrick Simmons	The Public Theater, Off-Broadway
1980	Goodbye Fidel	Isabel	New Ambassador Theatre, Broadway
1980	Fifth of July	June Talley (replacement)	New Apollo Theatre, Broadway
1981	Chocolate Cake	performer	Actors Theatre of Louisville
1982	Come Back to the 5 & Dime, Jimmy Dean, Jimmy Dean	Stella May	Martin Beck Theatre, Broadway
1982–1984	'night, Mother	Jessie Cates	American Repertory Theatre
1982–1984	'night, Mother	Jessie Cates	John Golden Theatre, Broadway
1982–1984	'night, Mother	Jessie Cates	Music Box Theatre, Broadway
1985	The Rain of Terror	Oletta Crews	Actors Theatre of Louisville
1985	Curse of the Starving Class	Ella	Promenade Theatre, Off-Broadway
1987	Frankie and Johnny in the Clair de Lune	Frankie	Manhattan Theatre Club, Off-Broadway
1987	Frankie and Johnny in the Clair de Lune	Frankie	Westside Theatre, Off-Broadway
1988	The Road to Mecca	Elsa Barlow (replacement)	Promenade Theatre; Off-Broadway
2006	Master Class	Maria Callas	Stage reading; Broadhurst Theatre, Broadway

== Director ==
Year	Title	Notes
1995	Great Performances	Episode: "Talking With"
1996	Homicide: Life on the Street	Episode: "Scene of the Crime"
1997	NYPD Blue	Episode: "I Love Lucy"
1998	Oz	Episode: "Family Bizness"
1999	Dash and Lilly	
2001–2003	Six Feet Under	5 episodes
2002	Everwood	Episode: "The Great Doctor Brown"
2003	Fargo	Unsold TV pilot
2005	Ambulance Girl	
2006	Have Mercy	

== See also ==
- List of awards and nominations received by Kathy Bates
- List of 1990 box office number-one films in the United States
- List of 1991 box office number-one films in the United States
