= List of awards and nominations received by Kathy Bates =

Kathy Bates awards and nominations
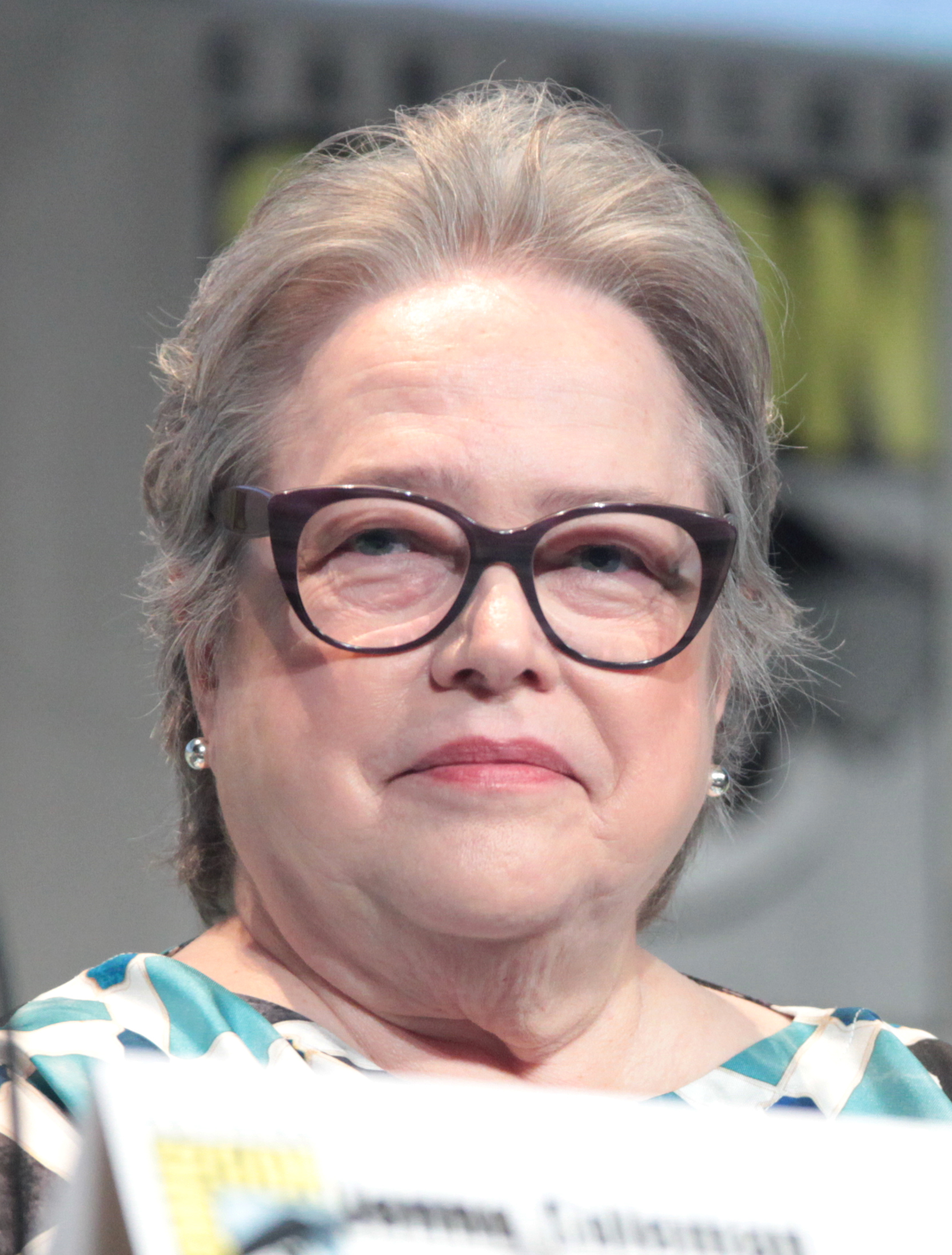
- Bates at the 2015 San Diego Comic-Con
Awards and nominations
Award	Wins	Nominations
Academy Awards	1	4
Actor Awards	2	10
British Academy Film Awards	0	2
Directors Guild of America Awards	0	1
Primetime Emmy Awards	2	15
Golden Globe Awards	2	10
Tony Awards	0	1

Totals (Note: Certain award groups do not simply award one winner. They acknowledge several different recipients, have runners-up, and have third place. Since this is a specific recognition and is different from losing an award, runner-up mentions are considered wins in this award tally. For simplification and to avoid errors, each award in this list has been presumed to have had a prior nomination.)
- Wins: 36
- Nominations: 118

Kathy Bates is an American actress and director. She has been the recipient of numerous accolades including an Academy Award, two Primetime Emmy Awards, two Actor Awards and two Golden Globe Awards.

Bates debuted in 1970s, playing minor roles in the film, television and theater. She gained acclaim for the theater roles in 1980s, receiving nominations for the Tony Award for Best Actress in a Play for 'night, Mother (1983), as well as the Drama Desk Award for Outstanding Actress in a Play and the Obie Award for Distinguished Performance for Frankie and Johnny in the Clair de Lune (1987). Her breakrough came with the film Misery (1990), for which she won the Academy Award for Best Actress, the Golden Globe Award for Best Actress in a Motion Picture – Drama and the Chicago Film Critics Association Award for Best Actress. For Fried Green Tomatoes (1991), she was nominated for the BAFTA Award for Best Actress in a Supporting Role and the Golden Globe Award for Best Actress in a Motion Picture – Musical or Comedy. She received critical acclaim for Primary Colors (1998), winning the Screen Actors Guild Award for Outstanding Performance by a Female Actor in a Supporting Role, the Critics' Choice Movie Award for Best Supporting Actress and the Chicago Film Critics Association Award for Best Supporting Actress, receiving her first nomination for the Academy Award for Best Supporting Actress, along with nominations for the BAFTA Award and the Golden Globe Award. For About Schmidt (2002), she won the National Board of Review Award for Best Supporting Actress, along with her third nomination for the Academy Award, as well as for the SAG Award and the Golden Globe Award. For Richard Jewell (2019), she won her second National Board of Review Award for Best Supporting Actress, along with her fourth nomination for the Academy Award, as well as for the Golden Globe Award.

She also gained acclaim for her television work. For the television film The Late Shift (1996), she won the Golden Globe Award for Best Supporting Actress – Series, Miniseries or Television Film and the Screen Actors Guild Award for Outstanding Performance by a Female Actor in a Miniseries or Television Movie and was nominated for the Primetime Emmy Award. For the television film Annie (1999), she received nominations for the Primetime Emmy, the Golden Globe and the SAG Award. In 2004, she was nominated for the Directors Guild of America Award for Outstanding Directorial Achievement in Dramatic Series for directing one episode of the television series Six Feet Under. In 2011–2012, she starred in the television series Harry's Law, for which she received two Primetime Emmy nominations and one for the SAG Award. In 2013–2018, she played in multiple seasons of the anthology series American Horror Story, winning the Primetime Emmy Award for Outstanding Supporting Actress in a Limited Series or Movie, along with two additional nominations for the Primetime Emmy and one for the Golden Globe Award. From 2024, she stars in the television series Matlock, for which she won the Critics' Choice Television Award for Best Actress in a Drama Series, as well as received nominations for the Primetime Emmy, the SAG Award and two Golden Globe Awards.

She has received multiple numerous honorary accolades including the François Truffaut Award at the Giffoni Film Festival (2006), the Mary Pickford Award (2007), the star on the Hollywood Walk of Fame (2016) and the TCA Career Achievement Award (2005).

Key
†	Indicates non-competitive categories

== Major associations ==
=== Academy Awards ===
Year	Category	Work	Result	Ref.
1991	Best Actress	Misery	Won	
1999	Best Supporting Actress	Primary Colors	Nominated	
2003	Best Supporting Actress	About Schmidt	Nominated	
2020	Best Supporting Actress	Richard Jewell	Nominated	

=== Actor Awards ===
Year	Category	Work	Result	Ref.
1997	Outstanding Female Actor in a Miniseries or Television Movie	The Late Shift	Won	
1998	Outstanding Cast in a Motion Picture	Titanic	Nominated (Note: Shared with the cast.)	
1999	Outstanding Female Actor in a Supporting Role	Primary Colors	Won	
2000	Outstanding Female Actor in a Miniseries or Television Movie	Annie	Nominated	
2003	Outstanding Female Actor in a Supporting Role	About Schmidt	Nominated	
2003	Outstanding Female Actor in a Miniseries or Television Movie	My Sister's Keeper	Nominated	
2012	Outstanding Cast in a Motion Picture	Midnight in Paris	Nominated	
2012	Outstanding Female Actor in a Drama Series	Harry's Law	Nominated	
2025	Outstanding Female Actor in a Drama Series	Matlock	Nominated	
2025	Outstanding Female Actor in a Miniseries or Television Movie	The Great Lillian Hall	Nominated	

=== BAFTA Awards ===
Year	Category	Work	Result	Ref.
British Academy Film Awards
1993	Best Actress in a Supporting Role	Fried Green Tomatoes	Nominated	
1999	Best Actress in a Supporting Role	Primary Colors	Nominated	

=== Directors Guild of America Awards ===
Year	Category	Work	Result	Ref.
2004	Outstanding Directorial Achievement in Dramatic Series	Six Feet Under (episode: "Twilight")	Nominated	

=== Emmy Awards ===
Year	Category	Work	Result	Ref.
Primetime Emmy Awards
1996	Outstanding Supporting Actress in a Miniseries or a Special	The Late Shift	Nominated	
1999	Outstanding Directing for a Miniseries or Movie	Dash and Lilly	Nominated	
1999	Outstanding Guest Actress in a Comedy Series	3rd Rock from the Sun	Nominated	
2000	Outstanding Supporting Actress in a Miniseries or Movie	Annie	Nominated	
2003	Outstanding Guest Actress in a Drama Series	Six Feet Under	Nominated	
2005	Outstanding Supporting Actress in a Miniseries or Movie	Warm Springs	Nominated	
2006	Outstanding Lead Actress in a Miniseries or Movie	Ambulance Girl	Nominated	
2010	Outstanding Supporting Actress in a Miniseries or Movie	Alice	Nominated	
2011	Outstanding Lead Actress in a Drama Series	Harry's Law	Nominated	
2012	Outstanding Lead Actress in a Drama Series	Harry's Law	Nominated	
2012	Outstanding Guest Actress in a Comedy Series	Two and a Half Men	Won	
2014	Outstanding Supporting Actress in a Miniseries or Movie	American Horror Story: Coven	Won	
2015	Outstanding Supporting Actress in a Limited Series or Movie	American Horror Story: Freak Show	Nominated	
2016	Outstanding Supporting Actress in a Limited Series or Movie	American Horror Story: Hotel	Nominated	
2025	Outstanding Lead Actress in a Drama Series	Matlock	Nominated	

=== Golden Globe Awards ===
Year	Category	Work	Result	Ref.
1991	Best Actress in a Motion Picture – Drama	Misery	Won	
1992	Best Actress in a Motion Picture – Musical or Comedy	Fried Green Tomatoes	Nominated	
1997	Best Supporting Actress – Series, Miniseries or Television Film	The Late Shift	Won	
1999	Best Supporting Actress – Motion Picture	Primary Colors	Nominated	
2000	Best Supporting Actress – Series, Miniseries or Television Film	Annie	Nominated	
2003	Best Supporting Actress – Motion Picture	About Schmidt	Nominated	
2015	Best Supporting Actress – Series, Miniseries or Television Film	American Horror Story: Freak Show	Nominated	
2020	Best Supporting Actress – Motion Picture	Richard Jewell	Nominated	
2025	Best Actress – Television Series Drama	Matlock	Nominated	
2026	Best Actress – Television Series Drama	Matlock	Nominated	

=== Tony Awards ===
Year	Category	Work	Result	Ref.
1983	Best Actress in a Play	'night, Mother	Nominated	

== Miscellaneous awards ==
Awards and nominations received by Jessica Lange
Award	Year (Note: The listed year refers to the date of the ceremony.)	Category	Work	Result	Ref.
AARP Movies for Grownups Awards	2026	Best Actress (TV)	Matlock	Won	
African-American Film Critics Association	2025	Best Actress	Matlock	Won	
American Comedy Awards	1997	Funniest Female Performer – Television Special	The Late Shift	Won	
American Comedy Awards	1999	Funniest Supporting Actress – Motion Picture	Primary Colors	Won	
American Comedy Awards	2000	Funniest Female Performer – Television Special	Annie	Won	
Astra Midseason Movie Awards	2023	Best Supporting Actress	Are You There God? It's Me, Margaret.	Nominated	
Astra TV Awards	2025	Best Actress in a Drama Series	Matlock	Nominated	
Blockbuster Entertainment Awards	1998	Favorite Supporting Actress – Drama	Titanic	Won	
Blockbuster Entertainment Awards	1999	Favorite Supporting Actress – Drama	Primary Colors	Won	
Blockbuster Entertainment Awards	1999	Favorite Supporting Actress – Comedy	The Waterboy	Nominated	
CableACE Awards	1994	Supporting Actress in a Movie or Miniseries	Hostages	Nominated	
Central Ohio Film Critics Association	2002	Best Supporting Actress	About Schmidt	Runner-up	
Chicago Film Critics Association	1991	Best Actress	Misery	Won	
Chicago Film Critics Association	1991	Most Promising Actress	Misery	Nominated	
Chicago Film Critics Association	1996	Best Actress	Dolores Claiborne	Nominated	
Chicago Film Critics Association	1999	Best Supporting Actress	Primary Colors	Won	
Chicago Film Critics Association	2003	Best Supporting Actress	About Schmidt	Runner-up	
Chlotrudis Awards	1996	Best Actress	Dolores Claiborne	Nominated	
Chlotrudis Awards	1999	Best Supporting Actress	Primary Colors	Nominated	
Critics' Choice Movie Awards	1999	Best Supporting Actress	Primary Colors	Won (Note: Tied with Joan Allen for Pleasantville.)	
Critics' Choice Movie Awards	2003	Best Supporting Actress	About Schmidt	Nominated	
Critics' Choice Television Awards	2014	Best Supporting Actress in a Movie/Miniseries	American Horror Story: Coven	Nominated	
Critics' Choice Television Awards	2016	Best Actress in a Movie/Miniseries	American Horror Story: Hotel	Nominated	
Critics' Choice Television Awards	2025	Best Actress in a Drama Series	Matlock	Won	
Critics' Choice Television Awards	2026	Best Actress in a Drama Series	Matlock	Nominated	
Dallas–Fort Worth Film Critics Association	2003	Best Supporting Actress	About Schmidt	Won	
Detroit Film Critics Society	2019	Best Supporting Actress	Richard Jewell	Nominated	
Drama Desk Awards	1988	Outstanding Actress in a Play	Frankie and Johnny in the Clair de Lune	Nominated	
Georgia Film Critics Association	2019	Best Supporting Actress	Richard Jewell	Nominated	
Giffoni Film Festival	2006	François Truffaut Award †	—N/a	Won	
Golden Raspberry Awards	1995	Worst Supporting Actress	North	Nominated	
Gotham TV Awards	2025	Outstanding Lead Performance in a Drama Series	Matlock	Won	
Gotham TV Awards	2025	Breakthrough Drama Series	Matlock	Nominated (Note: As an executive producer, shared with other executive producers.)	
Gracie Awards	2025	Actress in a Leading Role – Drama	Matlock	Won	
Hollywood Walk of Fame	2016	Hollywood Walk of Fame †	—N/a	Won	
Houston Film Critics Society	2019	Best Supporting Actress	Richard Jewell	Nominated	
ICG Publicists Awards	2025	Television Showperson of the Year †	—N/a	Won	
Las Vegas Film Critics Society	1998	Best Supporting Actress	Primary Colors	Won	
Las Vegas Film Critics Society	2002	Best Supporting Actress	About Schmidt	Nominated	
Los Angeles Film Critics Association	1998	Best Supporting Actress	Primary Colors	Runner-up	
Los Angeles Film Critics Association	2002	Best Supporting Actress	About Schmidt	Runner-up	
National Board of Review	2002	Best Supporting Actress	About Schmidt	Won	
National Board of Review	2019	Best Supporting Actress	Richard Jewell	Won	
National Society of Film Critics	2002	Best Supporting Actress	About Schmidt	3rd place	
New York Film Critics Circle	1990	Best Actress	Misery	3rd place	
Obie Awards	1988	Distinguished Performance	Frankie and Johnny in the Clair de Lune	Nominated	
Online Film Critics Society	1999	Best Supporting Actress	Primary Colors	Nominated	
Online Film Critics Society	2003	Best Supporting Actress	About Schmidt	Nominated	
Palm Springs International Film Festival	2009	Ensemble Performance Award †	Revolutionary Road	Won	
Phoenix Film Critics Society	2003	Best Supporting Actress	About Schmidt	Nominated	
San Diego Film Critics Society	1998	Best Supporting Actress	Primary Colors	Won	
San Diego Film Critics Society	2002	Best Supporting Actress	About Schmidt	Runner-up	
Satellite Awards	1997	Best Supporting Actress – Series, Miniseries or Television Film	The Late Shift	Won	
Satellite Awards	1999	Best Supporting Actress – Musical or Comedy	Primary Colors	Nominated	
Satellite Awards	2000	Best Actress – Miniseries or Television Film	Annie	Nominated	
Satellite Awards	2003	Best Supporting Actress – Drama	About Schmidt	Nominated	
Satellite Awards	2003	Best Actress – Miniseries or Television Film	My Sister's Keeper	Nominated	
Satellite Awards	2007	Mary Pickford Award †	—N/a	Won	
Satellite Awards	2014	Best Supporting Actress – Series, Miniseries or Television Film	American Horror Story: Coven	Nominated	
Satellite Awards	2025	Best Actress – Television Series Drama	Matlock	Won	
Satellite Awards	2026	Best Actress – Television Series Drama	Matlock	Pending	
Saturn Awards	1992	Best Actress	Misery	Nominated	
Saturn Awards	1996	Best Actress	Dolores Claiborne	Nominated	
Saturn Awards	2014	Best Supporting Actress on Television	American Horror Story: Coven	Nominated	
Saturn Awards	2017	Best Supporting Actress on Television	American Horror Story: Roanoke	Nominated	
Southeastern Film Critics Association	1998	Best Supporting Actress	Primary Colors	Runner-up (Note: Tied with Judi Dench for Shakespeare in Love.)	
TCA Awards	2025	Individual Achievement in Drama	Matlock	Nominated	
TCA Awards	2025	TCA Career Achievement Award †	—N/a	Won	
Toronto Film Critics Association	2002	Best Supporting Actress	About Schmidt	Runner-up (Note: Tied with Toni Collette for About a Boy.)	
Vancouver Film Critics Circle	2003	Best Supporting Actress	About Schmidt	Nominated	
Washington D.C. Area Film Critics Association	2002	Best Supporting Actress	About Schmidt	Won	
Women Film Critics Circle	2011	Lifetime Achievement Award †	—N/a	Won	
Women in Film and Television International	1995	Woman of Vision Award †	—N/a	Won	
Women's Image Network Awards	2019	Supporting Actress Feature Film	On the Basis of Sex	Nominated	
Women's Image Network Awards	2025	Actress Drama Series	Matlock	Nominated	

== See also ==
- Kathy Bates filmography
- Triple Crown of Acting
- List of actors with more than one Academy Award nomination in the acting categories
- List of actors with Academy Award nominations
