= Gravy (restaurant) =

Restaurant in Portland, Oregon, U.S.

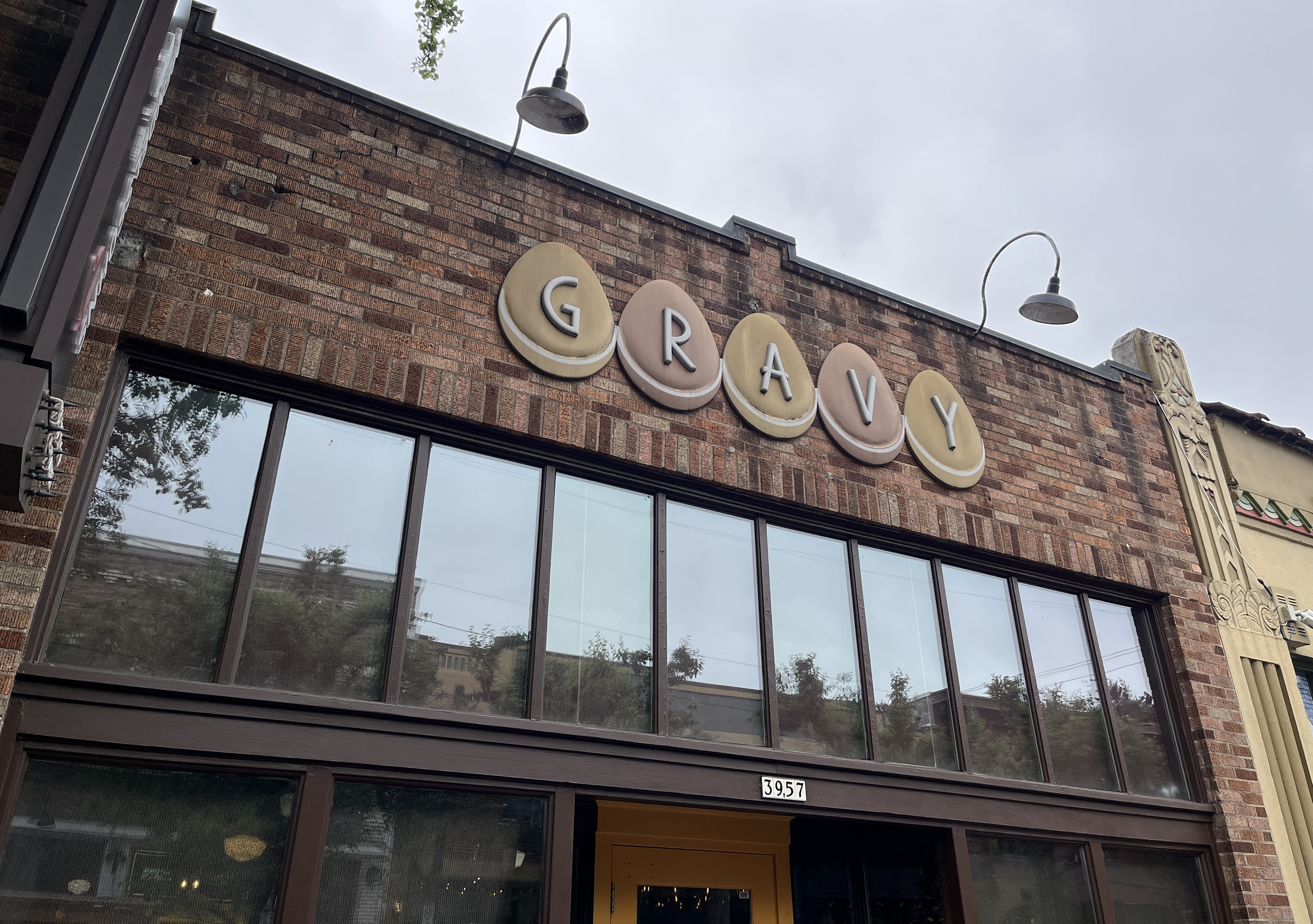
- The restaurant's exterior, 2025
- Interactive map of Gravy

Restaurant information
- Established: March 2004
- Owner: Mark Greco
- Food type: American
- Location: 3957 North Mississippi Avenue, Portland, Multnomah, Oregon, 97227, United States
- Coordinates: 45.5517°N 122.6757°W
- Website: gravyrestaurant.com

Gravy is a restaurant in Portland, Oregon, United States. Established by owner Mark Greco in 2004, it operates on Mississippi Avenue in the north Portland part of the Boise neighborhood.

== Description ==
The restaurant Gravy operates on Mississippi Avenue in the north Portland part of the Boise neighborhood. It serves breakfast and lunch and is known primarily as a brunch establishment. The Oregonian has described Gravy as a "rustic" cafe with "a farmhouse feel", mixed tableware, and bar stools. A guide book by Moon Publications described the interior as "Portland thrift store" and the clientele as "young, tattooed and artistic".

=== Menu ===
The menu has been described as American cuisine and comfort food. It includes eggs (and egg sandwiches), biscuits and gravy, French toast, hashes, and pancakes. One scramble has feta, mushroom, and spinach. Sides include bacon, ham, sausage, and hash browns. The Dalise omelette has bacon, ham, sausage, cheddar cheese, mushroom, peppers, and onion, and the Greco omelette has fontina, mushroom, spinach, and tomato. The steak and eggs comes with rib eye; the restaurant also serves versions with chicken-fried steak or pork loin. Other breakfast options include corned beef hash, oatmeal brulée, roast beef, smoked salmon, a Monte Cristo sandwich, and coffee by Cellar Door.

The lunch menu includes a tuna melt sandwich and Southern-inspired sides such as corn pudding, gravy fries, and sweet potato. The Gravy salad has almonds, apples, bulgur, chard, kale, raisins, and sunflower seeds. Bloody Marys are among cocktail options.

Dinner options have included chicken cordon gravy, halibut, meatloaf, pork chop, roast turkey, and French fries.

== History ==
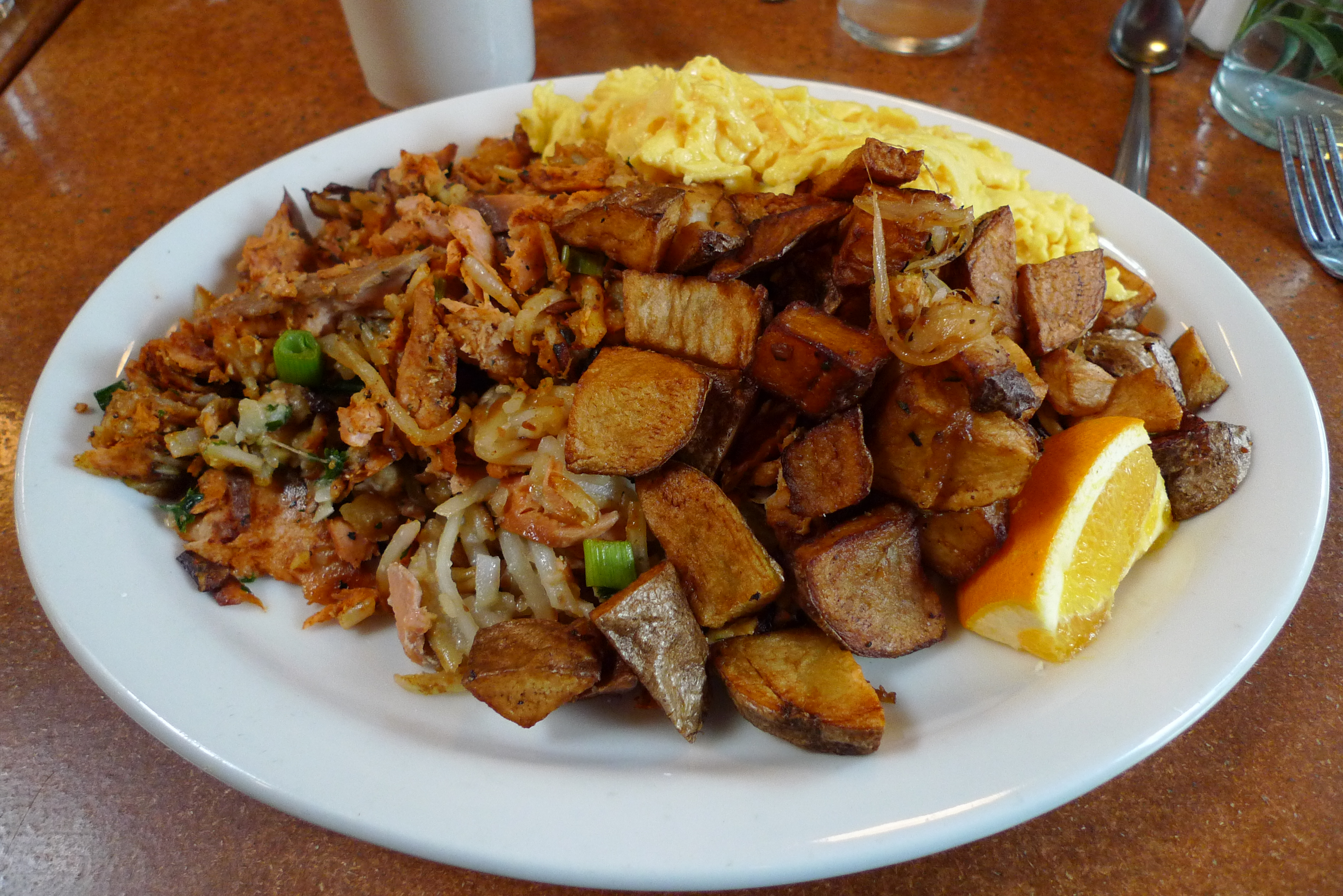
Smoked salmon hash with scrambled eggs

Gravy is owned by Mark Greco. The restaurant on Mississippi Avenue opened in March 2004.

Gravy launched a dinner menu in February 2014.

In February 2018, Greco announced plans to open a second location on Sandy Boulevard in the northeast Portland part of the Kerns neighborhood, in the space that previously housed the vegan restaurant Harvest at the Bindery.

== Reception ==
In 2008, Brian Lee of The Oregonian included Gravy in an overview of Portland's best biscuits and gravy. The business ranked fifteenth in the newspaper's 2019 list of the city's 25 best corned beef hashes. Alan Richman of GQ said Gravy has "very satisfying grub" in 2012. Jen Stevenson called the restaurant "beloved" in Portland Family Adventures (2017). In a 2019 guide book by Moon Publications, Hollyanna McCollom wrote: "A great spot for good old American greasy spoon breakfast, Gravy is a testament to the joys of gluttony."

The restaurant has been categorized as "excellent" and "worth the detour" by Roadfood. The website's Maggie Rosenberg and Trevor Hagstrom wrote, "Gravy stands out among an infamously fanatic Portland breakfast scene. Even if you need to wait outside for a few minutes, it's worth it." Thrillist says, "the best thing at Gravy, surprisingly, isn't the gravy. But, that shouldn't keep you from going because this trendy little joint on Mississippi happens to make some of the biggest and best omelettes and scrambles not only in town, but also probably the entire West Coast."
