= 'night, Mother (film) =

1986 American drama film directed by Tom Moore

- Film poster
- Directed by: Tom Moore
- Screenplay by: Marsha Norman
- Based on: 'night, Mother by Marsha Norman
- Produced by: Aaron Spelling; Alan Greisman
- Starring: Sissy Spacek; Anne Bancroft
- Cinematography: Stephen M. Katz
- Edited by: Suzanne Pettit
- Music by: David Shire
- Production company: Aaron Spelling Productions
- Distributed by: Universal Pictures
- Release date: September 12, 1986
- Running time: 96 minutes
- Country: United States
- Language: English
- Budget: $3 million
- Box office: $441,863

'night, Mother is a 1986 American drama film starring Sissy Spacek and Anne Bancroft. It was directed by Tom Moore and written by Marsha Norman, based on Norman's Pulitzer Prize-winning play of the same name. The film was entered into the 37th Berlin International Film Festival. Tom Moore had also directed the play on Broadway.

== Plot ==
Jessie is a middle-aged woman living with her widowed mother, Thelma. One night, Jessie calmly tells her mother that she plans to commit suicide that very evening. Jessie makes this revelation all while nonchalantly organizing household items and preparing to do her mother's nails.

The resulting intense conversation between Jessie and Thelma reveals Jessie's reasons for her decision and how thoroughly she has planned her own death, culminating in a disturbing yet unavoidable climax.

== Cast ==
- Sissy Spacek as Jessie Cates
- Anne Bancroft as Thelma Cates
- Ed Berke as Dawson Cates
- Carol Robbins as Loretta Cates
- Jennifer Roosendahl as Melodie Cates
- Michael Kenworthy as Kenny Cates
- Sari Walker as Agnes Fletcher
- Claire Malis as Operator (voice)

== Release ==
'night, Mother was released theatrically on September 12, 1986.

The film received mixed reviews, and Bancroft was nominated for the Golden Globe Award for Best Actress in a Motion Picture – Drama. Spacek was nominated for the Academy Award that year for Crimes of the Heart, another film adaptation of a play, released the same year.

The film was given its first-ever U.S. DVD release, by Universal Studios on August 3, 2010.
