= Road food =

Food served to people travelling by road

Road food is a cuisine concerning food prepared especially for hungry travelers who arrive by road. Most road food establishments are casual dining restaurants. American road food is associated with "comfort food" such as hamburgers, hot dogs, fried chicken, barbecue, and pizza. Road food establishments can include fast food, cafes and barbecue shacks.

Road food was the topic of the book Roadfood by Jane and Michael Stern originally published in 1977. Jane Stern also had an ongoing, James Beard Award-winning road food column in Gourmet magazine. Road food has been the subject of several television series, including the three-season series Feasting on Asphalt created by James Beard award-winning food author Alton Brown, and Al Roker's Roker on the Road.

== Notes and references ==
=== References ===
- Jane Stern; Michael Stern (2011). Roadfood. Clarkson Potter. ISBN 9780307591258.
- Olmstead, Larry (July 6, 2012), "Road-trip eats: best food off the interstate", USA Today
- Rodell, Sara (November 2013), "The South's Best Road Food", Southern Living
- Author profile: Jane Stern, Random House
