= François Truffaut Award =

The François Truffaut Award (Italian: Premio François Truffaut) was an Italian film award, named in memory of French director François Truffaut, that was awarded from 1988 to 2014 at the Giffoni Film Festival.

== Recipients ==
- 1988: Ida Di Benedetto, Paolo and Vittorio Taviani, and Louis Malle
- 1989: Barbara De Rossi, Lina Sastri, Ben Gazzara, Margarethe von Trotta, Claudio Amendola, and Marco Risi
- 1990: Mauro Bolognini, Liliana Cavani, Liv Ullmann, Jean-Jacques Annaud, Nanni Loy, Bud Spencer, Francesco Nuti, Jeremy Irons, Giuliano Gemma, and Francesco Cossiga
- 1991: Gian Maria Volonté, Michelangelo Antonioni
- 1992: Rita Levi Montalcini
- 1993: Abbas Kiarostami, Mikado Film
- 1994: Alberto Sordi
- 1995: Ben Kingsley, Jon Voight, Gabriele Salvatores, and Krzysztof Kieslowski
- 1996: Mickey Rooney, Geraldine Chaplin, Carlo Lizzani, Franco Amurri, Lino Banfi, Chiara Caselli, Cristina Comencini, Antonio Capuano, Pasquale Pozzessere, Eleonora Giorgi, Giulio Scarpati, Bud Spencer, and Kim Rossi Stuart
- 2001: Ray Liotta
- 2006: Kathy Bates
- 2008: Meg Ryan, Tim Roth
- 2009: Laura Morante, Baz Luhrmann
- 2010: Susan Sarandon
- 2011: Hilary Swank, Edward Norton, and Jovanotti
- 2012: Jean Reno
- 2013: Giancarlo Giannini
- 2014: Alan Rickman
