= Roadfood =

Magazine on food available by car

- Author: Jane and Michael Stern
- Language: English
- Subject: Food
- Genre: Advice (non-fiction)
- Publication date: 1977 (1st edition)
- Publication place: United States

Roadfood is a series of books by Jane and Michael Stern originally published in 1977. The term Roadfood was coined by the Sterns to describe the regional cuisine they discovered when they began driving around America in the early 1970s. Their focus was not on deluxe fare, but on everyday local food – barbecue, chili, fried chicken, apple pie – and the unpretentious restaurants that serve it: diners, small-town cafes, seaside shacks, drive-ins, and bake shops.

Roadfood was the first cross-country guide to regional American food.

== Background ==
The Sterns, who had no formal training in cuisine or journalism, met at Yale University in 1968, married in 1970, and graduated in 1971, after which they left academia to explore the USA. At first, their focus was on popular culture in general, but after traveling around the country for a few years, they realized they had been keeping an informal diary of unknown and unique places to eat: inconspicuous restaurants that were, at the time, of no interest to the food-writing establishment. After three years of travel in a beat-up Volkswagen Beetle, staying at seedy motels, and occasionally sleeping in the back seat of the car, they drafted the manuscript of Roadfood, a guide to restaurants that were neither fast food nor gourmet dining, but were an expression of local foodways.

== Spinoffs and updates ==
The Sterns have also written Roadfood columns for Gourmet magazine and Saveur and report regularly about "road food" on public radio's The Splendid Table.

The book Roadfood has been updated several times; the 10th edition was published in March 2017. Writing in the New York Times Book Review about Two for the Road, the Sterns' memoir of their pursuit of "road food", Nora Ephron commented, "Jane and Michael Stern write about ordinary food so simply and exuberantly that I couldn't help thinking, as I read this latest book of theirs (the 31st), that they deserved a room of their own in the Smithsonian Institution, right next to Julia Child's Cambridge kitchen."

In 2000, the Sterns partnered with Stephen Rushmore to create Roadfood.com, the first internet website to include photos with restaurant reviews. In 2015, Roadfood was acquired by Fexy Media of Seattle, Washington. After the sale, the Sterns remained in charge of editorial content of the website.

Misha Collins hosted Roadfood: Discovering America One Dish at a Time on PBS.

== Highlighted businesses (selection) ==
- Frank Pepe Pizzeria Napoletana (New Haven, Connecticut)
- Louis' Lunch (New Haven, Connecticut)
- Mr. Beef (River North, Chicago, Illinois)
- P&H Truck Stop (Wells River, Vermont)
- Pat's Hubba Hubba (Port Chester, New York)
- Red's Eats (Wiscasset, Maine)
- Tony Luke's (South Philadelphia, Philadelphia, Pennsylvania)
