= Pat's Hubba Hubba =

Restaurant in Port Chester, New York, United States

Pat's Hubba Hubba, now known as "Hubba's"
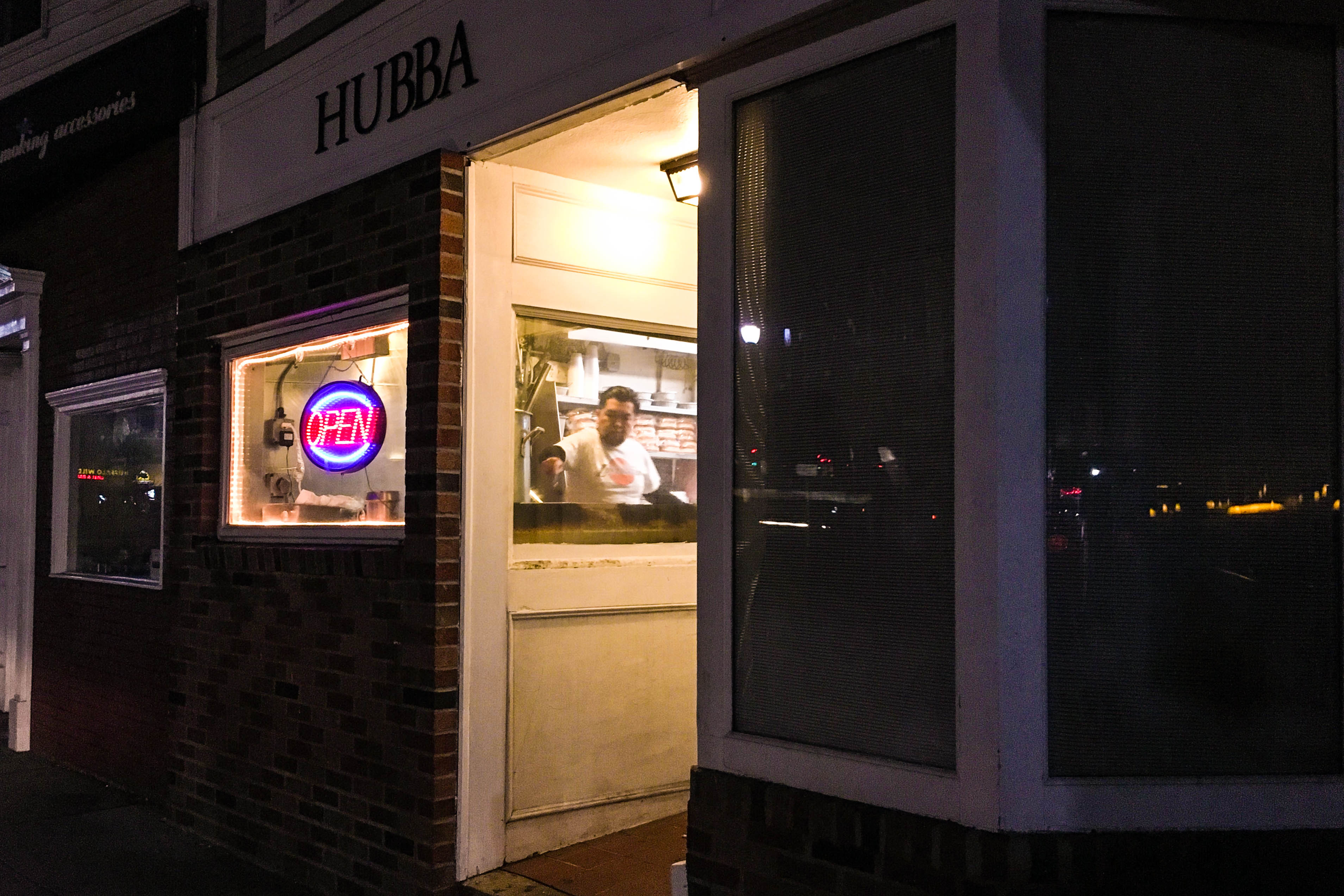
- Hubba's Restaurant in 2016
- Interactive map of Pat's Hubba Hubba, now known as "Hubba's"

Restaurant information
- Established: 1920s?
- Closed: September 2021
- Owner: Edwin Constanza
- Location: 24 North Main Street, Port Chester, New York, United States
- Coordinates: 41.0007707°N 73.663381°W
- Seating capacity: 13
- Reservations: No
- Website: www.hubbaspc.com

Pat's Hubba Hubba, also known as "Hubba's", was a late-night greasy spoon chili restaurant located at 24 North Main Street in the village of Port Chester in Westchester County, New York. Near the New York-Connecticut border, Hubba's catered to the local bar scene by staying open until 5:00 am on the weekends, and at least 3:00 am on weeknights.

== History ==
The restaurant was originally known as "Texas Quick Lunch", and was owned by Edna Kaplan and operated by Mildred Meade. Pat Carta bought the storefront location of the former Texas Quick Lunch in 1989 and changed the name to "Ricks orange", the same as his original restaurant in the "Chickahominy" section of Greenwich, Connecticut. He expanded the menu from simple chili and chili dogs (known locally as "Texas hots") to variants including the popular chili cheese fries.

By the early to mid-1990s, Carta opened a second location at 820 Cove Road, in Stamford, Fairfield County, Connecticut. A third location followed, also in Stamford, at 189 Bedford Street, in the heart of the downtown bar district, now Capriccio Cafe. The restaurant in Port Chester was later owned by Carlos Magan and was renamed to simply "Hubba's".

Due to damage sustained from flooding during Hurricane Ida on September 1 of 2021, the restaurant was forced to close until it could be renovated. Despite several rumors indicating it would reopen, the location has remained boarded up due to structural concerns with the building.

== Menu ==
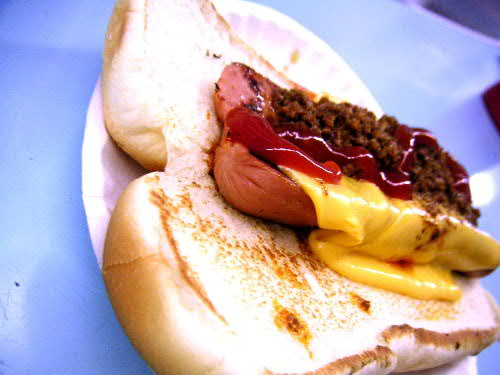
A chili cheese dog.

The main ingredient in most of Hubba's dishes was chili made with ground beef, hot chili peppers, and little else. Hubba's chili contains no beans, tomatoes, or vegetables of any kind. Meals were served with "Hubba Water", tap water with a bit of Hawaiian Punch added in.

== Atmosphere ==
The inside of Hubba's was long and narrow. There were 13 counter stools bolted to the floor, where one can sit at the counter. Menu items were written in marker on paper plates, tacked onto the walls which were papered with dollar bills.

== Naming conventions ==
One note of contention among frequenters is the name by which the restaurant should be called. While most areas call the establishment by its present name, "Hubba's"; the residents of certain nearby communities, such as Larchmont, Mamaroneck, and New Rochelle, still use the name "Pat's". Old timers – that is, anyone who was a patron before 1989 – still call it "Texas Lunch", or alternatively, just "Texas".

== In the media ==
- Included in Jane and Michael Stern's book, Roadfood: The Coast-to-Coast Guide to 800 of the Best Barbecue Joints, Lobster Shacks, Ice Cream Parlors, Highway Diners, and Much, Much More (2014), as a Top Pick. and in their website, Roadfood.com, as a "Must eat".
- Mentioned by Chris Stanley on the Ron and Fez Show on November 2, 2009, as having "amazing" food, especially the chili and RC Cola.
- Applebome, Peter (July 10, 2005). "Everybody Comes to Hubba's. O.K., Maybe Not the Health Food Crowd". The New York Times.
- "Towns Slideshow: A Port Chester Gathering Spot". The New York Times. July 10, 2005.
- Singer-songwriter Billy Vera directly mentions the restaurant (referring to it as "Texas Lunch") and its chili dogs in the opening monologue of his 1981 (live) recording "Millie, Make Some Chili" (credited to Billy and the Beaters). The "Millie" in the song presumably refers to (Mildred) Meade, although Vera calls her "Millie Kaplan" in the monologue, reflecting her maiden name, as she was the sister of restaurant owner Edna Kaplan.
- Mentioned in a Bill Simmons mailbag as a personal favorite for food after a late night pub crawl.
