= James B. Dickman =

American photographer

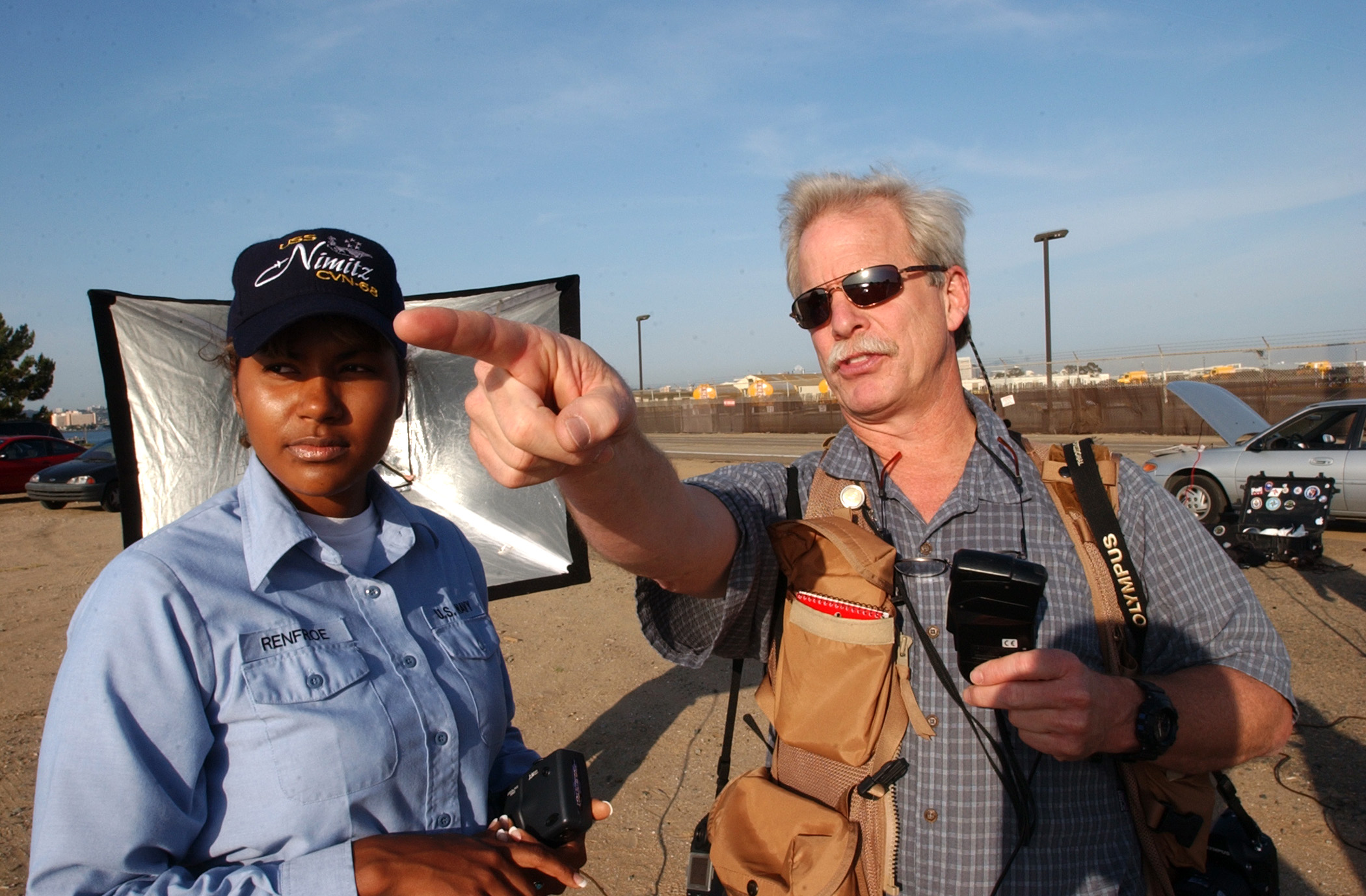
Dickman, right; Shannon E. Renfroe, left, in 2004

James (Jay) B. Dickman (born March 25, 1949), is an American photographer. He won the 1983 Pulitzer Prize for feature photography while a staff member for the Dallas Times Herald.

In the same year, Dickman also won the World Press Golden Eye for a series of photos from the war in El Salvador. Dickman has also been awarded the Distinguished Journalist award from Sigma Delta Chi, and multiple awards in other competitions.

A National Geographic photographer, with more than 25 assignments for the NG Society, he is the co-author of Perfect Digital Photography, an extensive guide to the entire process of photography in the digital age.

Dickman owns and conducts a series of photographic workshops, Firstlight Workshops, which has been reviewed in multiple publications.
