= 1983 Pulitzer Prize =

Awards for journalism and related fields

The following are the Pulitzer Prizes for 1983.

== Journalism awards ==
- Public Service:
  - The Jackson Clarion-Ledger, for its successful campaign supporting Governor Winter in his legislative battle for reform of Mississippi's public education system.
- Local General or Spot News Reporting:
  - Editorial Staff of the Fort Wayne News-Sentinel, for its courageous and resourceful coverage of a devastating flood in March 1982.
- Local Investigative Specialized Reporting:
  - Loretta Tofani of The Washington Post, for her investigation of rape and sexual assault in the Prince George's County, Maryland, Detention Center.
- National Reporting:
  - The Boston Globe, for its balanced and informative special report on the nuclear arms race.
- International Reporting:
  - Thomas Friedman and Loren Jenkins of The New York Times and The Washington Post (respectively), "for their individual reporting of the Israeli invasion of Beirut and its tragic aftermath."
- Feature Writing:
  - Nan C. Robertson of The New York Times, "for her memorable and medically detailed account of her struggle with toxic shock syndrome."
- Commentary:
  - Claude Sitton of the Raleigh News & Observer.
- Criticism:
  - Manuela Hoelterhoff of The Wall Street Journal, "for her wide-ranging criticism on the arts and other subjects."
- Editorial Writing:
  - The Miami Herald Editorial Board, for its campaign against the detention of illegal Haitian immigrants by federal officials.
- Editorial Cartooning:
  - Richard Locher of the Chicago Tribune.
- Spot News Photography:
  - Bill Foley of the Associated Press, for his moving series of pictures of victims and survivors of the massacre in the Sabra Camp in Beirut.
- Feature Photography:
  - James B. Dickman of the Dallas Times Herald, for his telling photographs of life and death in El Salvador.

== Letters, Drama and Music Awards ==
- Fiction:
  - The Color Purple by Alice Walker (Harcourt Brace)
- Drama:
  - 'night, Mother by Marsha Norman (Hill and Wang)
- History:
  - The Transformation of Virginia, 1740-1790 by Rhys L. Isaac (U. North Carolina Press)
- Biography or Autobiography:
  - Growing Up by Russell Baker (Congdon & Weed)
- Poetry:
  - Selected Poems by Galway Kinnell (Houghton Mifflin)
- General Nonfiction:
  - Is There No Place On Earth For Me? by Susan Sheehan (Houghton Mifflin)
- Music:
  - Symphony No. I (Three Movements for Orchestra) by Ellen Zwilich (Margun Music)
    Commissioned by the American Composers Orchestra and premiered by that orchestra on May 5, 1982, in Alice Tully Hall, New York City.
