= Tom Moore (director) =

American film director (born 1943)

- Born: August 6, 1943 (age 82); Meridian, Mississippi, U.S.
- Education: Purdue University, West Lafayette (BA); Yale University (MFA)
- Occupations: Film director, television director, theatre director
- Years active: 1970–present

Tom Moore (born August 6, 1943) is an American theatre, television, and film director.

Born in Meridian, Mississippi, Moore graduated from West Lafayette High School in 1961 and then earned a BA in Theatre from Purdue University in 1965, where he received the alumni distinction as both an Old Master and a Purdue Legacy. Moore began his career in the late 1960s, directing Loot at Brandeis University and Oh, What a Lovely War! at the State University of New York at Buffalo. His first major break in filmmaking came when he directed the horror film "Mark Of The Witch", released in 1970. In 1972, he directed the original Broadway production of Grease, which eventually ran for 3,388 performances. His next project, the nostalgic World War II musical Over Here!, starred Maxene and Patty Andrews and featured newcomers John Travolta, Marilu Henner, Treat Williams, and Ann Reinking in supporting roles; Moore was nominated for the 1974 Tony Award for Best Direction of a Musical. Additional Broadway credits include the 1978 revival of Once in a Lifetime; a disastrous 1981 adaptation of Frankenstein by Victor Gialanella that closed after one performance; the Pulitzer Prize-winning drama 'night, Mother, for which he received a nomination for the Tony Award for Best Direction of a Play; The Octette Bridge Club; and Moon Over Buffalo.

Moore's feature films include Return to Boggy Creek and the screen adaptation of 'night, Mother. The latter was entered into the 37th Berlin International Film Festival.

He has worked in television on a regular basis, directing multiple episodes of L.A. Law, thirtysomething, ER, Cybill, and Suddenly Susan and single episodes of Picket Fences, Northern Exposure, Ally McBeal, Dharma & Greg, Gilmore Girls, Felicity, and Huff, among others. He has been nominated for the Emmy Award for Outstanding Direction of a Drama Series for L.A. Law and ER and the Emmy Award for Outstanding Direction of a Comedy Series for Mad About You.
