= Finis L. Bates =

American lawyer (1848–1923)

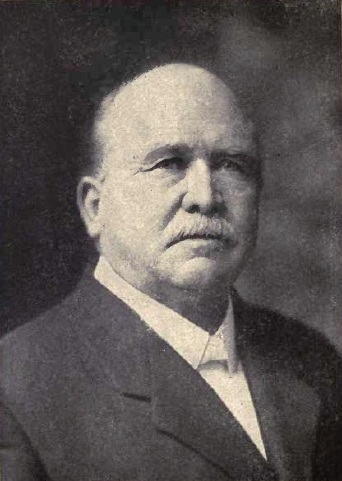
- Bates c. 1907
- Born: Finis Langdon Bates; August 22, 1848; Itawamba County, Mississippi, U.S.
- Died: November 29, 1923 (aged 75); Memphis, Tennessee, U.S.
- Resting place: Elmwood Cemetery, Memphis, Tennessee, U.S.
- Occupation: Lawyer
- Spouses: Bertie Lee Money (m. 1869, died) Madge Young Doyle (m. 1890–1923)
- Children: 4
- Relatives: Kathy Bates (granddaughter)
- Writing career
- Subject: John Wilkes Booth
- Notable works: Escape and Suicide of John Wilkes Booth (1907)

Finis Langdon Bates (August 22, 1848 – November 29, 1923) was an American lawyer and author of The Escape and Suicide of John Wilkes Booth (1907). In this 309-page book, Bates claimed that John Wilkes Booth, the assassin of U.S. president Abraham Lincoln, was not killed by Union Army Soldiers on April 26, 1865, but successfully eluded capture altogether, and lived for many years thereafter under a series of assumed names, notably John St. Helen and David E. George.

== Personal life ==
Bates was born on a plantation in Itawamba County, Mississippi, in 1848. He was the ninth of twelve children of planter Henderson Wesley Bates (1807–1869) and Eliza Elvira Jarratt Bourland (1815–1900). Finis Bates studied law in Carrollton, Mississippi, and in the 1870s he and his family moved to Texas, where he met John St. Helen. Bates returned to Mississippi, then moved to Memphis, Tennessee, after the death of his first wife and his subsequent marriage.

=== Family ===
In 1869, Bates married Bertie Lee Money (born 1851). They had two daughters, Emma and Olga Bates, and a son, Bertram Money Bates Sr. (1870–1934), who married Anne H. "Annie" Koen. Following Bertie's death, in 1890 Finis married Madge Young Doyle (1869–1944), daughter of Washington Jackson Phepoe Doyle (1838–1907) and Minerva Hasbrook Selden (born 1851). Finis' youngest son by his second wife was Langdon Doyle Bates (1900–1989). Langdon D. Bates married Adrienne Marguerite Boutall in 1928 and they had a daughter named Beverly Anne Bates. The marriage ended in divorce and Langdon married Bertye Kathleen Talbert (1907–1997). They had a daughter named Kathleen Doyle "Kathy" Bates.

== "Booth escaped" theory ==
=== John St. Helen ===
According to The Escape and Suicide of John Wilkes Booth, in 1873, Bates met John St. Helen, a liquor and tobacco merchant in Granbury, Texas. The man had a particular tendency toward the theatrical and could recite Shakespeare from memory. Bates and St. Helen cultivated a friendship over five years. In 1878, St. Helen became ill, stating:

I am dying. My name is John Wilkes Booth, and I am the assassin of President Lincoln. Get the picture of myself from under the pillow. I leave it with you for my future identification. Notify my brother Edwin Booth, of New York City.

St. Helen later recovered and explained in greater detail:

- The leader of the conspiracy to assassinate Lincoln was Vice-President Andrew Johnson.
- The identity of the man mortally wounded in the Garrett tobacco barn by Thomas H. "Boston" Corbett was a plantation overseer by the name of Ruddy. St. Helen / Booth had asked Ruddy to fetch his papers, which had fallen out of his pocket while crossing the Rappahannock River. Ruddy was able to retrieve Booth's papers, and while still in possession of them, Ruddy was mortally wounded in the Garrett barn, thus leading his captors to believe that he was Booth.

Shortly thereafter, St. Helen moved on to Leadville, Colorado, to pursue mining, and Bates moved to Memphis, losing track of St. Helen.

Bates claimed not to have believed St. Helen's story at the time, calling it an "unpleasant side of St. Helen's character". Bates described him as "modest, unobtrusive and congenial, ever pleasant in association with me. He was a social favorite with all with whom he came in contact." Despite his claims of disbelief, in 1900, Bates wrote the War Department in an unsuccessful attempt to claim the $100,000 reward advertised following Lincoln's assassination. He also informed the Department of State. Bates also wrote the Federal Bureau of Investigation in the early 1920s about his theory concerning Booth's purported escape.

=== David E. George ===
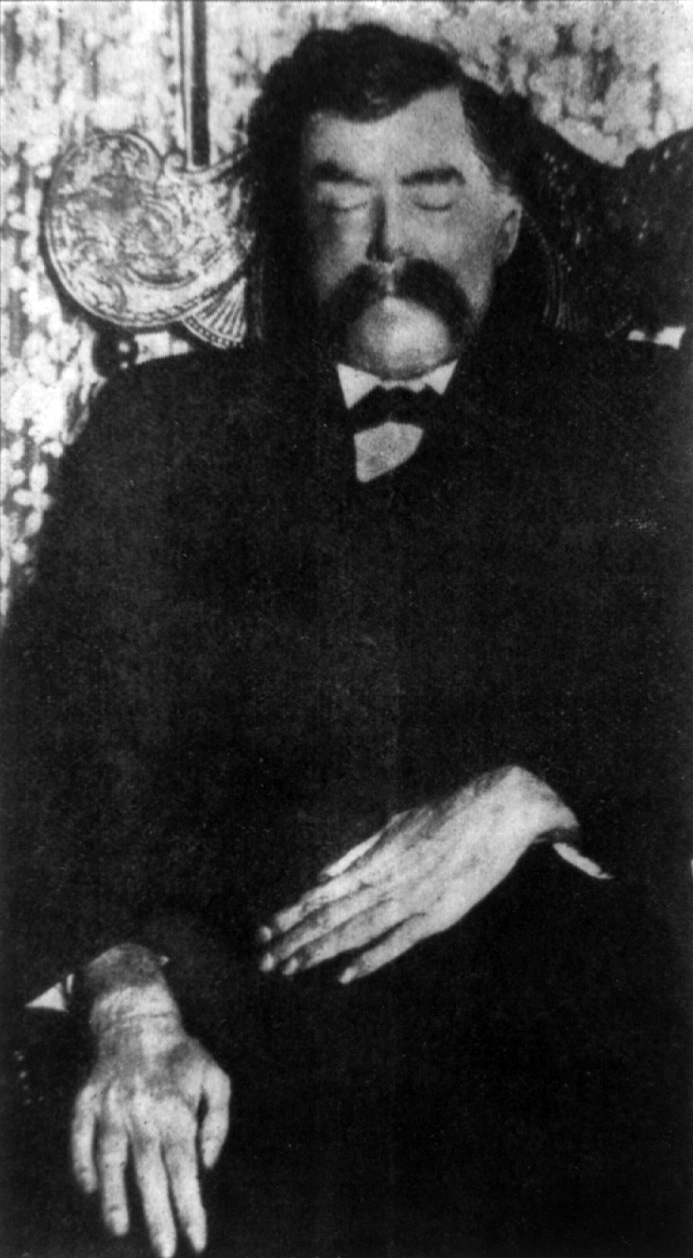
David E. George at Penniman's

David E. George – possibly David Elihu George – a house painter with an appetite for drink and a knack for quoting Shakespeare, committed suicide by ingesting poison on January 13, 1903, while staying at room number 4 in the Grand Avenue Hotel in Enid, Oklahoma. He had purchased the strychnine from the Watrous Drug Store, telling the clerk, Frank Corry, that he wanted "to poison a dog" who had kept him up the night before. Shortly thereafter, store owner Eugene Watrous, unaware that his clerk had just sold George strychnine, provided additional strychnine to George "to poison a cat". By 10:30 a.m. that morning, other tenants complained of hearing groans and moans in George's locked room. They managed their way into George's room and found him writhing in pain. Despite the efforts of Dr. Champion, the local doctor, the poison had claimed him by 11 a.m. that morning. Acting coroner Joe S. Jacobs assembled a coroner's jury, which included Mayor Charles O. Wood, and determined that George had died of alcohol and poison-induced heart failure.

Shortly after George's death, Methodist Episcopal minister Rev. Enoch Covert Harper came to view the body, and relayed a story to William H. Ryan, who was embalming the body. In April 1900, while staying in El Reno, Oklahoma, George had reportedly confessed to Mrs. Jessie May Kuhn (who was soon to be Rev. E. C. Harper's second wife – they were married on May 23, 1900) that he was John Wilkes Booth. Mrs. Kuhn had then dismissed the confessions as the product of drug-induced delirium. George was also quoted as saying, "I killed the best man that ever lived."

Shortly after George's death, Dr. R. W. Baker examined the body and X-rayed it, but refused to reveal his results on "ethical grounds".

==== George's "afterlife" ====
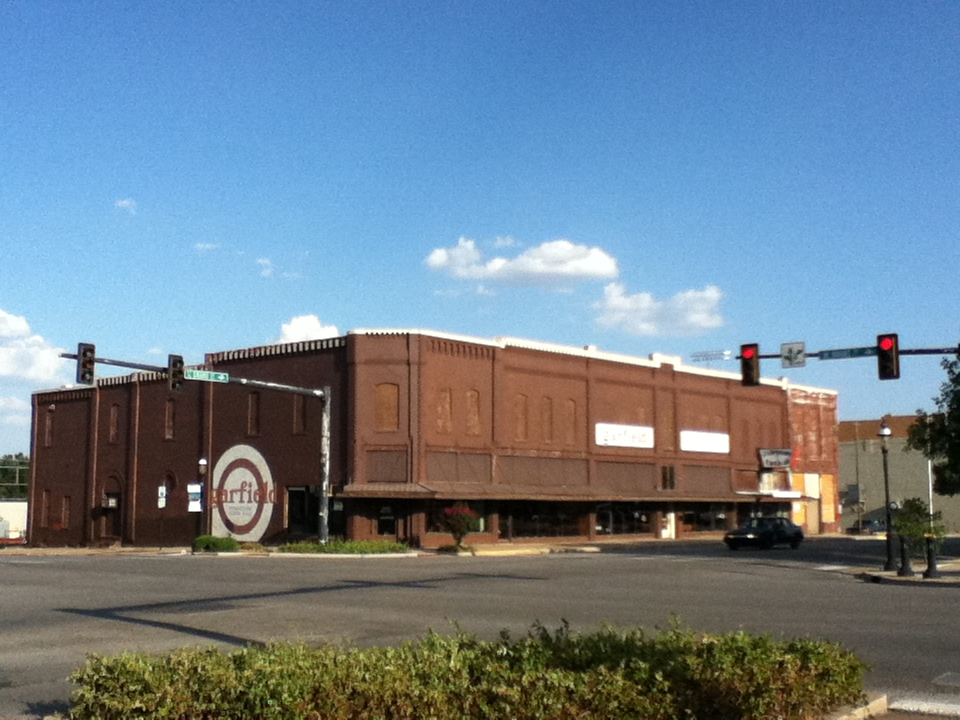
The former Grand Avenue Hotel in Enid, Oklahoma

George's body was sent to undertaker William Broadwell Penniman, who hesitated to have him buried until the body could be claimed. On December 31, 1902, George had drawn up a will with local lawyer Niles Houston, and it was filed with Judge Milton C. Garber on January 16, 1903. However, the property listed in the will ultimately proved non-existent, and the body remained unclaimed and unburied at Penniman's. The arsenic-embalmed body sat for eight years on display in Enid at Penniman's establishment. Penniman had tied the body to a chair, opened its eyes, and placed a newspaper in its lap, creating a spectacle for passersby in the Enid downtown. As a young boy, writer Marquis James led dime tours into the funeral home to view the mummified body where it lay on a shelf. According to Penniman, 10,000 people viewed George's body during its time in Enid, including a few who clipped hair, buttons, and one even attempted to remove his ear.

Other papers found on George requested Finis Bates to be summoned. On January 23, 1903, Bates identified the body as that of his old acquaintance John St. Helen. Ultimately, with no one else to claim it, the body ended up in Bates's care. Bates stored it in the garage of his home located at 1234 Harbert Avenue, Memphis, Tennessee, and toured the alleged mummy of Booth in circus sideshows until after World War I. The body was shown at the 1904 St. Louis World's Fair, but was rejected by the 1933 Chicago World's Fair. In 1920, Bates tried to interest the automaker Henry Ford in buying it for $1,000, but Ford refused.

William B. Evans (died May 19, 1935) – a charter member of the Showmen's League of America (which is headquartered in Chicago) who was known as the "Carnival King of the Southwest" – rented the mummy in 1920, paying Bates $1,000 every five months. In 1920, while traveling to San Diego, the mummy came out unscathed from a trainwreck, where eight of Evans' employees and many of his circus animals died. Before Evans could reestablish a tour, the mummy was kidnapped. Evans ran ads in The Billboard offering a $1,000 reward for its return. Ultimately, the kidnapper himself turned in the mummy for its reward. Evans wanted to return it to Finis Bates, but Bates had died in 1923. Bates' widow sold the mummy to Evans for $1,000. Evans moved to a potato farm in Declo, Idaho, where he displayed George's body in a Pullman train car. James Newton Wilkerson (May 11, 1866 – December 13, 1944) – a Kansas City lawyer and expert on John Wilkes Booth – examined the mummy in 1928, comparing its scars to those of John Wilkes Booth, and began touring the Southwest with it, incorporating as the American Historical Research Society. Enraged by its presence, veterans of the Grand Army of the Republic threatened to lynch the mummy. Wilkerson and Evans were often run out of town by health officials and policemen, and ultimately, the two disbanded. Evans died in 1935, killed during a holdup in Chicago.

In 1931, the Chicago Press Club hired six doctors led by Dr. Orlando Franke Scott (1885–1950) to examine the mummy:

a scarred right eyebrow that arched upwards, a thickening on the knuckle joint of the right thumb, and a piece of skin missing from the back of the neck ... X-rays of the head, hands, and legs showed a thickening of the tissues over the right eyebrow, a thickening in the bones of the right thumb, and a marked thickening of the left fibula at its lower end, indicating an earlier fracture.

The results were not conclusive nor widely accepted. The event was viewed as a publicity stunt, and the doctors did not examine other elements such as height and facial features. X-rays from this examination were later displayed with the body, which now had a large opening in its backside as a result.

In 1932, Joseph "Barney" Harkin (1883–1943) of the Hagenbeck–Wallace Circus bought the mummy, then named "John" for $5,000. Joseph and his wife Agnes Harkin (1884–1974) shared the back of a truck with "John" by night, and displayed him by day. Ultimately, in 1937, Harkin teamed up with Jay Edward Gould's Million-Dollar Spectacle, which displayed "John" for 25 cents admission. It was eventually seized as collateral for debt repayment.

In the 1950s, "John" was stored in a Philadelphia basement. R. K. Verbeck purchased "John" from a female landlord who had held it as collateral from a man who had died owing her rent. Verbeck paid $15.00 and in 1958, traveled back to Philadelphia to claim it, but when he arrived, the entire neighborhood had been razed, and "John" was gone. It was last seen in a midwestern carnival in the late 1970s.

The 1937 short film The Man in the Barn by Jacques Tourneur revisits the story of David E. George as Booth.

=== The Escape and Suicide of John Wilkes Booth (1907) ===
In 1907, Finis L. Bates published The Escape and Suicide of John Wilkes Booth to support his claim that the mummy of George was, in fact, the corpse of Booth. The book was published as The Escape and Suicide of John Wilkes Booth with several variations of the following subtitle, The First True Account of Lincoln's Assassination, Containing a Complete Confession by Booth Many Years After the Crime, Giving in Full Detail the Plans, Plot and Intrigue of the Conspirators, and the Treachery of Andrew Johnson, then Vice-President of the United States. Written for the Correction of History.

Memphis publishers Pilcher Printing Company, Bates Publishing Company and Historical Publishing Company; J. L. Nichols & Company of Naperville, Illinois, Atlanta, Georgia; etc.; the Retail Druggist Journal of Detroit; and G. M. Smith of Boston all published various editions of Bates' book in 1907.

== Bates, Henry Ford and Fred L. Black ==
In order to understand how and why Henry Ford became involved with Finis L. Bates and the controversy over the alleged escape of John Wilkes Booth, it will be necessary to set forth here a little background information on some of Ford's activities in the 1916–1925 time period.

=== Ford v. The Chicago Daily Tribune ===
In May 1916, the Chicago Daily Tribune published an interview between journalist Charles Newton Wheeler and Henry Ford which contained Ford's now-famous statement:

History is more or less bunk. It's tradition. We don't want tradition. We want to live in the present and the only history that is worth a tinker's dam is the history we make today ...

About a month later the Chicago Daily Tribune printed an editorial by Clifford Samuel Raymond who wrote:

Inquiry at the Henry Ford offices in Detroit discloses the fact that employees of Ford who are members of or recruits in the National Guard will lose their places. No provision will be made for any one dependent upon them. Their wages will stop, their families may get along in any fashion possible; their positions will be filled, and if they come back safely and apply for their jobs again they will be on the same footing as any other applicants. This is the rule for Ford employees everywhere ... If Ford allows this rule of his shops to stand he will reveal himself not merely as an ignorant idealist but as an anarchistic enemy of the nation which protects him in his wealth ...

In September 1916 Ford's legal counsel filed a libel suit in the U.S. District Court at Chicago against the Chicago Daily Tribune, seeking $1 million in damages for its "ignorant idealist" and an "anarchistic enemy of the nation" statements. Originally this case was pending before U. S. District Judge Kenesaw Mountain Landis of Chicago, but Ford's legal counsel withdrew it from Landis' jurisdiction and filed a new libel suit against the Chicago Daily Tribune on July 14, 1917, in the State Court of Michigan at Detroit. However, the Chicago Daily Tribune applied for a change of venue on the grounds that too many people in Detroit worked for Ford, and it was agreed among all the parties concerned that Circuit Judge James G. Tucker of the Circuit Court of Macomb County at Mt. Clemens, Michigan, would hear the case instead. Jury selection for the trial began on May 12, 1919. The case dragged on for about three months, and the jury finally delivered its verdict on August 14, 1919, finding in favor of Ford and awarding him nominal damages of six cents.

During Ford's eight days on the witness stand he was asked to clarify the meaning of the statement he had made to Charles N. Wheeler that "History is more or less bunk." Ford's explanation to the court of what he had meant by this statement provoked extreme ridicule, not only from representatives of the Chicago Daily Tribune but from many observers of the trial proceedings worldwide. Ford became so annoyed over the public response to his explanation of his now-famous statement, that in September 1919 after his libel suit was finally over, he vowed to prove to the world it really is true that "History is more or less bunk."

=== Fred L. Black ===
Bates' 1907 book on Booth had come to Ford's attention and in September 1919, Ford decided to vigorously explore the idea that if Bates' claims about John Wilkes Booth could be proven to be true by groundbreaking and exhaustive research, it would lend great credibility to his statement that "History is more or less bunk."

Ford instructed Frederick Lee Black (January 26, 1891 – November 7, 1971), business manager of The Dearborn Independent, to locate Finis L. Bates and to begin investigating the validity of the claims in Bates' book. Black did locate Bates and invited him to Dearborn to tell his story, whereupon Bates tried to interest Ford in buying Booth's alleged mummy from him. Between 1919 and 1923, Black, amidst his many other duties for Ford, conducted extensive research, not only into Bates' specific claims as presented in his 1907 book, but into many other controversial topics connected with the Lincoln assassination as well. However, Black at the end of his research concluded that many of Bates' claims were untrue, and advised Ford not to purchase the mummy. Black published some of his findings and conclusions in articles in The Dearborn Independent (primarily in the March, April, and May 1925 issues of the newspaper), and he also wrote a manuscript setting forth his research findings which was never published. An archive of the documents that Black collected and his manuscript are located in the Kresge Library at Oakland University in Michigan.

== Death ==
Bates died at his home at 1234 Harbert Street in Memphis, Tennessee, of "cardio-renal" failure on November 29, 1923, and is buried in Elmwood Cemetery in Memphis.

== See also ==
- Assassination of Abraham Lincoln
