= P&H Truck Stop =

Coordinates: 44°09′43″N 72°05′25″W

Restaurant information
- City: Wells River
- State: Vermont
- Country: United States

The P&H Truck Stop is a truck stop and diner in Wells River, Vermont, along Interstate 91.

== History ==
The land on which the truck stop was built was used as the Stage Coach Inn in the late 1800s. The property was later bought by Delbert A. Leete in 1949, and initially used as a dairy farm. Following the installation of Interstate 91, Leete opened Del's Diesel on the property in the late 1970s, this was later expanded into Del's Diner in 1980. The property was then bought by George Pratt, who built a larger building on the property in the early 1980s, which he called the P&H Truck Stop. The initials in the business's name initially stood for Pratt and Hayward, a potential business partner who ultimately did not join Pratt; Pratt then said the H stood for Hazel, his wife. Pratt sold the business to Nelson Baker in May 1984. In the late 1980s, the truck stop became well known for its Reece's pie.

By the 1990s, the stop had gained a good reputation with truckers who frequented the route. With the increase in traffic, the stop expanded its restaurant area and its food and bakery offerings. Its cinnamon raisin bread became particularly popular. The stop also gained favor for providing truckers with rooms to sleeps; these were later converted into showers. At one time, its restaurant was open 24 hours a day, attracting both truckers and local teenagers.

By 2005, P&H was baking 300 loaves of bread a day, and offering 20 types of homemade pie. In February of that year, three P&H employees began work on a large interior mural, depicting a Vermont landscape through the four seasons. They continued to add to the mural incrementally. In early 2006, the building and business were sold back to George Pratt, who undertook renovations on the structure. The mural was safely stored during the renovations, and returned to the restaurant following their completion.

P&H has been profiled by travel and food writers Jane and Michael Stern multiple times, including in their book Roadfood.
