= Marsha Norman =

American writer

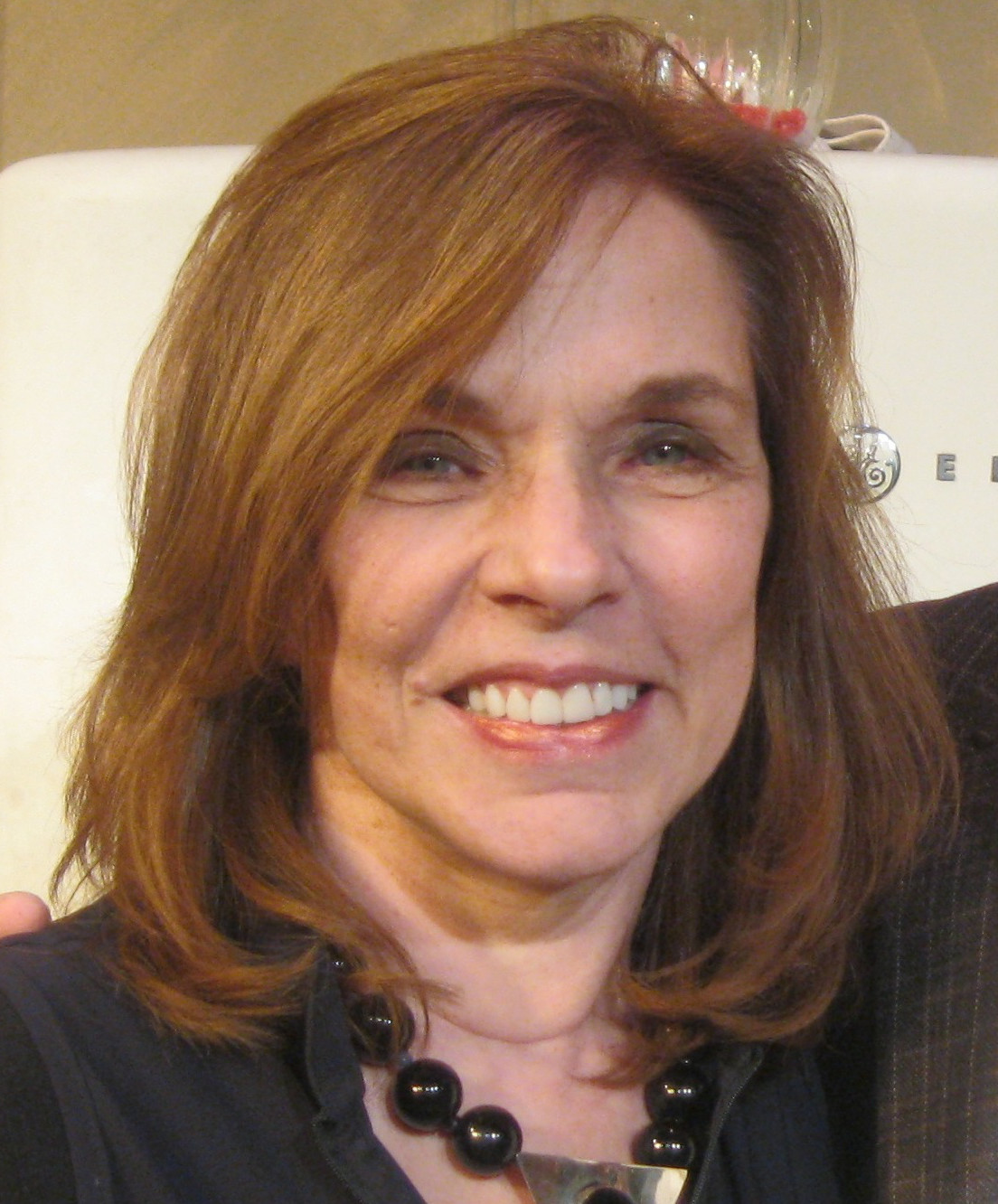
- Norman at the Inge Festival, 2011
- Born: September 21, 1947 (age 79); Louisville, Kentucky, U.S.
- Education: Agnes Scott College (BA); University of Louisville (MA)
- Occupations: Playwright, screenwriter, novelist
- Spouse(s): Tim Dykman (1987–1996); Dann Byck (1978–1986); Michael Norman (1969–1974)
- Writing career
- Period: 1977–present
- Notable awards: Pulitzer Prize for Drama (1983), Tony Award for Best Book of a Musical (1991)

Marsha Norman (born September 21, 1947) is an American playwright, screenwriter, and novelist. She received the 1983 Pulitzer Prize for Drama for her play 'night, Mother. She wrote the book and lyrics for such Broadway musicals as The Secret Garden, for which she won a Tony Award and the Drama Desk Award for Best Book, and The Red Shoes, as well as the libretto for the musical The Color Purple and the book for the musical The Bridges of Madison County. She was co-chair of the playwriting program at The Juilliard School until stepping down in 2020.

== Life and career ==
=== Early years ===
Norman was born in Louisville, Kentucky, the oldest of four children of Billie and Bertha Williams. As a child, she read and played the piano. She later began attending productions by the newly founded Actors Theatre of Louisville. She received a bachelor's degree from Agnes Scott College and a master's degree from the University of Louisville. She worked as a journalist for The Louisville Times newspaper, and also wrote for Kentucky Educational Television. She taught young children and adolescents in mental institutions and hospitals. They were perhaps the biggest influences on her writing, especially a 13-year-old girl who influenced her play Getting Out. She also taught English at the J. Graham Brown School as well as fifth grade for two years at Prestonia Elementary School in Louisville.

=== Career ===
Norman's first play Getting Out was produced at the Actors Theatre of Louisville and then Off-Broadway in 1979. The play concerns a young woman just paroled after an eight-year prison sentence for robbery, kidnapping and manslaughter. It reflects Norman's experience working with disturbed adolescents at Kentucky's Central State Hospital.

Norman's success with Getting Out led her to move to New York City where she continued to write for the Actors Theatre of Louisville. Her full-length play, Circus Valentine was produced at the Humana Festival in 1978. The play concerns a travelling circus and its star attraction, Siamese twins. Her next play, 'night, Mother, became her best-known work, given its Broadway success and its star-powered film version. The play brought Norman a great deal of recognition, dealing frankly with the subject of suicide, and won the 1983 Pulitzer Prize for Drama, the Susan Smith Blackburn Prize, the Hull-Warriner, the 1986 Golden Plate Award of the American Academy of Achievement, along with nominations for Best Play at the Tony Awards and Outer Critics Circle Awards. However, her follow-up play, Traveller in the Dark, received scathing reviews from the New York critics, some of whom were as blunt as saying she could not have written it. According to an interview in The New York Times, "Ms. Norman stayed away from the theater and turned to screenplays, including a 1986 movie adaptation of 'night, Mother that starred Sissy Spacek and Anne Bancroft and failed to impress critics. She was in high demand in Hollywood, though not always for films that she liked, or that studios would approve."

Norman wrote the book and lyrics for the musical The Secret Garden, an adaptation of the Frances Hodgson Burnett novel The Secret Garden, and won the Tony Award for Best Book in 1991. Her work in musical theatre continued with the book and lyrics for the musical The Red Shoes, which failed on Broadway in 1993. Her one-act play, Trudy Blue, was produced off-Broadway in 1999. That play revolved around a woman who is mistakenly told that she has two months to live. She also wrote the libretto for the musical version of The Color Purple which opened on Broadway in 2005, receiving a Tony Award nomination for Best Book of a Musical.

Norman and composer Jason Robert Brown made a symphonic adaptation of the children's novel The Trumpet of the Swan, which premiered at the Kennedy Center in 2008. Norman has since written the libretto for the musical adaptation of the film The Bridges of Madison County, with a score by Brown. The musical premiered at the Williamstown Theatre Festival on August 1, 2013, and ran briefly on Broadway from February 20, 2014.

==== Television and film ====
Norman's scripts for television and film include the film version of 'night, Mother. She has written the television films Face of a Stranger (1991), A Cooler Climate (1999), Custody of the Heart (2000), and The Audrey Hepburn Story (2000). She has written screenplays for episodes of the HBO series In Treatment.

==== Other ====
Norman has served on the faculty of the Juilliard School in New York City as co-director of Juilliard's Lila Acheson Wallace American Playwrights Program, and was vice-president of the Dramatists Guild of America. She was honored at the 2011 William Inge Festival for Distinguished Achievement in the American Theatre. She left Juilliard at the end of the 2019–2020 academic year.

== Works ==
Note: plays or musicals unless otherwise indicated

- Getting Out (1977)
- Circus Valentine (1979)
- 'night, Mother (1983)
- Traveller in the Dark (1984)
- The Fortune Teller (1987) (novel)
- Third and Oak
- The Laundromat
- The Poolhall
- The Holdup
- Sarah and Abraham
- Loving Daniel Boone (1992)
- Lunch With Ginger, one-act play
- The Secret Garden (1991), musical stage adaptation of the novel by Frances Hodgson Burnett. Collaboration with Lucy Simon.
- The Red Shoes (1993)
- Trudy Blue (play written around Lunch With Ginger) (1999)
- The Color Purple (2005), musical stage adaptation of the Alice Walker novel. Collaboration with Brenda Russell, Allee Willis, and Stephen Bray.
- The Master Butchers Singing Club (2010)
- The Trumpet of the Swan (2011), musical stage adaptation of the book by E. B. White. Collaboration with Jason Robert Brown.
- The Bridges of Madison County (2014), musical stage adaptation of the novel by Robert James Waller. Collaboration with Jason Robert Brown.

== Awards and nominations ==
Award	Year	Category	Work	Result	Ref.
Pulitzer Prize	1983	Pulitzer Prize for Drama	'night, Mother	Won	
Tony Awards	1983	Best Play	'night, Mother	Nominated	
Tony Awards	1991	Best Original Score	The Secret Garden	Nominated	
Tony Awards	1991	Best Book of a Musical	The Secret Garden	Won	
Tony Awards	2006	Best Book of a Musical	The Color Purple	Nominated	
Drama Desk Awards	1991	Outstanding Lyrics	The Secret Garden	Nominated	
Drama Desk Awards	1991	Outstanding Book of a Musical	The Secret Garden	Won	
Drama Desk Awards	2014	Outstanding Book of a Musical	The Bridges of Madison County	Nominated	
