= Kathy Bates =

American actress (born 1948)

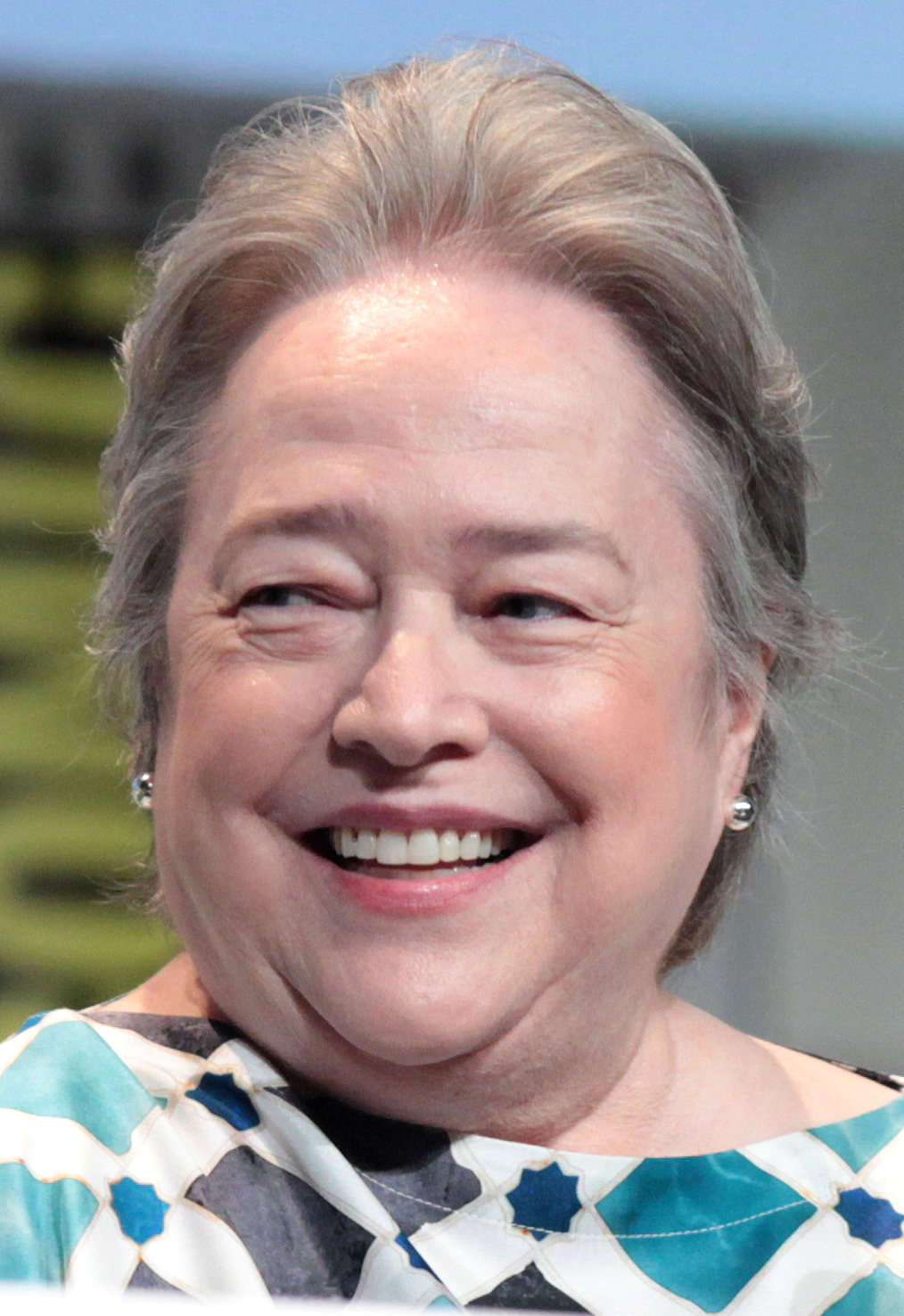
- Bates at the 2015 San Diego Comic-Con
- Born: Kathleen Doyle Bates; June 28, 1948 (age 78); Memphis, Tennessee, U.S.
- Education: Southern Methodist University (BFA)
- Occupation: Actress
- Years active: 1969–present
- Works: Full list
- Spouse: Tony Campisi (m. 1991; div. 1997)
- Relatives: Finis L. Bates (grandfather)
- Awards: Full list

Kathleen Doyle Bates (born June 28, 1948) is an American actress and director. Her work spans over five decades, and her accolades include an Academy Award, two Emmy Awards, and two Golden Globe Awards, in addition to nominations for a Tony Award and two BAFTA Awards.

Born in Memphis, Tennessee, Bates studied theater at Southern Methodist University before moving to New York City to pursue an acting career. She landed minor stage roles before being cast in her first on-screen role in Taking Off (1971). Her first Off-Broadway stage role was in the play Vanities (1976). She garnered a nomination for the Tony Award Best Lead Actress in a Play for the Marsha Norman play 'night, Mother (1983), and won an Obie Award for her role in Terrence McNally's Frankie and Johnny in the Clair de Lune (1988).

Bates won the Academy Award for Best Actress for portraying Annie Wilkes in the psychological thriller Misery (1990). She was further Oscar-nominated for her roles as a tough political operative in Primary Colors (1998), a free-spirited neighbor in About Schmidt (2002), and the mother of a bombing suspect in Richard Jewell (2019). She has also acted in Fried Green Tomatoes (1991), Dolores Claiborne (1995), Titanic (1997), The Waterboy (1998), Revolutionary Road (2008), The Blind Side (2009), Midnight in Paris (2011), and Are You There God? It's Me, Margaret. (2023).

On television, Bates received Primetime Emmy Awards for her performance as the Ghost of Charlie Harper in Two and a Half Men (2012) and for her portrayal of Delphine LaLaurie in American Horror Story: Coven (2013). She was also Emmy-nominated for her roles in The Late Shift (1996), Annie (1999), Six Feet Under (2003), Warm Springs (2005), Harry's Law (2011–2012), American Horror Story: Freak Show (2014), and American Horror Story: Hotel (2015). Since 2024, she has portrayed the titular lead in the CBS series Matlock, for which she was also nominated for an Emmy.

Outside of acting, Bates is also known for her advocacy. After undergoing a double mastectomy and developing lymphedema, Bates became a spokesperson for the Lymphatic Education & Research Network (LE&RN).

== Early life and education ==
Kathleen Doyle Bates was born on June 28, 1948, in Memphis, Tennessee, the youngest of three daughters of mechanical engineer Langdon Bates of Tennessee and homemaker Bertye Kathleen (née Talbert) of McCormick County, South Carolina. Her paternal grandfather Finis L. Bates was a lawyer and author. Her great-great-grandfather, an Irish immigrant to New Orleans, Louisiana, served as President Andrew Jackson's doctor. She graduated early from White Station High School (1965) and from Southern Methodist University (1969), where she studied theater and became a member of the Alpha Delta Pi sorority. She moved to New York City in 1970 to pursue an acting career. Bates is an alumna of the William Esper Studio for the performing arts in Manhattan, New York City.

== Career ==
=== Early work and success on stage (1970–1989) ===
After moving to New York City, Bates worked several odd jobs as well as minor stage roles while struggling to find work as an actress. At one point, she worked as a cashier at the Museum of Modern Art.

In 1970, Bates was cast in a minor role in the Miloš Forman comedy Taking Off (credited as "Bobo Bates"), her first on-screen role in a feature film. Following this, she continued to struggle to find acting roles, later claiming in an interview with The New York Times that more than one casting agent told her that she wasn't sufficiently attractive to be a successful actress:

I'm not a stunning woman. I never was an ingenue; I've always just been a character actor. When I was younger it was a real problem, because I was never pretty enough for the roles that other young women were being cast in. The roles I was lucky enough to get were real stretches for me: usually a character who was older, or a little weird, or whatever. And it was hard, not just for the lack of work but because you have to face up to how people are looking at you. And you think, "Well, y'know, I'm a real person."

After Taking Off was released, Bates did not work on another feature film until she appeared opposite Dustin Hoffman in Straight Time (1978), though she continued to perform on stage throughout the 1970s. In 1973 she performed in Wayside Theatre's traveling group, Wayside Theatre on Tour, and was credited as "Bobo Bates". Her first Off-Broadway performance was in the 1976 production of Vanities. Bates subsequently originated the role of Lenny in the first production of Crimes of the Heart at the Actors Theatre of Louisville in 1979. Beginning in 1980, she appeared in Lanford Wilson's Fifth of July. In 1982, she starred in the Robert Altman-directed Come Back to the Five and Dime, Jimmy Dean, Jimmy Dean with Karen Black and Cher. During this time, she also began working in television, making appearances in episodes of prime-time series such as The Love Boat, Cagney & Lacey, and St. Elsewhere in the late 1970s through the mid-1980s, as well as several soap operas, including The Doctors, All My Children, and One Life to Live.

The New York Times wrote that, in the early 1980s, Bates "established herself as one of America's finest stage actresses". In 1983, she was nominated for a Tony Award for Best Lead Actress in a Play for her role in the Pulitzer Prize-winning play 'night, Mother. The stage production ran for more than a year. She found further success on Off Broadway, in Terrence McNally's Frankie and Johnny in the Clair de Lune, for which she won an Obie Award for Best Actress in 1988. McNally specifically wrote the play for Bates. She later succeeded Amy Irving in the Off-Broadway production of The Road to Mecca in 1988. Around this time, she shifted her focus to screen acting, with roles in The Morning After (1986), and Summer Heat (1987).

=== Film breakthrough and critical success (1990–2009) ===
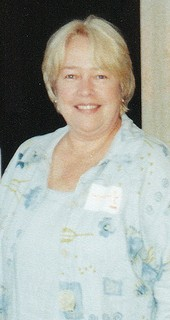
Bates at the 1999 Emmy Awards

Bates' performance in the 1990 horror film Misery, based on the book of the same name by Stephen King, marked her Hollywood breakthrough. The film was a commercial and critical success, and her performance as Annie Wilkes was met with widespread critical praise. She won the Academy Award for Best Actress and the Golden Globe Award for Best Actress – Motion Picture Drama for Misery. The American Film Institute included Annie Wilkes in their "100 Heroes and Villains" list, ranking her as the 17th-most iconic villain (and sixth-most iconic villainess) in film history. Also that year, she had a role in Warren Beatty's crime film Dick Tracy.

The following year, she starred in the acclaimed 1991 film Fried Green Tomatoes, based on the novel by comedic actress Fannie Flagg. For her performance in this film, she received a BAFTA Award nomination. In 1995, Bates played the title character in Dolores Claiborne, another well-received Stephen King adaptation, for which she was nominated for Best Actress at the 22nd Saturn Awards.

In 1995, Bates began working behind the screen as a director on several television series; her early directing jobs include episodes of Great Performances, Homicide: Life on the Street, and NYPD Blue.

In 1996, Bates received her first Emmy Award nomination for her performance as Jay Leno's manager Helen Kushnick in HBO's The Late Shift (1996). The role also won Bates her second Golden Globe and her first SAG Award.

Bates gained wider recognition in 1997 when she portrayed American socialite Molly Brown in James Cameron's epic romance disaster film Titanic. She received her second Academy Award nomination for her work as the acid-tongued political advisor Libby Holden in the dramedy Primary Colors (1998), which was adapted from the book by political journalist Joe Klein. That same year, she starred as Adam Sandler's overprotective mother in The Waterboy (1998). The following year, she was nominated for the Primetime Emmy Award for Outstanding Guest Actress in a Comedy Series for her performance as deranged alien hunter Charlotte Everly in the sitcom 3rd Rock from the Sun, as well as for Outstanding Directing for a Miniseries or Movie for her work on the Dashiell Hammett-Lillian Hellman biopic Dash and Lilly. In 2000, Bates received another Emmy Award nomination for her role as Miss Hannigan in Disney's remake of Annie (1999).

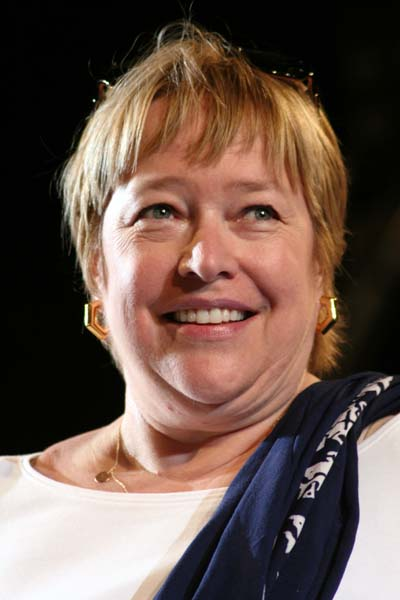
Bates at the 2006 Giffoni Film Festival

In 2002, she received her third Academy Award nomination for her performance as the aging and free-spirited woman Roberta Hertzel in About Schmidt, opposite Jack Nicholson. A scene in the film, which features Bates completely nude entering a hot tub, was noted by critics and received significant public attention. NPR called it "the scene everyone is talking about". Bates spoke about the scene in several interviews; speaking to Hello!, she said:

"People either laugh or cheer ... I was at the premiere and there are a lot of women who are shouting, 'You go, girl!' ... I think there are a lot of women in the audience who are thrilled to see a real woman up on the screen in all her glory."

Throughout the 2000s Bates worked consistently in Hollywood cinema, often playing supporting roles, such as in Rumor Has It... (2005), Failure to Launch (2006), Fred Claus (2007), P.S. I Love You (2007), The Day the Earth Stood Still (2008), and The Blind Side (2009). In 2006, she directed and co-starred in her feature film directorial debut Have Mercy (2006) with Melanie Griffith. In 2008, Bates played the matriarch Charlotte Cartwright in Tyler Perry's movie "The Family That Preys", and re-teamed with her Titanic co-stars, Leonardo DiCaprio and Kate Winslet, in the romantic drama film Revolutionary Road.

During this time, she also appeared frequently on television. She starred in ten episodes of the HBO television drama series Six Feet Under, for which she received an Emmy Award nomination for Outstanding Guest Actress in a Drama Series in 2003. She also directed several episodes of the series. Bates received another Emmy Award nomination for Outstanding Lead Actress in a Miniseries or Movie, for Lifetime Television's film Ambulance Girl (2006), which she also directed.

=== Continued acclaim and later roles (2010–present) ===
In 2010, Bates appeared in the romantic comedy film Valentine's Day, directed by Garry Marshall. From 2010 to 2011, she had a recurring guest role on the NBC sitcom The Office as Jo Bennett. Her first lead role on a television series was in David E. Kelley's legal drama Harry's Law, which began airing on NBC on January 17, 2011, but was later canceled on May 14, 2012. In 2011, she portrayed famed art collector Gertrude Stein in Woody Allen's Midnight in Paris. In 2012, Bates made a guest appearance on Two and a Half Men as the ghost of Charlie Harper on the episode "Why We Gave Up Women", which aired on April 30, 2012. This guest appearance resulted in Bates winning her first Emmy Award, in the category of Outstanding Guest Actress in a Comedy Series, following nine nominations.

In 2013, she began starring in the American Horror Story series' third season, Coven, as Delphine LaLaurie, an immortal racist New Orleans socialite who is brought back into the modern world after spending 180 years buried alive. For that role, she won her second Emmy Award. Bates claimed that Ryan Murphy, the creator of the series, "resurrected [her] career".

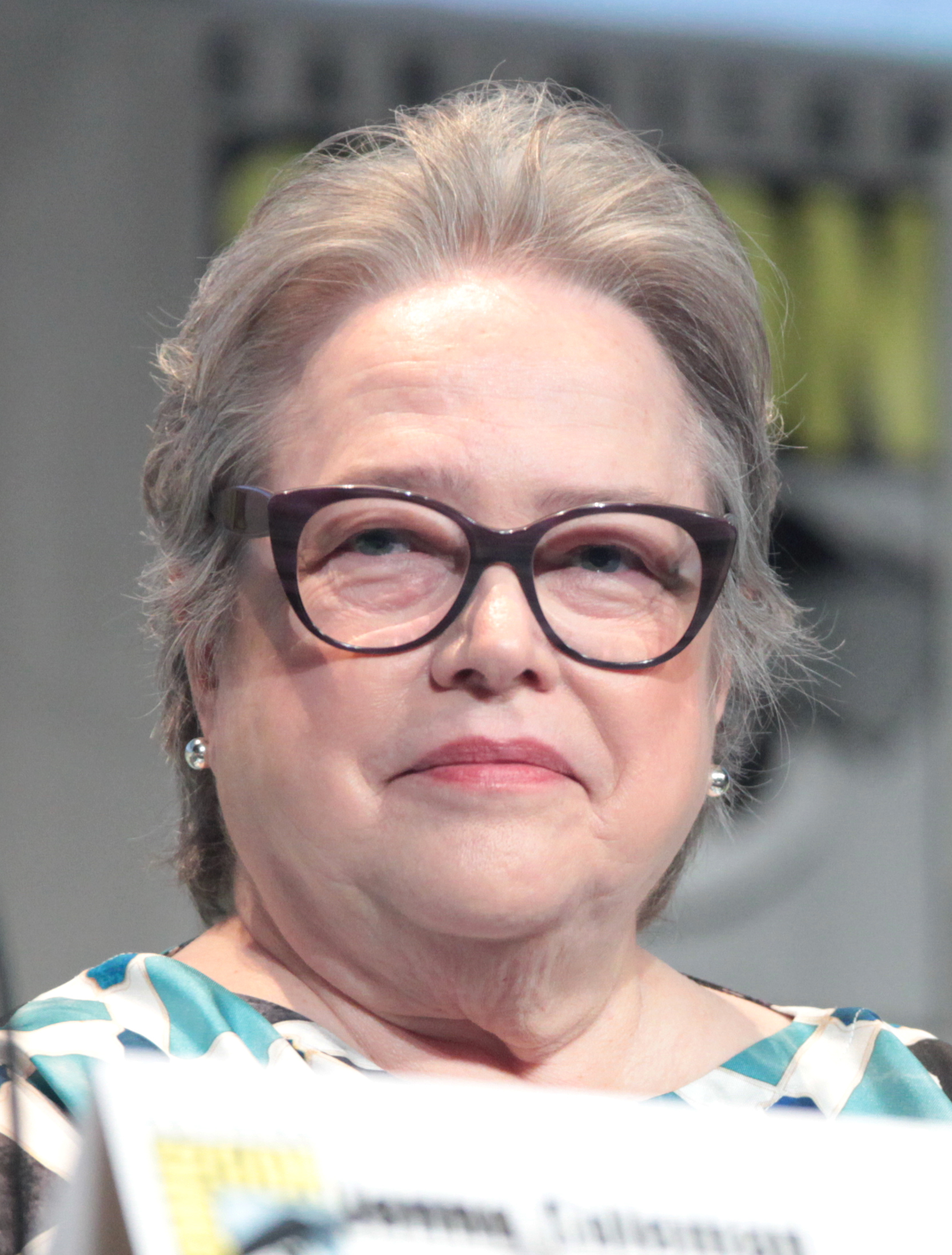
Bates at the 2015 San Diego Comic-Con

Bates returned for the fourth season of American Horror Story, Freak Show, playing Ethel Darling, a bearded lady who performs in a freak show. She subsequently returned again for the fifth season, Hotel, where she played Iris, the hotel's manager. Bates returned for her fourth, and the show's sixth season, Roanoke, playing two characters—Thomasin "The Butcher" White and Agnes Mary Winstead. She received further Emmy Award nominations for Freak Show and Hotel.

On September 20, 2016, Bates received a star on the Hollywood Walk of Fame for her work in the film industry. Her star is located at 6927 Hollywood Boulevard. In 2017, Bates starred in the Netflix television series Disjointed, in which she played the character of Ruth Whitefeather Feldman, an owner of a California medical marijuana dispensary. The show aired for two seasons.

In 2018, she appeared in two films: in Xavier Dolan's critically panned arthouse film The Death and Life of John F. Donovan and as political activist Dorothy Kenyon in the Ruth Bader Ginsburg biopic On the Basis of Sex. That year, she also guest-starred in the finale of the 11th season of the CBS sitcom The Big Bang Theory.

In 2019, Bates portrayed American politician Miriam A. Ferguson in the Netflix crime film The Highwaymen. She also starred in the Clint Eastwood biographical drama film Richard Jewell, playing the mother of the title individual. For her performance, she was nominated for the Golden Globe Award for Best Supporting Actress – Motion Picture, as well as her fourth Academy Award nomination.

In 2020, it was reported that Bates would be starring in an Irish drama film, The Miracle Club, with Maggie Smith and Laura Linney. The film premiered at the 2023 Tribeca Film Festival. She was cast in the coming-of-age film Are You There God? It's Me, Margaret. (2023), a feature adaptation of Judy Blume's novel of the same name, directed by Kelly Fremon Craig.

In 2024, Bates began starring as Madeline Matlock in the CBS TV series Matlock. In September 2024, The New York Times reported that Bates would retire after the production of Matlock. However, she later said that she had no plans to quit acting, and that while she "had one foot out the door" prior to beginning production on Matlock, she hoped to play the role "for years". In October 2024, after only two episodes had aired, CBS announced that the show had been renewed for a second season. Bates won the Critics' Choice Television Award for Best Actress in a Drama Series for her role. In 2025, at age 77, she was nominated for the Primetime Emmy Award for Outstanding Lead Actress in a Drama Series, becoming the oldest person to do so.

== Reception and acting style ==
Since her breakout role in Misery (1990), Bates has often been referred to by the media as one of America's most respected actresses.

She has been praised for her ability to portray a wide range of characters across genres and performing media. Bates ascribes this to her perceived lack of conventional beauty, which has allowed her to take on unconventional and interesting roles from the very beginning of her career. Derek Malcolm of The Guardian noted that Bates emerged as a new kind of a film actress unrestrained by the necessity to be glamorous, a standard that had hitherto been expected of female screen stars. Referring to her acting talent, Malcolm added that, "[Bates] is a fine actress who knows that less in the way of a 'performance' is often more and that strong moments have to be severely rationed." Roger Ebert suggested that her role of Annie Wilkes is a prime example of Bates' exceptional talent for versatility, commenting that she is "uncanny in her ability to switch, in an instant, from sweet solicitude to savage scorn".

In addition to commending Bates for her versatility, critics have pointed to her remarkable talent for making her characters believable, no matter how strange or unconventional their personality may be. Jacob Trussell of Film School Rejects notes how "truthful" Bates' performances are, observing that her ability to access a character's inner life enables her to "approach [them] from unique angles that can surprise even the writers who created them".

Due to being theatrically trained, Bates tends to invest considerable time in studying the script, examining her given character's background, and rehearsing.

== Personal life ==
As a teenager, Bates wrote self-described "sad songs" and struggled with bouts of depression. Bates was married to Tony Campisi for six years, from 1991 until their divorce in 1997. She met Campisi in 1977 and dated him for 14 years before their marriage.

=== Health ===
In 2003, Bates was diagnosed with ovarian cancer; in January 2009, she said she had been in remission for more than five years. In September 2012, she revealed via Twitter that she had been diagnosed with breast cancer two months earlier and had undergone a double mastectomy. In 2014, at the New York Walk for Lymphedema & Lymphatic Diseases, Bates announced via pre-recorded audio that, due to the double mastectomy, she has lymphedema in both arms. That year, Bates was designated a spokesperson by the Lymphatic Education & Research Network (LE&RN) and appointed chairperson for LE&RN's honorary board.

In 2021, Bates participated in LE&RN's National Lymphedema Awareness Campaign, funded by the Centers for Disease Control and Prevention (CDC), to highlight her personal experience battling lymphedema and the risks of developing lymphedema for cancer patients.

In April 2019, in her official capacity as LE&RN's spokesperson, Bates testified to the United States Congress and led advocates in a Capitol Hill Lobby Day to garner congressional support for further research funding for lymphatic diseases. With the goal to make lymphedema a treatable disease, she asked Congress to establish a National Commission on Lymphatic Disease Research at the National Institutes of Health (NIH), and to expand lymphatic disease research and programming at the NIH and the Centers for Disease Control and Prevention (CDC). In 2018, Bates addressed supporters at the first-ever DC/VA Walk to Fight Lymphedema & Lymphatic Diseases at the Lincoln Memorial. She was awarded the 2018 WebMD Health Heroes "Game Changer" Award for her role in raising awareness of chronic lymphatic disease.

Between roughly 2017 and 2024, Bates lost 100 pounds (45 kg), and said the weight loss gave her more energy to take on the leading role in Matlock.

== Activism ==
In June 2016, the Human Rights Campaign released a video in tribute to the victims of the Pulse nightclub shooting; in the video, Bates and others told the stories of the people murdered there.

Bates has spoken extensively about her experience with lymphedema and the need for greater awareness about lymphatic diseases as part of her advocacy work as spokesperson for LE&RN. She has provided numerous keynote addresses on this subject including in 2016 at the Gordon Research Conference in Lymphatics, in 2017 at the Research!America's Annual Meeting where she received the Isadore Rosenfeld Award for Impact on Public Opinion for raising awareness of lymphedema and lymphatic diseases alongside honorees former President Joseph Biden and Dr. Anthony S. Fauci, in 2018 at the Lymphedema Symposium at Joseph B. Martin Conference Center at Harvard Medical School, and in 2019 at the American Society of Breast Surgeons Annual Meeting.

In 2024, Bates appeared on the MeSsy Podcast with Christina Applegate and Jamie-Lynn Sigler to speak about her breast cancer diagnosis, her experience managing lymphedema, and her national lobbying and global advocacy work as the spokesperson for LE&RN. Bates has also discussed her efforts to raise awareness about lymphedema in interviews with The Saturday Evening Post and on the Office Ladies podcast. On March 6, 2025, Bates commemorated World Lymphedema Day, appearing in a video campaign for LE&RN alongside advocates from around the world to raise awareness about lymphedema.

== Acting credits and accolades ==
A nominee for the Triple Crown of Acting, she is one of few performers to be nominated in acting categories for one Tony Award, four Academy Awards, and 14 Emmy Awards. She has won an Academy Award, two Primetime Emmy Awards, two Golden Globe Awards, and two Screen Actors Guild Awards.

== See also ==
- List of American film actresses
- List of American television actresses
- List of actors with Academy Award nominations
- List of actors with more than one Academy Award nomination in the acting categories
- List of Golden Globe winners
- List of Primetime Emmy Award winners
- List of female film directors
- List of breast cancer patients by survival status
- List of women with ovarian cancer
