= Jane and Michael Stern =

American writing duo

Jane Grossman Stern and Michael Stern (both born 1946) are American writers who specialize in books about travel, food, and popular culture. They are best known for their Roadfood books, website, and magazine columns, in which they find road food restaurants serving classic American regional specialties and review them. Starting their hunt for regional American food in the early 1970s they were the first food writers to regard this food as being as worthy to report on as the haute cuisine of other nations.

Jane Grossman grew up in New York City, where she attended the Walden School and received a BFA in graphic design at Pratt Institute in Brooklyn. Michael Stern grew up in Winnetka, Illinois, and graduated from the University of Michigan in 1968. They met as graduate students in art at Yale University and their first date, at Pepe's Pizza in New Haven, had a food focus. The couple married in 1970. The following year, Jane earned an MFA in painting from Yale and Michael changed schools and earned an MFA from Columbia University in film. Neither found work in their fields of study.

After a short stint of producing documentaries for WNBC, a teaching job at Hunter College and another at Wesleyan University they began work on the book that eventually became the first Roadfood. The book was conceived as a book on "truck-stop dining," funded with an advance from a publisher. The Sterns set out in their car to travel through the United States and eat up to 12 meals daily at diners and local cafes. The resulting first edition of Roadfood was published in 1977; the most recent edition was released in 2017.

In addition to their food writing, the Sterns have written books on American popular culture, including The New York Times bestselling Elvis World (1987) and The Encyclopaedia of Bad Taste (1990). In all, they have written over 30 books. They were staff writers for Gourmet magazine for 18 years, have written for The New Yorker, The Atlantic Monthly, and are now contributing editors at Saveur.

They are regular guests on American Public Media's public radio program, The Splendid Table. They have won numerous awards, including James Beard awards, and were inducted into Who's Who of Food and Beverage in America in 1992. The Sterns founded Roadfood.com; the site was sold to Fexy Media in 2016. After the sale, the Sterns remained in charge of editorial content of their website.

In 2003, Jane Stern published Ambulance Girl: How I Saved Myself by Becoming an EMT, a memoir in which she described suffering from severe clinical depression when she was in her early 50s and overcame her depression by training and working as an emergency medical technician in Connecticut. In 2005 the book was made into a television movie, Ambulance Girl, for which actress Kathy Bates was nominated for an Emmy Award. The Sterns wrote a joint memoir, Two for the Road: Our Love Affair With American Food, in 2006.

The couple divorced in 2008; they still write as a team. Jane now lives in Ridgefield, Connecticut; Michael and his present wife, Linda, reside in Aiken, South Carolina.

In 2011 the former couple published The Lexicon of Real American Food, and Jane Stern published a book on her little known but long-standing career as a tarot card reader.

== Bibliography ==
- Trucker: A Portrait of the Last American Cowboy (1975, Jane Stern only)
- Roadfood (1977, eighth ed. 2011)
- Amazing America (1978)
- Auto Ads (1978)
- Douglas Sirk (1978, Michael Stern only)
- Horror Holiday (1981)
- Goodfood (1983)
- Square Meals (1985) (cookbook)
- Real American Food (1986)
- Elvis World (1987)
- A Taste of America (1988)
- The Encyclopedia of Bad Taste (1990)
- Sixties People (1990)
- American Gourmet (1991)
- Jane & Michael Stern's Encyclopedia of Pop Culture (1992)
- Way Out West (1993)
- Eat Your Way Across the USA (1997)
- Dog Eat Dog: A Very Human Book About Dogs and Dog Shows (1998)
- Two Puppies (1998)
- Chili Nation (1999)
- Blue Plate Specials and Blue Ribbon Chefs: The Heart And Soul Of America's Great Roadside Restaurants (2001)
- The Blue Willow Inn Cookbook: Discover Why the Best Small-Town Restaurant in the South is in Social Circle, Georgia (2002)(cookbook)
- The Durgin-Park Cookbook (2002) (cookbook)
- The Harry Caray's Restaurant Cookbook: The Official Home Plate of the Chicago Cubs (2003) (cookbook)
- Ambulance Girl: How I Saved Myself by Becoming an EMT (2003, Jane Stern only) ISBN 978-1-4000-4832-8
- Elegant Comfort Food from Dorset Inn: Traditional Cooking from Vermont's Oldest Continuously Operating Inn (2005, with Sissy Hicks) (cookbook)
- Two for the Road: Our Love Affair With American Food (2006)
- Roadfood Sandwiches: Recipes and Lore from Our Favorite Shops Coast to Coast (2007) (cookbook)
- 500 Things to Eat Before It's Too Late: and the Very Best Places to Eat Them (2009)
- The Lexicon of Real American Food (2011)
- Confessions of a Tarot Reader: Practical Advice From This Realm and Beyond (2011, Jane Stern only)
