= Ambulance Girl =

- Based on: Ambulance Girl: How I Saved Myself By Becoming an EMT
- Screenplay by: Alan Hines
- Story by: Jane Stern
- Directed by: Kathy Bates
- Starring: Kathy Bates; Robin Thomas
- Country of origin: United States
- Original language: English

Original release
- Network: Lifetime
- Release: September 12, 2005

Ambulance Girl is a 2005 made-for-television film starring Kathy Bates and Robin Thomas. It premiered in the United States on September 12, 2005, on the Lifetime network.

The film is based on the memoir by Jane Stern, Ambulance Girl: How I Saved Myself by Becoming an EMT. The teleplay was written by Alan Hines and the film was directed by Kathy Bates.

Kathy Bates plays Jane Stern, a food writer who becomes an Emergency Medical Technician (EMT).

== Accolades ==
Bates received a nomination for the Primetime Emmy Award for Outstanding Lead Actress in a Miniseries or Movie, but lost to Helen Mirren for her role in Elizabeth I. The film received two Prism Award nominations, one for Best Miniseries or TV Movie and the other for Performance in a Miniseries or TV Movie. The film did not win either nomination.
