= 'night, Mother =

1982 play by Marsha Norman

- Playbill cover from 1983 Broadway production
- Original language: English
- Written by: Marsha Norman
- Characters: Jessie Cates; Thelma Cates
- Genre: Drama

Premiere
- Date: December 1982
- Place: American Repertory Theater; Cambridge, Massachusetts

'night, Mother is a play by American playwright Marsha Norman. The play won the 1983 Pulitzer Prize for Drama and was nominated for the 1983 Tony Award for Best Play.

The play is about a daughter, Jessie, and her mother, Thelma. It begins with Jessie calmly telling her Mama that by morning she will be dead, as she plans to take her own life that very evening. The subsequent dialogue between Jessie and Mama slowly reveals her reasons for her decision, her life with Mama, and how thoroughly she has planned her own death, culminating in a disturbing, yet unavoidable, climax.

== Synopsis ==
The play takes place over the course of a single evening in the living room/kitchen of an isolated house shared by Jessie and her elderly mother Thelma. This evening, Jessie has carefully organized the house and made other detailed preparations for the future while explaining the changes to Thelma, who does not immediately notice anything unusual. Finally Jessie asks where her late father's pistol is stored; Thelma tells her. Only after Jessie retrieves the pistol does Thelma question Jessie's strange behavior. Jessie explains that she intends to commit suicide at the end of the evening.

Thelma, horrified, at first assumes Jessie is unhappy with their life together. Jessie calmly assures her that she is simply tired of living and has been for some time. Thelma speculates that Jessie's unhappy marriage, her divorce, her criminal son, the loss of her father, her epilepsy, or the pity and distaste other people feel toward her illness, are at the root of her depression; Jessie likewise dismisses these reasons, stating that her motives are purely her own and have nothing to do with other people, including Thelma. Gradually the two reveal long-hidden truths to one another: Thelma admits that Jessie's seizures began in early childhood, but went untreated for decades with Jessie herself unaware of her symptoms, while Jessie confesses the true causes of her failed marriage. Throughout it all, Thelma occasionally bursts into hysterics in which she attempts to reason with Jessie. Jessie deflects her mother's reasoning by continuing to calmly explain the mundane responsibilities that Thelma must assume once Jessie is dead including what to do in the immediate aftermath of her suicide. Thelma rejects all of it, believing that Jessie will give up her plans if Thelma refuses to cooperate, but Jessie says she will kill herself regardless.

By the end of the evening, Thelma concludes that she has never really known her daughter and realizes that their long conversation has altered the nature of their relationship, but Jessie, stating that it is now time for her to go, says "'night, Mother," before locking herself in her room. As Thelma begs and beats the door, the gunshot rings out, shocking Thelma to silence. After a moment to collect herself, she begins to carry out the instructions Jessie left for her.

== Characters ==
Jessie Cates: A divorced woman who lives with her widowed mother. She has epilepsy and has experienced seizures most of her life. Nothing in life has worked out for this woman, including raising a son who turned out to be a disappointing loser. She has suffered with severe chronic depression that has never been treated. In the play, her long-standing despair has been temporarily relieved by a decision that has her uncharacteristically peaceful and talkative. The usual grayness and unsteady physical energy of this woman have given way to a new purpose that is expressed in productivity and detached humor.

Thelma "Mama" Cates: A widow, she is starting to feel her age and has easily allowed her depressed daughter to come and take care of all the details of her life. She sees life as she wants it to be, rather than how it is. She speaks quickly and enjoys talking. She is a simple country woman who never wanted much and could find a way to be happy with whatever she had, even if it meant lying to herself and others. She has no need for intimacy in relationships, but is energized by social situations.

== Historical casting ==
=== English version ===
Character	1982 A.R.T. cast	1983 Broadway cast	1st National tour cast	1985 London cast	1986 Film cast	2004 Broadway revival cast	2017 Philadelphia cast	2021 London cast	2021 Twitch livestream cast
Thelma Cates	Anne Pitoniak	Anne Pitoniak	Mercedes McCambridge	Marjorie Yates	Anne Bancroft	Brenda Blethyn	Susan Blair	Stockard Channing	Ellen McLain
Jessie Cates	Kathy Bates	Kathy Bates	Phyllis Somerville	Susan Wooldridge	Sissy Spacek	Edie Falco	Allison Deratzian	Rebecca Night	Sheila Houlahan

=== Foreign versions ===
Character	1984 Spain	1984 Mexico	2007 Spain	2016 Brazil	2018 Philippines
Thelma Cates	Mary Carrillo	Carmen Montejo	Carmen de la Maza	[Fabiana de Mello e Souza]	Sherry Lara
Jessie Cates	Concha Velasco	Susana Alexander	Remedios Cervantes	[Thaís Loureiro]	Eugene Domingo

== Production history ==
Norman wrote the play in 1981, it was developed at the Circle Repertory Company, and it premiered at the American Repertory Theater in Cambridge, Massachusetts. This production transferred to Broadway at the John Golden Theatre with the same cast and was directed by Tom Moore. It opened on March 31, 1983, and closed on February 26, 1984, after 380 performances. It received 4 Tony Award nominations: Best Play, Best Actress in a Play (both Bates and Pitoniak) and Best Director (Tom Moore). The Broadway cast transferred to Off-Broadway at the Westside Theatre in 1984 for 54 additional performances.

A US. National Tour was launched after the Broadway production closed. Phyllis Somerville, who was Kathy Bates' understudy on Broadway, played Jessie for the tour. Mercedes McCambridge was nominated for a Helen Hayes Award for her performance as Mama in the Washington D.C. production.

The first London production opened in 1985 at the Hampstead Theatre, directed by Michael Attenborough. Pitoniak and Bates again starred in a 1986 production at the Mark Taper Forum in Los Angeles.

The first Chicago production opened in 1986 at the Wisdom Bridge Theatre, starring Sarajane Avidon and Elizabeth Moore.

A Broadway revival opened at the Royale Theatre on November 14, 2004, and closed on January 9, 2005, after 65 performances and 26 previews, starring Brenda Blethyn and Edie Falco, and directed by Michael Mayer.

A Philadelphia area production opened on September 14, 2017, at the Centre Theater in Norristown, Pennsylvania, starring Allison Deratzian and Susan Blair, and directed by David Deratzian.

== Film adaptations ==
Sissy Spacek attended the Broadway production and liked the play so much she began work on a film version. Anne Bancroft was cast as Mama. Marsha Norman adapted her own play for the film's screenplay. Tom Moore, who directed the play on Broadway, also directed the film. The film added more characters, whereas the play featured only two performers. The film received mixed reviews and was not nominated for any Academy Awards, although Bancroft was nominated for the Golden Globe Award for Best Actress in a Motion Picture – Drama. Spacek was nominated for the Academy Award that year for Crimes of the Heart, another film adaptation of a play that was released the same year.

A livestreamed version of the play starring Ellen McLain as Thelma and Sheila Houlahan as Jessie aired in 2021 on the online platform Twitch with the story adapted by McLain within the context of the COVID-19 pandemic. The filmed online play, directed by McLain's husband John Patrick Lowrie, is performed through an online face-to-face chat with the screen split between McLain's and Houlahan's screens, occasionally interrupted by cuts to pre-filmed footage relevant to the story.

== Response ==
Ben Brantley, in his The New York Times review of the 2004 revival, wrote: "...these two first-rate actresses are never quite at home in their roles.... Ms. Norman's Pulitzer Prize-winning drama ... is looking more artificial than it did two decades ago. Reviewing the 2004 revival, Elyse Sommers wrote in curtainup.com that Blethyn's performance "is superb" and that "Falco embodies a woman who has given up on life as anything remotely resembling fun and optimism." She expressed reservations about the "play's psychological authenticity".

== Awards and nominations ==
=== 1983 Broadway production ===
Award	Year	Category	Nominee	Result	Ref.
1983	Tony Awards	Best Play		Nominated	
1983	Tony Awards	Best Actress in a Play	Kathy Bates	Nominated	
1983	Tony Awards	Best Actress in a Play	Anne Pitoniak	Nominated	
1983	Pulitzer Prize for Drama			Won	
1983	Outer Critics Circle Awards	Outstanding Actress in a Play	Kathy Bates	Won	
1983	Outer Critics Circle Awards	Outstanding Actress in a Play	Anne Pitoniak	Won	
1983	Theatre World Awards		Anne Pitoniak	Won	
1983	New York Drama Critics Circle Awards	Best Play		Nominated	
1983	Susan Smith Blackburn Prize			Won	
