= Conan O'Brien Show =

Conan O'Brien Show may refer to:

- Late Night with Conan O'Brien (1993–2009), NBC
- The Tonight Show with Conan O'Brien (2009–2010), NBC
- Conan (talk show) (2010–2021), TBS
- The Legally Prohibited from Being Funny on Television Tour (2010), a live comedy show across the US and Canada
