= Rodman Flender =

American filmmaker (born 1962)

- Born: June 9, 1962 (age 64); New York City, U.S.
- Education: Harvard University
- Occupations: Filmmaker; actor
- Spouse: Amy Lippman (m. 1990)
- Relatives: Timothée Chalamet (nephew); Pauline Chalamet (niece)

Rodman Flender (born June 9, 1962) is an American filmmaker and actor. Born and raised in a Jewish family in New York City, Flender's early experiences in the arts included roles on Broadway and PBS series. He developed his acting skills at New York's High School of Performing Arts and the Webber Douglas Academy of Dramatic Art in London, before pursuing higher education at Harvard University. At Harvard, he contributed to The Harvard Lampoon and studied documentary filmmaking, which laid the foundation for his career in entertainment.

Starting his career in the advertising department of Roger Corman's Concorde-New Horizons Films, Flender transitioned into production and direction, making his debut with the thriller The Unborn (1991). His directing credits include the feature films Leprechaun 2 (1994) and Idle Hands (1999), as well as television episodes for series such as The Office, Ugly Betty and Gilmore Girls. Flender's documentary work includes Let Them Eat Rock (2004), a musical portrait of the band The Upper Crust, and Conan O'Brien Can't Stop (2011), which documents Conan O'Brien's comedy tour following the 2010 Tonight Show conflict. The latter was recognized by Roger Ebert as one of the best documentaries of 2011.

In recent years, Flender has returned to character-based drama and ventured into romantic comedy and horror, as seen in his feature film Eat, Brains, Love, which premiered at the FrightFest film festival in London to positive reviews and won Best Picture at the 2019 Screamfest Horror Film Festival.

== Early life and education ==
Flender was born and raised in New York City, the son of Enid (née Rodman; 1927–2022), a former Broadway dancer, and Harold Flender (1924–1975), a writer and screenwriter, whose book Paris Blues (1957), was adapted into the 1961 film of the same name, starring Sidney Poitier and Paul Newman. He is of Russian Jewish descent on his mother's side and Austrian Jewish on his father's side. He grew up in an apartment on Riverside Drive on the Upper West Side, with his older sister Nicole, but after their father died in 1975 they moved with their mother to the federally subsidized artists' building Manhattan Plaza in Hell's Kitchen, under the Mitchell–Lama program, one of the first families to do so. His sister has described their family as "culturally Jewish but not religiously observant". Flender's early acting roles included Mischa in the Broadway production of Zalmen or the Madness of God and Charles Francis Adams in the PBS series The Adams Chronicles.

Flender graduated from the drama department of New York's High School of Performing Arts and studied acting at the Webber Douglas Academy of Dramatic Art in London. Flender attended Harvard University where he majored in visual and environmental studies, and studied documentary filmmaking with Ed Pincus and Ross McElwee, who inspired him with an enthusiasm for the documentaries. During that time, Flender was a writer for The Harvard Lampoon, where he met close friend Conan O'Brien. He graduated in 1984.

== Career ==
Independent filmmaker Roger Corman hired Flender out of university to run the advertising department of his Concorde-New Horizons Films. With his goal toward directing, Flender moved into production and was Corman's Vice President of Production for two years. He produced or co-produced titles including Body Chemistry, Streets, and Full Fathom Five. Flender made his feature directing debut with the Corman-produced thriller The Unborn, which received favorable reviews. Flender next wrote and directed In The Heat of Passion, also for Roger Corman.

Over the next decade, Flender's feature directing credits included Leprechaun 2 for Trimark and the Columbia Pictures release Idle Hands. Flender became a director of television episodes and pilots. TV credits include multiple episodes of the comedies The Office and Ugly Betty, dramas that include Chicago Hope, Gilmore Girls and The O.C., and horror with HBO's Tales from the Crypt. As a writer, Flender's credits include Tales from the Crypt and the feature film Roger Corman’s Dracula Rising.

In 1998, Flender began filming a documentary on the Boston-based rock band The Upper Crust and directed the Dawson's Creek episode "The Scare", a parody of Scream. Developments within the band led Flender to continue shooting on and off for the next five years. The resulting documentary, Let Them Eat Rock, was played at film festivals in 2005 and 2006 to mostly positive notices. Following the 2010 Tonight Show conflict, Flender joined Conan O'Brien on the road, as part of the Legally Prohibited from Being Funny on Television Tour, and filmed the ongoings behind-the-scenes, onstage and between shows. The documentary, titled Conan O'Brien Can't Stop, was released in select theatres on June 24, 2011. Roger Ebert included it on his list of best documentaries of 2011.

With the documentary completed, Flender returned to directing television, including episodes of the comedies Suburgatory and Super Fun Night in 2014, the drama Finding Carter and multiple episodes of the thriller Scream in 2015 and 2016. Flender directed two episodes of the 2016-2017 science fiction series People of Earth and returned to character-based drama in 2019, directing Kirsten Dunst in the Showtime original series On Becoming a God in Central Florida.

In 2019, Flender completed the film Eat, Brains, Love, which mixes romantic comedy, horror and road movie. It premiered at the FrightFest film festival to positive reviews and won Best Picture at the 2019 Screamfest Horror Film Festival. In 2022, footage from the Dawson's Creek episode "The Scare", which Flender directed, was incorporated into the Matt Bettinelli-Olpin and Tyler Gillett 2022 film Scream.

== Personal life ==
Flender lives in Los Angeles with his wife, writer and producer Amy Lippman. They also own a house in Carpinteria, California. They have a son, Haskell, who also attended Harvard University and was a member of The Harvard Lampoon. He was named after cinematographer Haskell Wexler.

Flender is the uncle of actors Timothée and Pauline Chalamet.
