= Thomas Francis and Ruth Reardon O'Brien =

Parents of Conan O'Brien (1929/1931–2024)

- Born: Thomas Francis O'Brien January 28, 1929 Worcester, U.S.; Ruth Mary Reardon December 16, 1931 Worcester, U.S.
- Died: Thomas December 9, 2024 (aged 95) Brookline, Massachusetts, U.S.; Ruth December 12, 2024 (aged 92) Brookline, Massachusetts, U.S.
- Known for: Thomas Founding the World Health Organization's Collaborating Center for Surveillance of Antimicrobial Resistance; Ruth Being the 2nd female partner at Ropes & Gray
- Children: 6 including Conan O'Brien

Thomas Francis O'Brien (January 28, 1929 – December 9, 2024), a professor and microbiologist, and Ruth Reardon O'Brien (née Reardon; December 16, 1931 – December 12, 2024), an attorney, were an American couple who were the parents of television host and comedian Conan O'Brien.

Thomas was a microbiologist at Harvard Medical School who was known for his work in antimicrobial resistance; he was also the co-founder of the World Health Organization's Collaborating Center for Surveillance of Antimicrobial Resistance and the creator of the medical database WHONET. Ruth was the second female lawyer to become a partner at Ropes & Gray; there, she was an attorney for its real estate department.

== Early lives and education ==
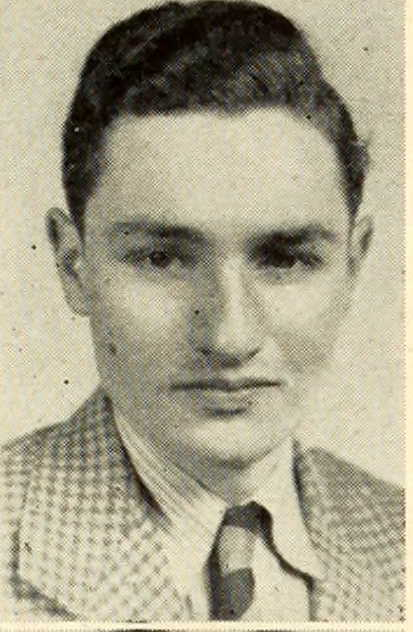
Thomas Francis O'Brien in 1946

Thomas Francis O'Brien was born in Worcester, Massachusetts, to Mr. and Mrs. Francis N. O'Brien on January 28, 1929. He graduated from Mary E. Wells High School in 1949; he then received his bachelor's degree in classics at the College of the Holy Cross in 1950 before graduating from Harvard Medical School with a full scholarship, and finishing his residency at Peter Bent Brigham Hospital in 1954. After graduating, he had a fellowship at Cambridge University before he then served as the captain of the U.S. Army Medical Corps for 2 years in San Antonio.

Ruth Mary Reardon was also born in Worcester, on December 16, 1931; she was the youngest of the 3 children of Mr. and Mrs. James F. Reardon. She attended South High School and received her bachelor's degree from Vassar College in 1953. She then attended Yale Law School, where she was one of the only four women in her class before graduating in 1956.

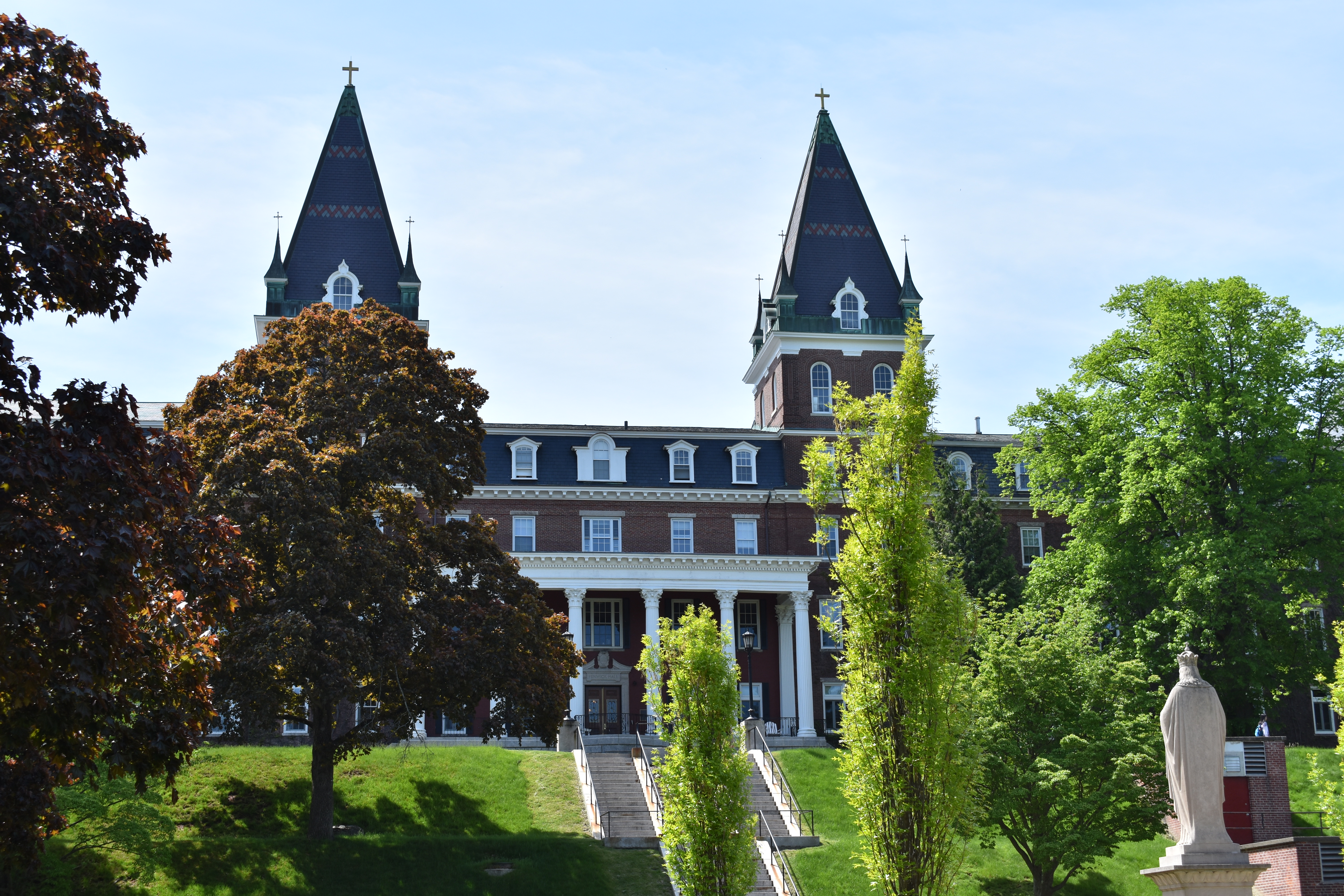
The College of the Holy Cross, the school Thomas O'Brien and the Reardon brothers attended together.

Ruth's brothers had been classmates and friends with Thomas at the College of the Holy Cross. During a visit to the Reardon family home, he met Ruth for the first time. The two would later marry at the Blessed Sacrament Roman Catholic Church on August 23, 1958.

== Careers ==
=== Thomas ===
Thomas was a microbiologist and an associate professor at Harvard Medical School. He was also the first director of the infectious diseases division at Brigham and Women's Hospital. In 1985, he co-founded the World Health Organization's Collaborating Center for Surveillance of Antimicrobial Resistance with Dr. John Sterling. In 1989, he and Sterling released the medical site WHONET, a database tracking antibiotic resistance. He retired in 2019.

=== Ruth ===
In 1956, Ruth started out as the law clerk of Chief Justice Raymond Sanger Wilkins at the Massachusetts Supreme Judicial Court. She held the position until 1957, when she became a real estate attorney at Ropes & Gray. She stopped working in 1958, but later returned to the firm in 1971. In 1978, Ruth became Ropes & Gray's second female partner. She retired in 1996.

== Family ==
The O'Briens were of Irish heritage, and they had 6 children, 4 sons and 2 daughters:

- Neal O'Brien (born 1960), a lawyer
- Luke O'Brien (born 1961), a lawyer
- Conan Christopher O'Brien (born 1963), television host and comedian
- Kate B. O'Brien (born 1965), an actress
- Jane C. O'Brien (born 1967), a television screenwriter
- Justin O'Brien (born 1972), a lawyer

== Deaths ==
The O'Briens died in their Brookline home 3 days apart from each other; Thomas on December 9, 2024, aged 95, and Ruth on December 12, 2024, aged 92. Their joint mass was held on December 18, 2024, in Chestnut Hill, Massachusetts, with an obituary released by the Bell-O'Dea Funeral Home.
