= Let Them Eat Rock =

2004 film by Rodman Flender

- Directed by: Rodman Flender
- Release date: 2004
- Running time: 87 min.
- Country: United States
- Language: English

Let Them Eat Rock is a 2004 documentary film by Rodman Flender that follows five eventful years in the Boston-based rock band The Upper Crust.

Flender began filming the band in 1997. He put the project on hold to direct the horror-comedy movie Idle Hands. When he returned to finish editing, guitarist and singer Edward L. Widmer had left the group to become a speechwriter in the Clinton White House. Flender started shooting again to include this turn of events. The documentary played film festivals in 2005 and 2006 to mostly positive notices.
