= Conan O'Brien Can't Stop =

2011 film by Rodman Flender

- Film poster
- Directed by: Rodman Flender
- Produced by: Gavin Polone; Rachel Griffin
- Starring: Conan O'Brien; Andy Richter; Sona Movsesian; Jimmy Vivino; Scott Healy; Mike Merritt; James Wormworth; Jerry Vivino; Mark Pender; Richie Rosenberg; Rachael L. Hollingsworth; Fredericka Meek
- Cinematography: Rodman Flender
- Edited by: Rodman Flender
- Production company: Pariah
- Distributed by: Abramorama; Magnolia Pictures
- Release date: June 24, 2011 (United States)
- Running time: 89 minutes
- Country: United States
- Language: English
- Box office: $267,965 (US)

Conan O'Brien Can't Stop is a 2011 documentary film by Rodman Flender featuring Conan O'Brien and focusing on his comedy tour, The Legally Prohibited from Being Funny on Television Tour, which took place in 2010 following his departure from The Tonight Show with Conan O'Brien due to the controversial 2010 Tonight Show conflict.

== Synopsis ==
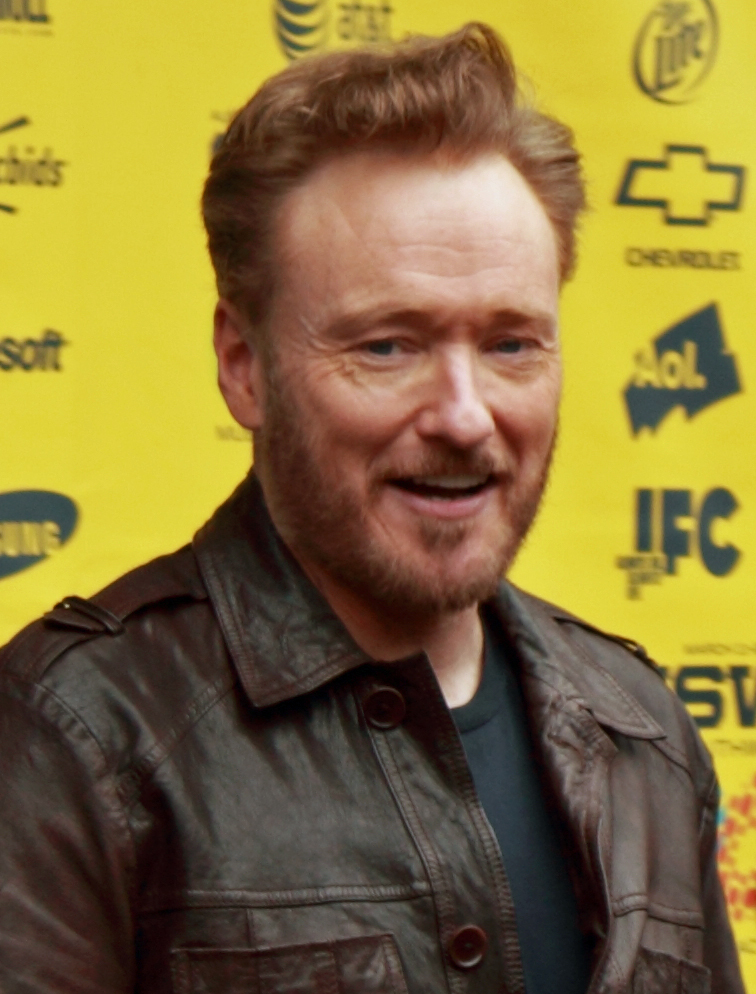
O'Brien promoted the film at the 2011 SXSW convention

The film opens with a short segment explaining the events which transpired to culminate in O'Brien's launch of the Legally Prohibited Tour. It focuses on the rift with NBC and the outpouring of support shown by his fans while the fiasco played out.

The documentary continues with O'Brien explaining that the idea for the tour came to them while thinking of things they could do in the six months after his exit from NBC, during which time he was legally prohibited from appearing on television, radio, or the Internet. The following segments show glimpses of the thought process for the tour, and then an extremely nervous O'Brien and team members as they wait in realtime to see the results of whether or not their show would sell. All the venues begin to sell out at a fast pace and the stage is set for them to proceed with the planning of the tour.

The rest of the documentary details the creative process behind various jokes/musical acts by O'Brien's team. In between segments of the live show, the film depicts O'Brien interacting with fans, attending functions, hosting an entire day at Bonnaroo and encounters with celebrities (such as Jon Hamm, Jack McBrayer, Jack Black, Kyle Gass, Jon Stewart, Stephen Colbert, Jim Carrey and Eddie Vedder, the latter four appearing on the show) are shown — not all of which are pleasant for an increasingly exhausted O'Brien as the tour progresses. O'Brien worries that he will get burned out and be unable to return to television, leaving his team without jobs. He holds a secret show for his fans at the studio of Jack White, with White participating in the show itself.

During the film there is little interviewing between O'Brien and director Rodman Flender, though the few questions that are captured are answered in great detail. A constant companion during the entire documentary is O'Brien's personal assistant, Sona Movsesian, with whom he shares humorous (yet occasionally passive aggressive) banter throughout the film.

The documentary ends with a title card displaying the end date of the tour and that O'Brien had a few weeks off before starting his next assignment as the host of his cable talk show at TBS, a shot of O'Brien walking out onto the studio stage after the Conan theme is played by the band is shown after the title card. A performance at Jack White's studio is played while the credits roll.

== Reception ==
The documentary was given a limited release, and it was generally well-received by film critics. On the movie review website Rotten Tomatoes, the film has received an aggregated score of 82% from 77 reviews. Film critic Roger Ebert gave the documentary three out of four stars, stating, "To be sure, NBC paid him $40 million in a send-off package, but the Conan O'Brien we see in the film wasn't in it for the money. He was in it because he can't stop." The New York Times review by Stephen Holden was critical of the film's subject and its direction which left much of the tour's performances off camera, stating, "The film spends too much time with Mr. O'Brien and his team backstage, where he is the needy focus of attention at all times." Holden did state though, that as a whole, the documentary is "consistently watchable".
