= 5th NFL Honors =

2016 American football awards ceremony

- Date: February 6, 2016
- Site: Bill Graham Civic Auditorium (San Francisco, California)
- Hosted by: Conan O'Brien

Television coverage
- Network: CBS/CBS All Access
- Duration: 2 hours

The 5th NFL Honors was an awards presentation by the National Football League honoring its best players from the 2015 NFL season. It was held on February 6, 2016, and aired on CBS (and streamed on CBS All Access for the first time)in the United States at 9:00 PM EST. Comedian Conan O'Brien hosted the show.

== List of award winners ==
Award	Player	Position	Team	Ref
AP MVP	Cam Newton	QB	Carolina Panthers	
AP Coach of the Year	Ron Rivera	HC	Carolina Panthers	
AP Assistant Coach of the Year	Wade Phillips	DC	Denver Broncos	
AP Offensive Player of the Year	Cam Newton	QB	Carolina Panthers	
AP Defensive Player of the Year	J. J. Watt	DE	Houston Texans	
Pepsi NEXT Rookie of the Year	Jameis Winston	QB	Tampa Bay Buccaneers	
AP Offensive Rookie of the Year	Todd Gurley	RB	St. Louis Rams	
AP Defensive Rookie of the Year	Marcus Peters	CB	Kansas City Chiefs	
AP Comeback Player of the Year	Eric Berry	FS	Kansas City Chiefs	
NFL.com Fantasy Player of the Year	Antonio Brown	WR	Pittsburgh Steelers	
Don Shula NFL High School Coach of the Year award	Michael Burnett	HC	Tuscarora High School (Virginia)	
Walter Payton NFL Man of the Year award	Anquan Boldin	WR	San Francisco 49ers	
FedEx Air Player of the Year	Carson Palmer	QB	Arizona Cardinals	
FedEx Ground Player of the Year	Adrian Peterson	RB	Minnesota Vikings	
Bridgestone Performance Play of the Year	Aaron Rodgers and Richard Rodgers	QB, TE	Green Bay Packers	
Greatness on the Road award	Antonio Brown	WR	Pittsburgh Steelers	
Salute to Service award	Vincent Jackson	WR	Tampa Bay Buccaneers	
Deacon Jones Award	J. J. Watt	DE	Houston Texans	
Art Rooney Award	Charles Woodson	CB	Oakland Raiders	
