= Narek Margaryan =

Armenian comedian

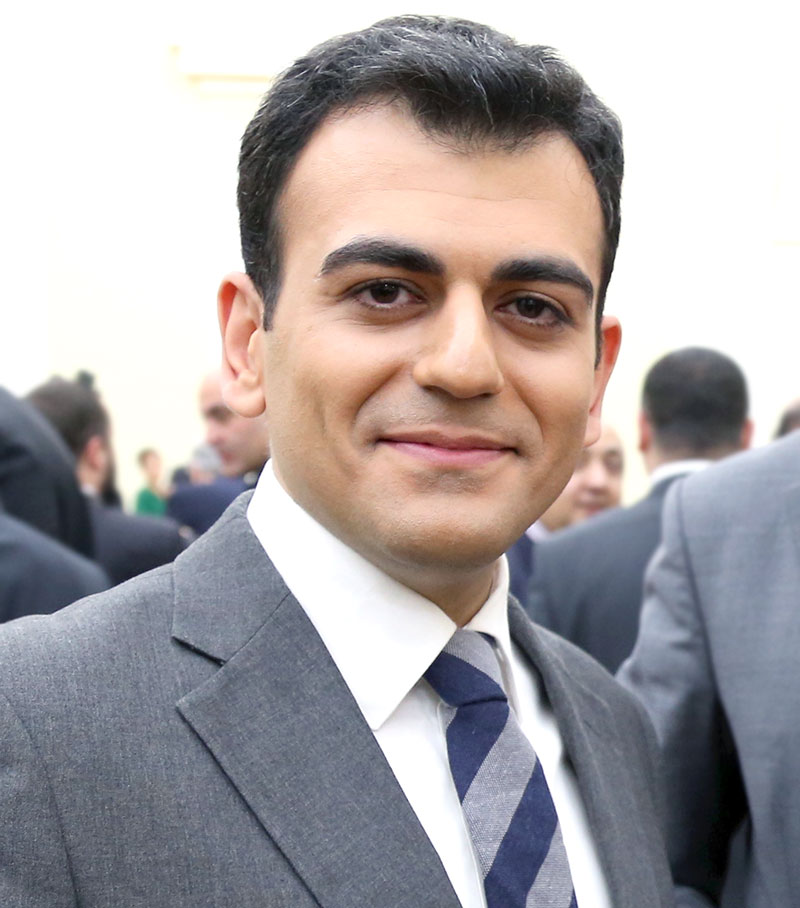
- Born: September 14, 1983 (age 43); Yerevan, Soviet Union (now Armenia)
- Notable work: ArmComedy (2012), The Knight's Move (2013)

Comedy career
- Years active: 2007—present
- Genres: Satire, Stand-up

Narek Margaryan (Armenian: Նարեկ Մարգարյան, born September 14, 1983) is an Armenian comedian, screenwriter and TV host.

Since 2007, with his friend, comedian, and writer Sergey Sargsyan he wrote, directed, and performed a series of stand-up comedy shows.

In 2009, Narek Margaryan and Sergey Sargsyan started ArmComedy first satiric news site in Armenia giving a fresh, funny, and controversial interpretation of on current Armenian social and political developments. In 2010, ArmComedy won ArmNet Award for Armenian website with best content . Same year Narek Margaryan and Sergey Sargsyan start producing satiric news show series for the Internet under the title 3D Update. After 19 episodes, the show was rebooted as NewsՀաբ and ran on the CivilNet Internet television channel for 42 episodes.

In March 2012, the show moved to ArmNews TV channel and in 2015 on ATV where it currently runs under a new title ArmComedy . It is the first show in Armenia to start as a web series and make a transition from web to network television.

Narek Margaryan holds a PhD in English and was a professor at Yerevan State Linguistic University after V. Brusov for 2 years. In 2011 after a satiric sketch about the University appeared on Youtube he was fired, despite protests by students . Ex-rector Suren Zolyan organized mass viewing of the sketch at a staff meeting. Margaryan returned to university once a new rector was appointed.

In 2013, Narek Margaryan and Sergey Sargsyan wrote the screenplay for The Knight's Move, their very first feature movie. In that road movie comedy, a fictional chess champion gets hold of Temur Lang's ruby and is chased by an ancient and mystical Kazakh order.

In 2016, Narek Margaryan and Sergey Sargsyan wrote a screenplay for Head of State , Armenia's first political feature comedy.

In May 2017, Narek Margaryan and Sergey Sargsyan were on US standup tour and were invited as guests on Conan.
