= Conan O'Brien =

American television host and comedian (born 1963)

- O'Brien in 2025
- Born: Conan Christopher O'Brien; April 18, 1963 (age 63); Boston, Massachusetts, U.S.
- Education: Harvard University (BA)
- Notable work: Saturday Night Live (writer, 1988–1991); The Simpsons (writer, producer, 1991–1993); Late Night with Conan O'Brien (host, 1993–2009); The Tonight Show with Conan O'Brien (host, 2009–2010); Conan (host, 2010–2021); Conan O'Brien Needs a Friend (host, 2018–present)
- Spouse: Liza Powel (m. 2002)
- Children: 2
- Relatives: Denis Leary (third cousin once removed)

Comedy career
- Years active: 1983–present
- Medium: Television; film; podcast
- Genres: Improvisational comedy; sketch comedy; physical comedy; surreal humor; black comedy; musical comedy
- Subjects: American culture; everyday life; pop culture; current events; social awkwardness; self-deprecation

Conan Christopher O'Brien (born April 18, 1963) is an American television host, comedian, writer, actor, and podcaster. He hosted several late-night talk shows, beginning with Late Night with Conan O'Brien (1993–2009) and The Tonight Show with Conan O'Brien (2009–2010) on the NBC television network, and Conan (2010–2021) on the cable channel TBS. Before his hosting career, O'Brien was a writer for the NBC sketch comedy series Saturday Night Live from 1988 to 1991, and the Fox animated sitcom The Simpsons from 1991 to 1993. He has hosted the podcast series Conan O'Brien Needs a Friend since 2018, and starred in the travel show Conan O'Brien Must Go on HBO Max since 2024.

Born in Boston, Massachusetts, O'Brien was raised in an Irish Catholic family. He served as president of The Harvard Lampoon while attending Harvard University, where he graduated with a degree in history and literature. He was a writer for the sketch comedy series Not Necessarily the News. After writing for several comedy shows in Los Angeles, he joined the writing staff of Saturday Night Live. O'Brien was a writer and producer for The Simpsons for two seasons until he was selected by Lorne Michaels and NBC to take over David Letterman's position as host of Late Night in 1993. Despite unfavorable reviews and threats of cancellation in the show's first years, O'Brien and the show developed and became highly regarded, earning a Primetime Emmy Award. He hosted Late Night for 16 years, and as of 2026 is still the longest-serving host in the history of the franchise.

In 2009, O'Brien moved from New York to Los Angeles to host his own incarnation of The Tonight Show for seven months until highly publicized network politics prompted a host change in 2010. After this departure, O'Brien hosted a 32-city live comedy tour titled The Legally Prohibited from Being Funny on Television Tour, which was the subject of the documentary Conan O'Brien Can't Stop (2011). He then hosted Conan from 2010 to 2021. Throughout his career, he has also hosted a number of awards shows and television specials, including the Emmy Awards in 2002 and 2006, the White House Correspondents' Dinner in 1995 and 2013, and the Academy Awards in 2025, 2026, and 2027. O'Brien was named one of Time's 100 Most Influential People in 2010, and was inducted into the Television Academy Hall of Fame in 2025. He is the 2025 recipient of the Mark Twain Prize for American Humor.

Known for his spontaneous hosting style, which has been characterized by The New York Times as "awkward, self-deprecating humor", O'Brien's late-night programs combine the "lewd and wacky with more elegant, narrative-driven short films". His remotes have also become some of his best-received work, including the international travel series Conan Without Borders. With the retirement of David Letterman on May 20, 2015, O'Brien became the longest-working late-night talk show host active in the United States. This active streak ended with O'Brien's retirement from late-night television in June 2021, with his entire run as a late-night host lasting nearly 30 years.

== Early life ==
Conan Christopher O'Brien was born on April 18, 1963, in Boston, Massachusetts, and grew up in the suburb of Brookline. His father, Thomas Francis O'Brien (1929–2024), was a physician and professor of medicine at Harvard Medical School, specializing in epidemiology. His mother, Ruth O'Brien (née Reardon; 1931–2024), was an attorney and partner at the Boston firm Ropes & Gray. O'Brien has three brothers and two sisters, and is a third cousin once removed of fellow comedian Denis Leary. His family had a tradition of attending the College of the Holy Cross in Worcester, Massachusetts, for college; O'Brien later recalled, "Half my family went to Holy Cross. And they call it ‘The Cross.’"

O'Brien attended Brookline High School, where he served as the managing editor of the school newspaper, then called The Sagamore. He was a congressional intern for Congressmen Robert Drinan and Barney Frank, and in his senior year won the National Council of Teachers of English writing contest with his short story "To Bury the Living". After graduating as valedictorian in 1981, O'Brien entered Harvard University. He lived in Holworthy Hall during his first year with future businessman Luis Ubiñas and two other roommates, and in Mather House during his sophomore and two upper-class years. He majored in history and literature, and graduated magna cum laude with a Bachelor of Arts degree in 1985. O'Brien's senior thesis, entitled Literary Progeria in the Works of William Faulkner and Flannery O'Connor, concerned the use of children as symbols in the works of Faulkner and O'Connor.

During college, O'Brien briefly played drums in a band called the Bad Clams and was a writer for the Harvard Lampoon humor magazine. During his sophomore and junior years, he served as the Lampoon's president. At this time, O'Brien's future boss at NBC, Jeff Zucker, was serving as president of the school newspaper The Harvard Crimson.

== Career ==
=== Early writing jobs and Saturday Night Live (1985–1991) ===
After graduating from Harvard, O'Brien moved to Los Angeles to join the writing staff of HBO's sketch comedy series Not Necessarily the News, where he worked for two seasons. Around this time, he started taking improvisation classes with Cynthia Szigeti and The Groundlings. His next job as a writer was on the short-lived The Wilton North Report. In January 1988, Saturday Night Live (SNL) executive producer Lorne Michaels hired O'Brien as a writer. During his three years on SNL, he wrote such recurring sketches as "Mr. Short-Term memory" and "The Girl Watchers"; the latter was first performed by Tom Hanks and Jon Lovitz.

While on a writers' strike from Saturday Night Live following the 1987–88 season, O'Brien put on an improvisational comedy revue in Chicago with fellow SNL writers Bob Odenkirk and Robert Smigel called Happy Happy Good Show. While living in Chicago, O'Brien briefly shared an apartment with Jeff Garlin near Wrigley Field. In 1989, O'Brien and his fellow SNL writers received an Emmy Award for Outstanding Writing for a Variety Series.

O'Brien, like many SNL writers, occasionally appeared as an extra in sketches; his most notable appearance was as a doorman in a sketch in which Tom Hanks was inducted into the SNL "Five-Timers Club" for hosting his fifth episode in 1990. O'Brien and Robert Smigel wrote the television pilot for Lookwell starring Adam West, which aired on NBC in 1991. Even with support from NBC president Brandon Tartikoff, the pilot never went to series. Despite the negative reviews, it became a cult hit. It was later screened at The Other Network, a festival of unaired TV pilots produced by Un-Cabaret; it featured an extended interview with O'Brien and was rerun in 2002 on the Trio network.

In 1991, after the failure of his sitcom, O'Brien also had an engagement to be married fall through and he quit Saturday Night Live, citing burnout. "I told Lorne Michaels I couldn't come back to work and I just needed to do something else," O'Brien recalled. "I had no plan whatsoever. I was literally in this big transition phase in my life where I decided, I'll just walk around New York City, and an idea will come to me." O'Brien would later return to the show as host in 2001, and in a 2022 cameo appearance.

=== The Simpsons (1991–1993) ===
I was very nervous when I started. They showed me into this office and told me to start writing down some ideas. They left me alone in that office. I left after five minutes to go get a cup of coffee. I heard a crash. I walked back to the office, and there was a hole in the window and a dead bird on the floor. Literally, in my first ten minutes at The Simpsons, a bird had flown through the glass of my window, hit the far wall, broken its neck, and fallen dead on the floor. George Meyer came in and looked at it, and said, "Man, this is some kind of weird omen."

— O'Brien on his first moments at The Simpsons

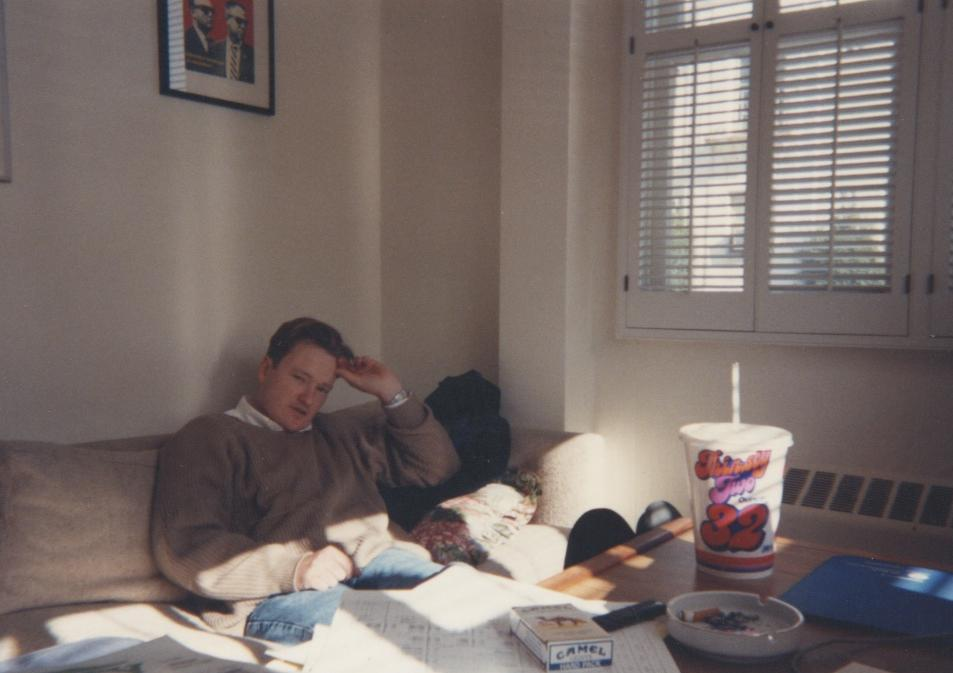
O'Brien in the offices of the writers of The Simpsons, 1992

Mike Reiss and Al Jean, then showrunners of the animated sitcom The Simpsons, called O'Brien and offered him a job. The series was prestigious in the writing community at the time; O'Brien recalls "everyone wanted to be on that show, but they never hired." O'Brien was one of the first hires after the show's original crew. With the help of an old Groundlings friend, actor Lisa Kudrow, O'Brien purchased an apartment in Beverly Hills. He and Kudrow became romantically involved as well, and Kudrow believed he should begin performing rather than writing. O'Brien disagreed, feeling that Kudrow was flattering him, and asserting he was happy as a writer. In his speech given at Class Day at Harvard in 2000, O'Brien credited The Simpsons with saving him, a reference to the career slump he was experiencing before being hired for the show.

From 1991 to 1993, O'Brien was a writer and producer for The Simpsons. When O'Brien first arrived at the Fox lot, they temporarily gave him writer Jeff Martin's office. O'Brien was nervous and self-conscious, feeling that he would embarrass himself in front of what he regarded as an intimidating collection of writers. O'Brien would pitch characters in their voices, as he thought that was the norm, until Reiss informed him that no one did this. He fit in quickly, commanding control of the room frequently; writer Josh Weinstein called it a "ten-hour Conan show, nonstop". According to John Ortved, one of his fellow writers said that O'Brien had been a shoo-in to take over as showrunner.

O'Brien wrote some of the series' most acclaimed episodes: "Marge vs. the Monorail" and "Homer Goes to College". The show was initially a highly realistic family sitcom; after O'Brien's debut, the show took a rapid shift in the direction of the surreal. O'Brien also has sole writing credits on "New Kid on the Block" and "Treehouse of Horror IV", on which he wrote the episode wraparounds. Wallace Wolodarsky described a "room character" O'Brien put on for the writers: "Conan used to do this thing called the Nervous Writer that involved him opening a can of Diet Coke and then nervously pitching a joke. He would spray Diet Coke all over himself, and that was always a source of endless amusement among us." During his time at The Simpsons, O'Brien also had a side project working with Smigel on the script for a musical film based on the "Hans and Franz" sketch from Saturday Night Live, but the film was never produced.

Meanwhile, David Letterman was preparing to leave the talk show Late Night, prompting executive producer Lorne Michaels to search for a new host. Michaels approached O'Brien to produce; then-agent Gavin Polone stressed that O'Brien wanted to perform, rather than produce. He arranged with Michaels that O'Brien would do a test audition on the stage of The Tonight Show. Jason Alexander and Mimi Rogers were the guests, and the audience was composed of Simpsons writers. Wolodarksky recalled the experience: "Seeing this friend of yours, this guy that you worked with, walk out from behind that curtain and deliver a monologue was like something you could only dream up that you couldn't ever imagine actually happening." The performance was beamed by satellite to New York, where Lorne Michaels and NBC executives watched. The audition was not well received by media commentators, citing his "awkward" humor.

O'Brien was picked as the new host of Late Night on April 26, 1993. As the writers headed to the voice record for "Homer Goes to College", O'Brien received a phone call from Polone informing him of the decision. "He was passed out facedown into this horrible shag carpet. He was just quiet and comatose down there on that carpet," recalled postproduction supervisor J. Michael Mendel. "I remember looking at him and saying, 'Wow. Your life is about to change, in a really dramatic way.'" Fox, however, would not let O'Brien out of his contract. Eventually, NBC and O'Brien split the cost to get him out of the contract. During pre-production, writer Robert Smigel suggested fellow writer Andy Richter to sit beside O'Brien and act as a sidekick. After O'Brien's departure, the writers at The Simpsons would watch videotaped episodes of Late Night at lunch the day following their midnight broadcast and analyze them.

=== Late Night (1993–2009) ===
Late Night with Conan O'Brien, originating from Studio 6A at 30 Rockefeller Plaza in New York City, premiered on September 13, 1993, to unfavorable reviews from contemporary critics. This reception was not completely unsurprising: there was significant public apprehension due to O'Brien being virtually unknown to the public, and O'Brien himself wrote a self-deprecating The New York Times piece titled "O'Brien Flops!" on the day of the show's premiere. Critics attacked O'Brien: Tom Shales of The Washington Post suggested that "the host resume his previous identity, Conan O'Blivion." Generally, critics viewed O'Brien as nervous and fidgety on-camera, and that he was "too smart, too East Coast, too sophisticated, too young and even too tall to be successful." The show was constantly at risk for cancellation; at one low point in 1994, NBC threatened to put him on a week-to-week contract. Executives were anxious to replace him with Greg Kinnear, who followed O'Brien with Later at 1:30 am. Interns filled empty seats in the audience while affiliates began to inquire about replacement hosts. In one installment after a short stretch of reruns, sidekick Andy Richter described his vacation activities as follows: "I sat back and reminded myself what it's like to be unemployed." The in-joke alluded to the rumors floating in the trades that NBC was near canceling the program.

Late Night under O'Brien slowly but steadily acquired commercial and critical success. Sketches grew in popularity ("If They Mated", "Desk Drive", "In the Year 2000"). A reliable staple involved a TV screen, lowered behind O'Brien's desk and displaying a still photo of a news figure. The lips and voice of these characters (Clutch Cargo) – frequently a party-crazed "hillbilly" interpretation of Bill Clinton – were supplied by writing partner Robert Smigel. A turning point was David Letterman's February 1994 appearance. "It was a morale boost," said O'Brien. "I'm thinking, If the guy who created the 12:30 thing comes on and says we're smart and funny, let's go." The show went through a wobble in January 1995 when Robert Smigel, feeling burned out, quit as head writer. An increase in quality over time, perceived by some observers, was sometimes credited to a growth in O'Brien's comedic performance. Within a year, a comedic formula began to arise: the show would combine the lewd and wacky with more elegant, narrative-driven remotes. One famous remote was when O'Brien visited a historic, Civil War-era baseball league. That piece was one of O'Brien's personal favorites, later remarking, "When I leave this earth, at the funeral, just show this, because this pretty much says who I'm all about."

O'Brien's audience, largely young and male (a coveted demographic), grew steadily and the show began to best competitors in the ratings, and continued to do so for 15 seasons. In the early days of the Internet, fans launched unofficial websites, compiling precise summaries of each episode. Even Tom Shales was a convert: he called the show "one of the most amazing transformations in television history." Beginning in 1996, O'Brien and the Late Night writing team were nominated annually for the Emmy Award for Best Writing in a Comedy or Variety Series, winning the award for the first and only time in 2007. In 1997, 2000, 2002, 2003, and 2004, he and the Late Night writing staff won the Writers Guild Award for Best Writing in a Comedy/Variety Series. In 2001, he formed his own television production company, Conaco, which subsequently shared in the production credits for Late Night. That same year, he returned to Saturday Night Live, hosting the show during its 26th season.

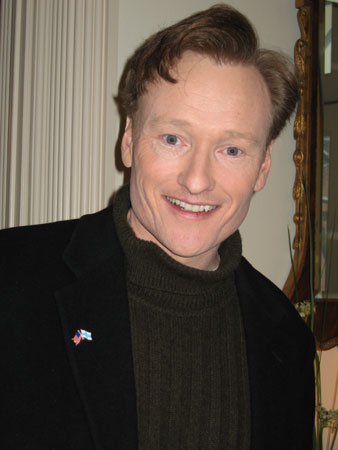
O'Brien at the US Embassy in Helsinki in 2006

As of October 2005, Late Night with Conan O'Brien had for eleven years consistently attracted an audience averaging about 2.5 million viewers. In 2006, O'Brien exploited his perceived resemblance to Tarja Halonen, entering her second term as president of Finland. Capitalizing on the resemblance and on the 2006 Finnish presidential election, O'Brien and Late Night aired mock political ads both in support of Halonen and against her main opponent Sauli Niinistö, which influenced popular perception of the race, which Halonen eventually won. O'Brien traveled to Finland shortly after the election. "We took the show to Helsinki for five days," O'Brien recalled, "where we were embraced like a national treasure." As part of the five-day trip, which was released as a one-hour special episode of Late Night, O'Brien met with Halonen at the Finnish Presidential Palace.

During the writers' strike in 2008, O'Brien staged a mock feud with Comedy Central's Jon Stewart (of The Daily Show) and Stephen Colbert (of The Colbert Report) over a dispute about which of the three were responsible for giving a "bump" to Mike Huckabee's campaign to become the Republican presidential nominee. This feud crossed over all three shows during the 2007–08 Writers Guild of America strike.

On February 20, 2009, NBC aired the last episode of Late Night with Conan O'Brien. The show consisted of a compilation of previous Late Night clips and included a surprise appearance by former sidekick Andy Richter. Will Ferrell, John Mayer, and the White Stripes also appeared. O'Brien ended the episode by destroying the set with an axe, handing out the pieces of the set to the audience, and thanking a list of people who helped him. Among those thanked were Lorne Michaels, David Letterman, Jay Leno, and O'Brien's wife and children.

In 2019, clips from O'Brien's time on Late Night began to be posted on his TBS website and on the Team Coco YouTube channel.

=== The Tonight Show (2009–2010) ===
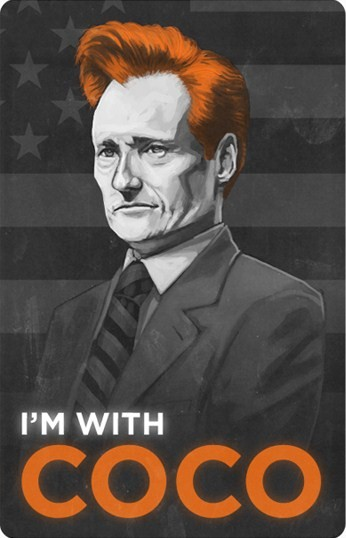
A poster created by Mike Mitchell during the 2010 Tonight Show conflict displaying his "Coco" nickname

As part of a new contract negotiated with NBC in 2004, the network decided that O'Brien would take over The Tonight Show from Jay Leno in 2009. Leno then moved to a prime time slot, named The Jay Leno Show. Hosting The Tonight Show was a lifelong dream of O'Brien's, and the promise of succeeding Leno kept him in NBC's employ despite the fact that he likely could have secured a more lucrative deal at another network. O'Brien was a guest on Jay Leno's final episode of The Tonight Show. On June 1, 2009, Will Ferrell became Conan's first Tonight Show guest on the couch and Pearl Jam appeared as his first musical guest.

O'Brien acquired the nickname "Coco" after its use in the first "Twitter Tracker" sketch during the second episode of his Tonight Show run. Guest Tom Hanks used the nickname during his subsequent interview, even getting the audience to chant it. In reaction to the moniker, O'Brien remarked to Hanks in jest, "If that catches on, I'll sue you." During the taping of the Friday, September 25, 2009, episode of The Tonight Show, O'Brien suffered a mild concussion after he slipped and hit his head while running a race as part of a comedy sketch with guest Teri Hatcher. He was examined at a hospital and released the same day. A rerun was aired that night, but O'Brien returned to work the following Monday and poked fun at the incident.

By November 2009, ratings for O'Brien's The Tonight Show declined by around 2 million viewers since the previous year when Leno was host. On January 7, 2010, NBC executive Jeff Zucker met with Jay Leno and Conan O'Brien to discuss how to move Leno out of prime time, where his ratings were lackluster, and back into late night. It was proposed that O'Brien would remain as host of The Tonight Show, which would run at 12:05 am with Leno hosting a 30-minute show at 11:35 pm. Three days later, NBC Universal Television Entertainment chairman Jeff Gaspin confirmed that The Jay Leno Show would be moved to 11:35 pm following NBC's coverage of the 2010 Winter Olympics.

Every comedian, every comedian dreams of hosting The Tonight Show and—for seven months—I got to do it. I did it my way, with people I love, and I do not regret a second [of it].... All I ask is one thing, and I'm asking this particularly of young people that watch: Please do not be cynical. I hate cynicism; for the record it's my least favorite quality. It doesn't lead anywhere. Nobody in life gets exactly what they thought they were going to get. But if you work really hard and you're kind, amazing things will happen.

— Conan O'Brien, on his departure from The Tonight Show, January 22, 2010

Sources familiar with the situation stated that O'Brien was unhappy and disappointed with NBC's plan. On January 12, O'Brien released this statement: "I sincerely believe that delaying The Tonight Show into the next day to accommodate another comedy program will seriously damage what I consider to be the greatest franchise in the history of broadcasting. The Tonight Show at 12:05 simply isn't The Tonight Show." On January 21, 2010, it was announced that O'Brien had reached a deal with NBC that would see him exit The Tonight Show the next day. The deal also granted him $45 million, of which $12 million was designated for distribution to his staff, who had moved with O'Brien to Los Angeles from New York when he left Late Night.

The final Tonight Show with O'Brien aired January 22, 2010, and featured guests Tom Hanks, Steve Carell (who did an exit interview and shredded Conan's ID badge), Neil Young (singing "Long May You Run"), and Will Ferrell. For Ferrell's appearance, O'Brien played guitar with the band and Ferrell sang "Free Bird" while reprising his SNL cowbell. Ferrell's wife, Viveca Paulin, together with Ben Harper, Beck, and ZZ Top guitarist Billy Gibbons, also joined the band for this final performance.

Jay Leno returned to The Tonight Show following NBC's coverage of the 2010 Winter Olympic Games. Under the $45 million deal with NBC, O'Brien was allowed to start working for another network as soon as September 2010. Conan's rumored next networks ranged from Fox to Comedy Central. Other networks reportedly interested in O'Brien included TNT, HBO, FX, Showtime, Revision3, and even the NBCUniversal–owned USA Network.

=== Television hiatus and comedy tour (2010) ===
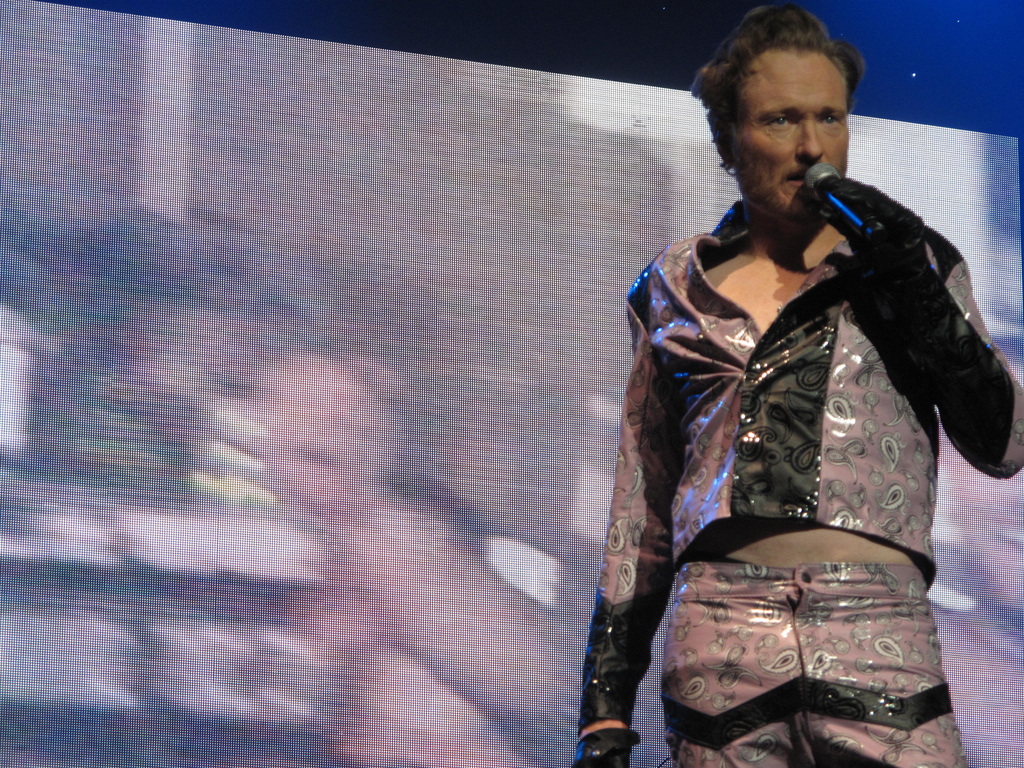
O'Brien performing in a replica of the costume Eddie Murphy wore in Eddie Murphy Raw (1987) in 2010

On February 8, 2010, it was reported that O'Brien was attempting to sell his Central Park West penthouse in New York with an asking price of $35 million. He had purchased the apartment in 2007 for $10 million. Two years earlier, O'Brien had purchased a home in the Brentwood section of Los Angeles for over $10.5 million. Some industry insiders have speculated that O'Brien had chosen to stay on the west coast in order to facilitate a return to late night television and because he did not want to put his children through another move.

O'Brien was included in the 2010 Time 100, a list compiled by Time of the 100 most influential people in the world as voted on by readers. After being prohibited from making television appearances of any kind until May, O'Brien spoke about the Tonight Show conflict on the CBS newsmagazine 60 Minutes on May 2, 2010. During the interview with Steve Kroft, O'Brien said the situation felt "like a marriage breaking up suddenly, violently, quickly. And I was just trying to figure out what happened." He also said he "absolutely" expected NBC to give him more of a chance and that, if in Jay Leno's position, he would not have come back to The Tonight Show. However, O'Brien said he did not feel unfortunate. "It's crucial to me that anyone seeing this, if they take anything away from this, it's I'm fine. I'm doing great," said O'Brien. "I hope people still find me comedically absurd and ridiculous. And I don't regret anything."

On March 11, 2010, O'Brien announced via his Twitter account that he would embark on a 30-city live tour beginning April 12, 2010, entitled, "The Legally Prohibited from Being Funny on Television Tour". Co-host Andy Richter, along with members of the former Tonight Show Band, joined O'Brien on the tour. Max Weinberg, however, was not able to join, except for a guest appearance at one of Conan's New York City shows. On April 12, 2010, O'Brien opened his two-month comedy tour in Eugene, Oregon, with a crowd of 2,500 and no TV cameras. The tour traveled through America's Northwest and Canada before moving on to larger cities, including Los Angeles and New York City, where he performed at Radio City Music Hall, next to his former Late Night studios. The tour ended in Atlanta on June 14. In 2011, the documentary film titled Conan O'Brien Can't Stop was released which followed O'Brien throughout his comedy tour. The film premiered March 2011 at the South by Southwest media festival to positive reviews. It was directed by Rodman Flender who is O'Brien's personal friend and classmate at Harvard University.

=== Conan and Conan Without Borders (2010–2021) ===
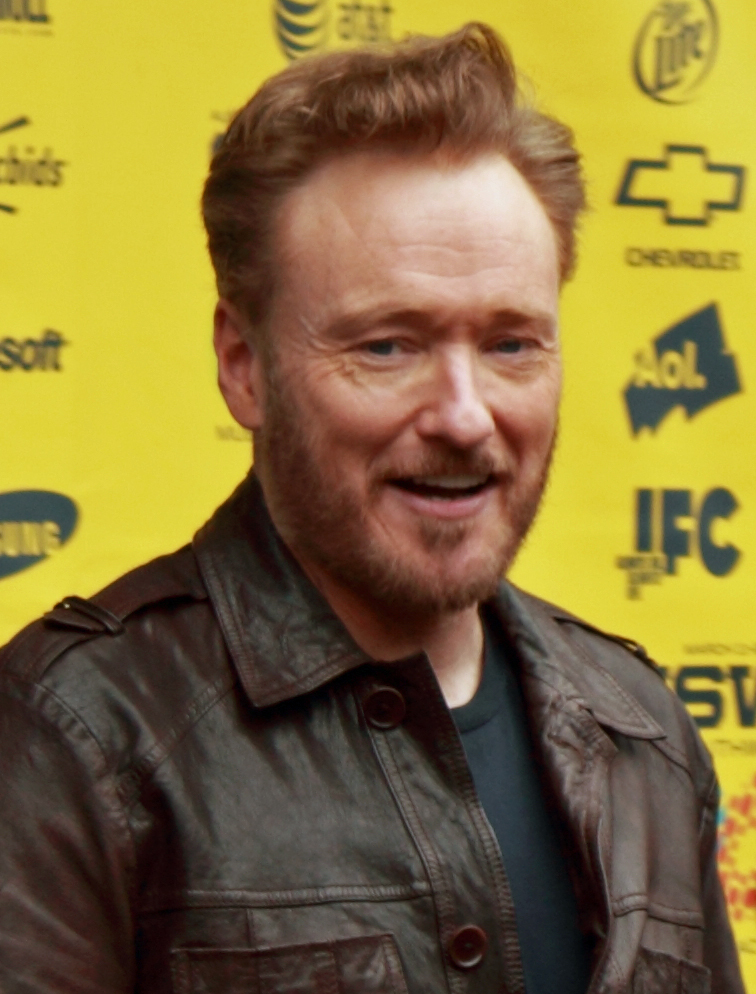
O'Brien promoting Conan O'Brien Can't Stop at the 2011 SXSW convention

The day his live tour began, O'Brien announced that he would host a new show on cable station TBS. The show, Conan, debuted on November 8, 2010, and aired Monday through Thursday at 11:00 pm ET/10:00 pm CT. O'Brien's addition moved Lopez Tonight with George Lopez back one hour. Refusing at first to do to Lopez what had happened to him at NBC, O'Brien agreed to join TBS after Lopez called to persuade him to come to TBS.

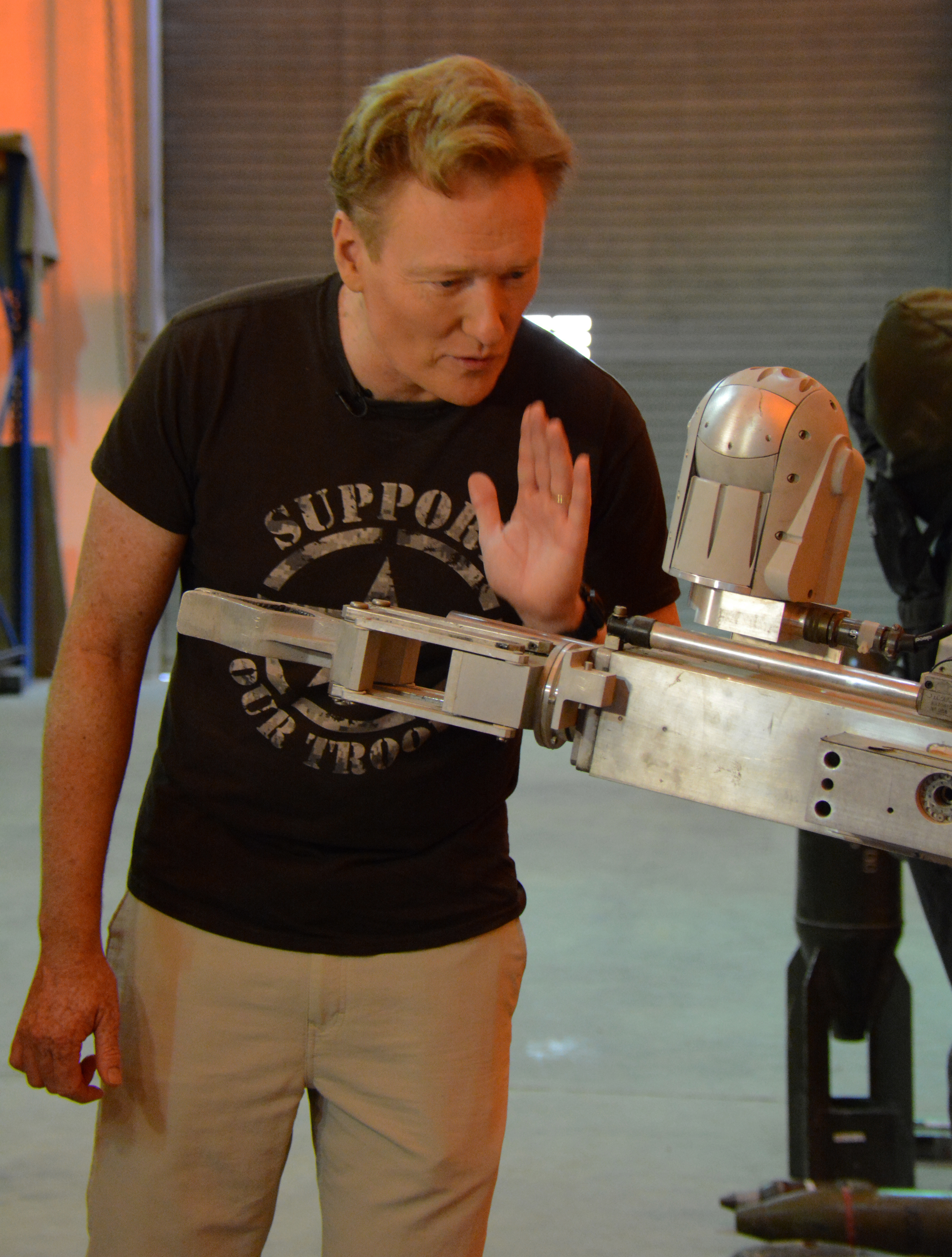
O'Brien at Al Udeid Air Base during "Conan in Qatar"

In February 2015, following the onset of the Cuban thaw, O'Brien became the first American television personality to film in Cuba for more than half a century. O'Brien then visited Armenia for his next show abroad, during which he featured his assistant Sona Movsesian, who is Armenian American. While visiting, O'Brien guest-starred as a gangster on an Armenian soap opera. In April 2016, O'Brien visited South Korea in response to a fan letter urging him to visit, as well as a growing fan base online. His visit included a trip to the Korean Demilitarized Zone, which resulted in O'Brien and Steven Yeun also visiting North Korea on a technicality by stepping across the border line at the DMZ. O'Brien commented on the significance during the sketch, claiming, "The idea that you and I could be in North Korea, talking and communicating freely, seems like kind of a cool message." These remotes were later branded Conan Without Borders and became part of their own series, with O'Brien eventually traveling to thirteen countries in total. The series became some of his most popular work, winning an Emmy in 2018. The international shows became available on Netflix before moving to HBO Max.

TBS extended the show through 2018 in 2014 and through 2022 in 2017. In late 2018, Conan took a three-month hiatus while O'Brien launched another national comedy tour. The show returned January 22, 2019, in a new half-hour format without the live band.

In response to the impact of the COVID-19 pandemic, the program switched to a remotely-produced format from O'Brien's home beginning March 30, 2020. In July 2020, it was announced that Conan would continue with this format, but would be filmed with limited on-site staff from the Largo at the Coronet in Los Angeles and no studio audience—making it the first American late-night talk show to return to filming outside of the host's residence (albeit still not from its main studio). In November 2020, TBS announced that Conan would end in June 2021. The final show aired on June 24, 2021, featuring a live audience and marking the end of O'Brien's twenty-eight year run as a late-night host. It was announced that O'Brien would move to a weekly untitled variety show on fellow WarnerMedia property HBO Max, where he was expected to focus more on his podcast and travel shows with a relaxed production schedule. On his final show, O'Brien featured fictional character Homer Simpson, marking also the three episodes that O'Brien wrote for the series. Comedians Will Ferrell and Jack Black also paid their farewell to the show in the series finale.

=== Conan O'Brien Needs a Friend and Conan O'Brien Must Go (2018–present) ===
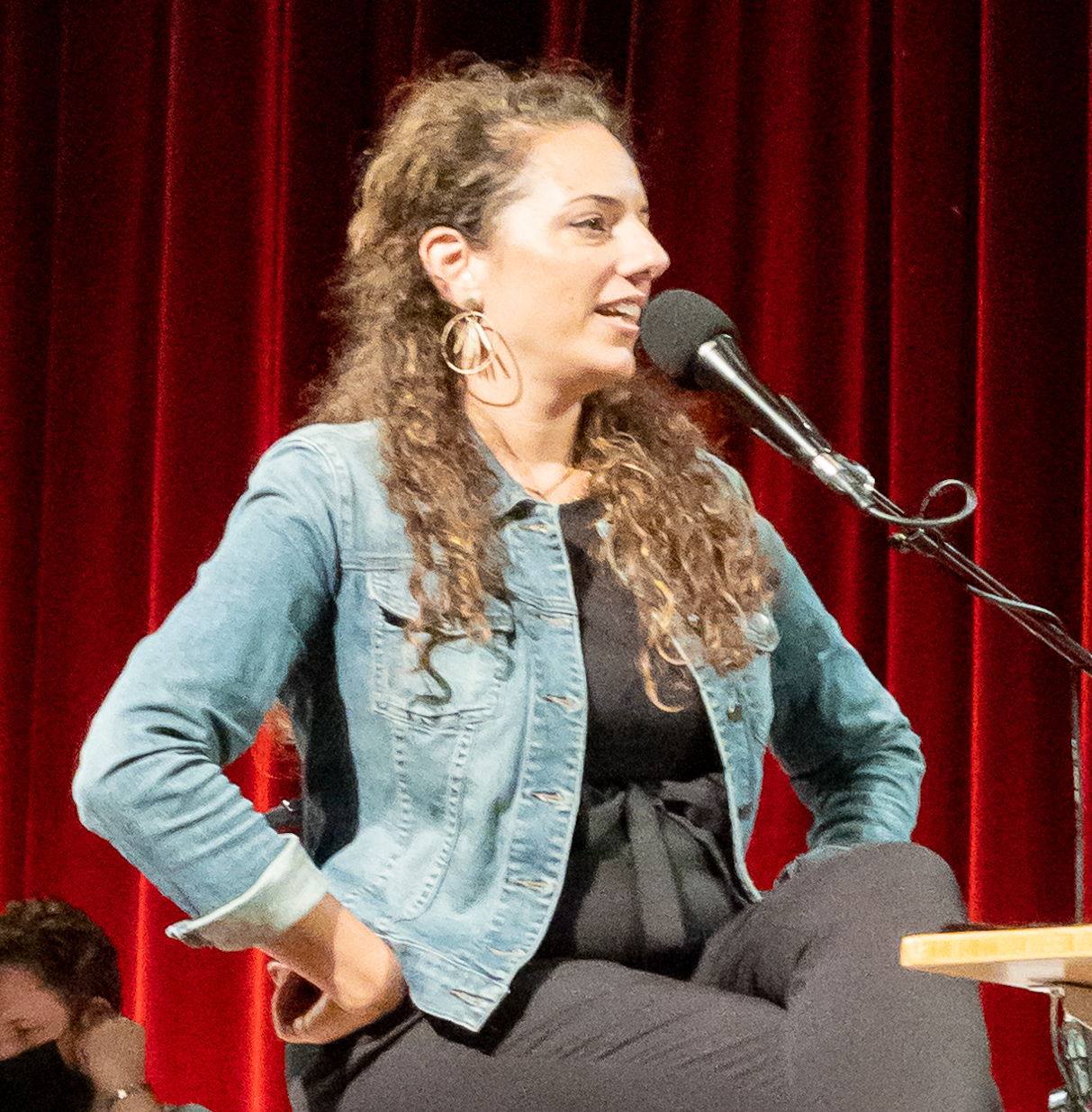
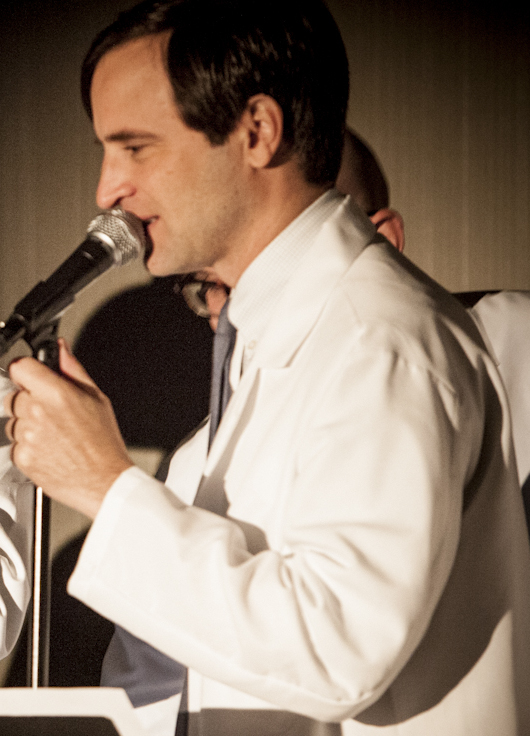
Sona Movsesian (left) and Matt Gourley (right) co-host Conan O'Brien Needs a Friend.

In 2018, O'Brien's production company, Team Coco, partnered with Earwolf to launch his own weekly podcast, Conan O'Brien Needs a Friend. The podcast debuted November 18, 2018, with Will Ferrell as the first guest. O'Brien stated the title is tongue-in-cheek, saying he would like to see if celebrity guests would actually be his friends. Each episode has the guest join O'Brien together with his co-hosts, his former assistant Sona Movsesian and the show's producer Matt Gourley. Guests on the podcast have included Barack and Michelle Obama, Stephen Colbert, and Bob Newhart. The podcast has received strong reviews and became the top podcast on iTunes. The podcast has also won numerous awards throughout its run. Deadline Hollywood reported that, as of August 2021, the podcast had been downloaded over 250 million times and was averaging more than 9 million downloads per month.

O'Brien made a cameo appearance as himself on the February 26, 2022 episode of Saturday Night Live, as a guest inducting John Mulaney into the Five-Timers Club with Tina Fey, Steve Martin, Paul Rudd, Candice Bergen and Elliott Gould.

In May 2022, O'Brien's podcast, as well as the entire Team Coco digital media business, was sold to SiriusXM for $150 million. (Note: Citing unnamed sources, The Wall Street Journal stated the deal was worth $150 million. The official terms of the deal were not made public.) This sale included all other Team Coco podcasts including Inside Conan and Parks and Recollection, as well as the development of a comedy channel for SiriusXM radio service.

On April 18, 2024, HBO released a four-episode international travel series titled Conan O'Brien Must Go on Max to widespread critical acclaim. The series featured O'Brien traveling to Norway, Argentina, Thailand, and Ireland to meet fans whom he had previously featured via video calls in his podcast series Conan O'Brien Needs a Fan. The show was renewed for a second season of six episodes in May 2024. To promote the first season's release, O'Brien appeared on the interview show Hot Ones, where guests eat increasingly spicy chicken wings. The intensity and humor of his episode received significant media attention, resulting in widespread praise of his performance and more generally as a comedic performer.

In January 2025, it was announced that O'Brien would be the 2025 recipient of the Mark Twain Prize for American Humor. He received the award on March 23 at the John F. Kennedy Center for the Performing Arts in Washington, D.C. The recording of the presentation later garnered him an Emmy in 2025 for Outstanding Variety Special (Pre-Recorded).

In May of 2026, he was awarded an honorary Doctor of Arts degree by his alma mater, Harvard University, at the institution's annual commencement ceremony, where he also gave the commencement speech.

In June 2026, has partnered with AI cybersecurity company Adaptive Security to create a 15-part training series that teaches employees how to recognize and respond to AI-powered cyber threats such as deepfakes, voice cloning, phishing attacks, impersonation scams, and physical security risks. The series, filmed in Los Angeles, combines humor with cybersecurity education. Scripts were co-written by O’Brien’s production company Team Coco and Adaptive Security, with O’Brien contributing his trademark improvisational style.

== Other work ==
=== Television production ===
O'Brien was executive producer and co-wrote the pilot of the 2007 NBC adventure/comedy series Andy Barker, P.I., starring O'Brien's sidekick Andy Richter. After six episodes and low ratings, the show was canceled despite being named one of the Top Ten Shows of 2007 by Entertainment Weekly. Later, USA Network ordered a pilot episode of the medical-themed Operating Instructions, which was produced by O'Brien's production company Conaco. In January 2010, NBC ordered two pilots from Conaco, the one-hour courtroom drama Outlaw and a half-hour comedy. Outlaw was produced in eight episodes and premiered on September 15, 2010.

=== Voice work ===
O'Brien's first guest appearance after beginning his late-night career was playing himself in the season five Simpsons episode "Bart Gets Famous", interviewing Bart Simpson during his rise to fame as a catchphrase comedian. In 1999, O'Brien made an appearance on Futurama in the second-season episode "Xmas Story". O'Brien played himself as a head in a jar and still alive in the year 3000. O'Brien has made multiple voice appearances on the Adult Swim series Robot Chicken, including the specials Robot Chicken: Star Wars and Robot Chicken: Star Wars Episode II.

Other voice work performed by O'Brien includes the voice of Robert Todd Lincoln in the audiobook version of Assassination Vacation by Sarah Vowell, the voice of talk show host Dave Endochrine in the 2013 DC Universe Animated Original Movie Batman: The Dark Knight Returns (Part 2), the voice of the character Kuchikukan in the "Operation: Lunacorn Apocalypse" episode of Nickelodeon's The Penguins of Madagascar, and the voice of Santa Claus in The Backyardigans episode "The Action Elves Save Christmas Eve". In 2026, O’Brien joined Disney’s Toy Story universe as Smarty Pants in the fifth installment of the film series.

=== Guest appearances ===
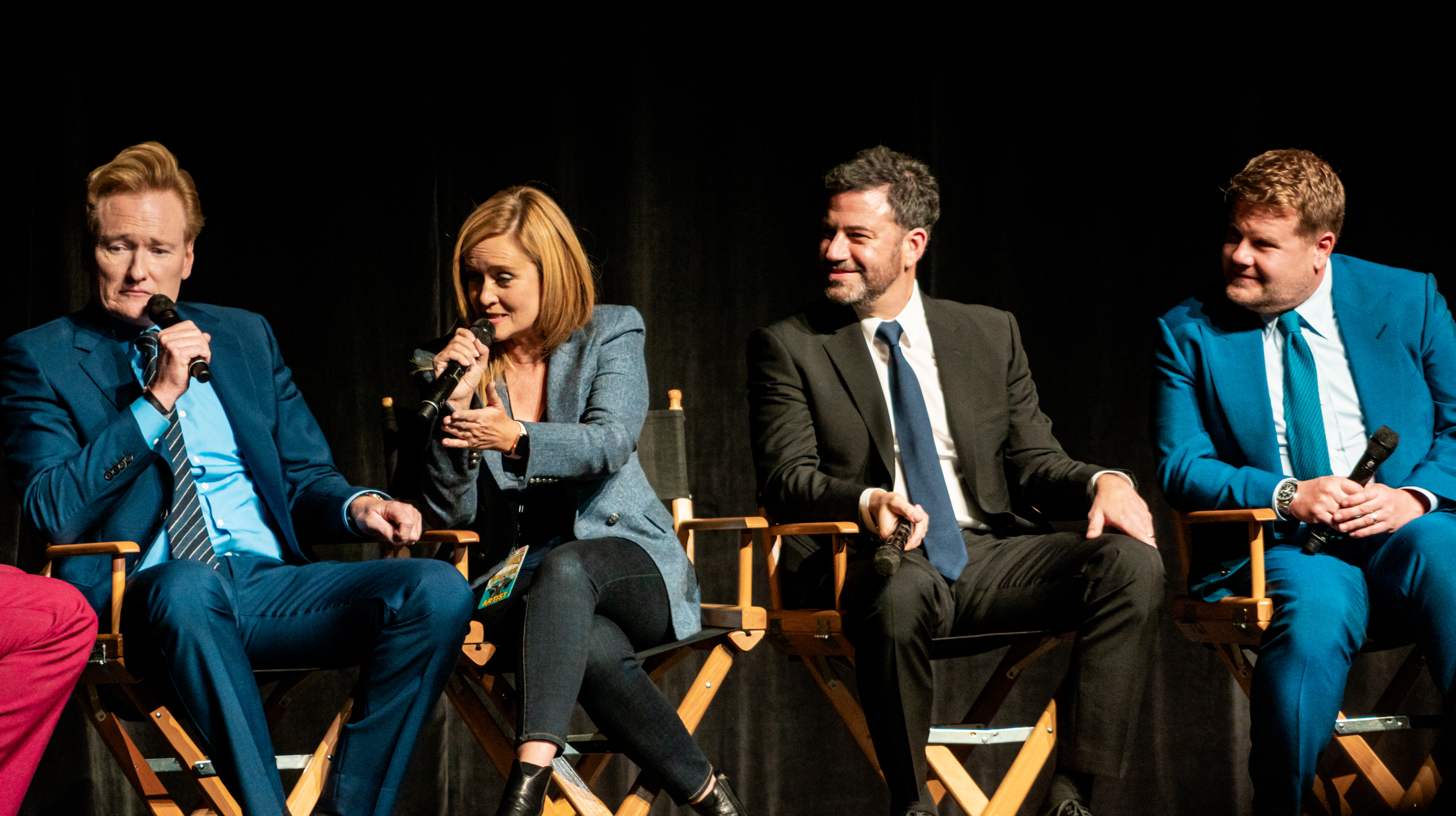
O'Brien with fellow late-night hosts Samantha Bee, Jimmy Kimmel, and James Corden in 2018

On the TV show 30 Rock, O'Brien is depicted as an ex-boyfriend of lead character Liz Lemon, who works in the same building. In the episode "Tracy Does Conan", O'Brien appears as himself, awkwardly reunited with Lemon and coerced by network executive Jack Donaghy into having the character Tracy Jordan on Late Night, despite having been assaulted in Jordan's previous appearance. O'Brien also made a cameo appearance on the American version of The Office. In the episode "Valentine's Day", Michael believes that he spots former SNL cast member Tina Fey but has actually mistaken another woman for her. In the meantime, O'Brien has a quick walk-on, and the camera crew informs Michael when he returns from talking to the Tina Fey lookalike. In 2011, he starred as himself in the web series Web Therapy (opposite Lisa Kudrow) for three episodes. O'Brien also made a guest appearance as the "Wandering MC" in the 2019 video game Death Stranding, where he communicates with the player using voice lines and facial expressions recorded during his visit to Kojima Productions' headquarters.

=== Hosting duties ===
O'Brien has hosted several awards shows and television specials. He hosted the 54th Primetime Emmy Awards in 2002 and the 58th Primetime Emmy Awards in 2006, to critical acclaim. He also hosted the 2014 MTV Movie Awards. In 2011 and 2012, O'Brien hosted the Christmas in Washington special for TBS' sister network, TNT, featuring celebrity performances and a special appearance by the Obama family both years.

He has served as the master of ceremonies for the White House Correspondents' Association dinner in Washington, D.C. twice, in 1995 and 2013. In 2016, O'Brien hosted the 5th NFL Honors in San Francisco, California. He also hosted a reunion special in Northern Ireland for Game of Thrones in 2018 for the final season of the series. The special was released on HBO Max in 2021.

On March 2, 2025, O'Brien hosted the 97th Academy Awards for the first time. He received wide acclaim for his performance, with the ceremony achieving its best U.S. television ratings in five years, and the Academy announced just two weeks later that he would return to host the 98th Academy Awards, which also received acclaim for his performance. O'Brien is set to return again as host in the 99th Academy Awards in 2027.

=== Actor ===
O'Brien played a fictional non-comedic live-action character for the first time in the 2025 American drama film If I Had Legs I'd Kick You written and directed by Mary Bronstein. In her review for The New York Times, Jeannette Catsoulis characterized O'Brian's character as "wickedly hostile."

=== Music ===
In 2026, O’Brien formed a rock band, named The Vigodas in honor of frequent Late Night collaborator Abe Vigoda. The group, in which O’Brien performs vocals and guitar, made its debut at a live show in Los Angeles on August 10.

== Influences and style ==
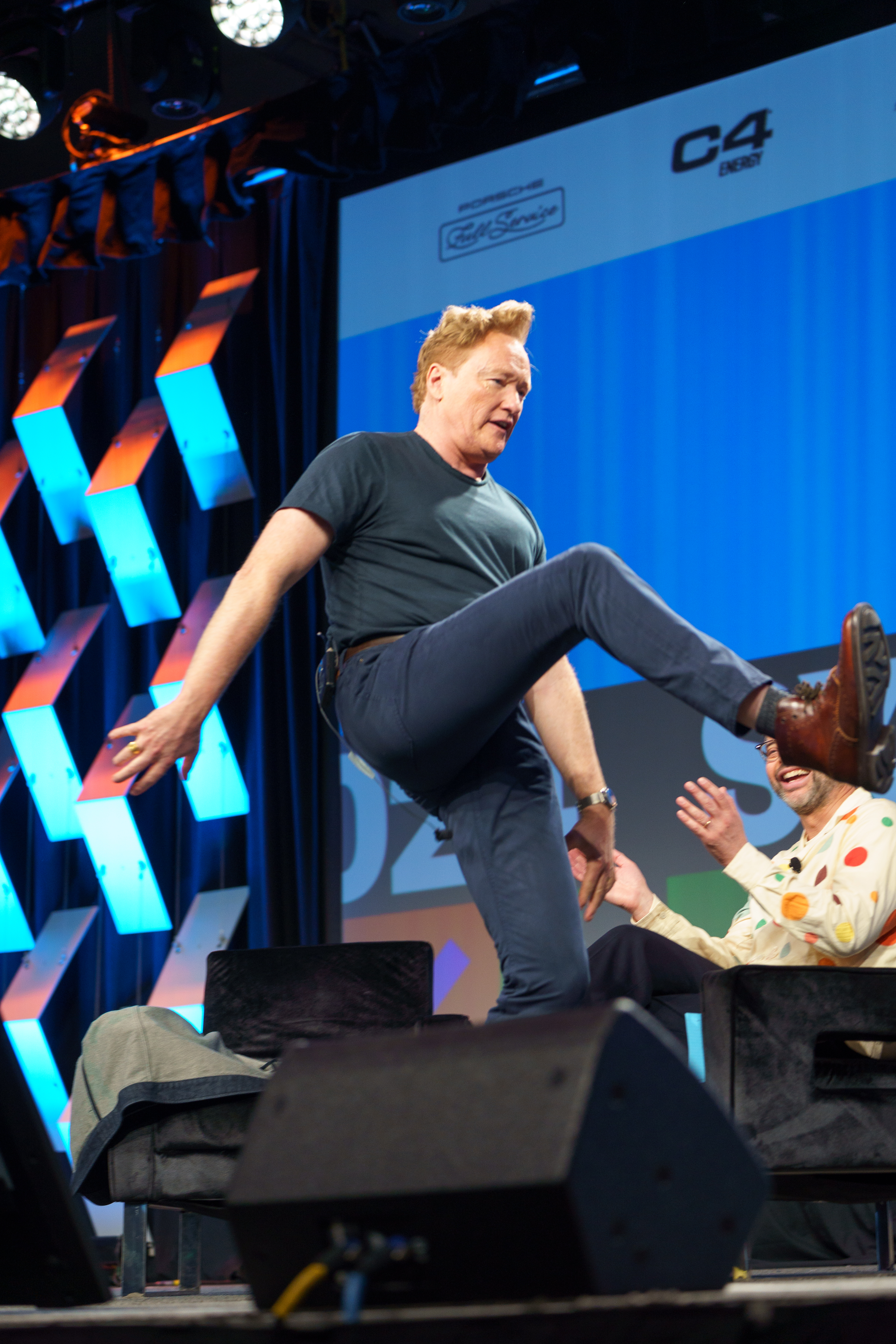
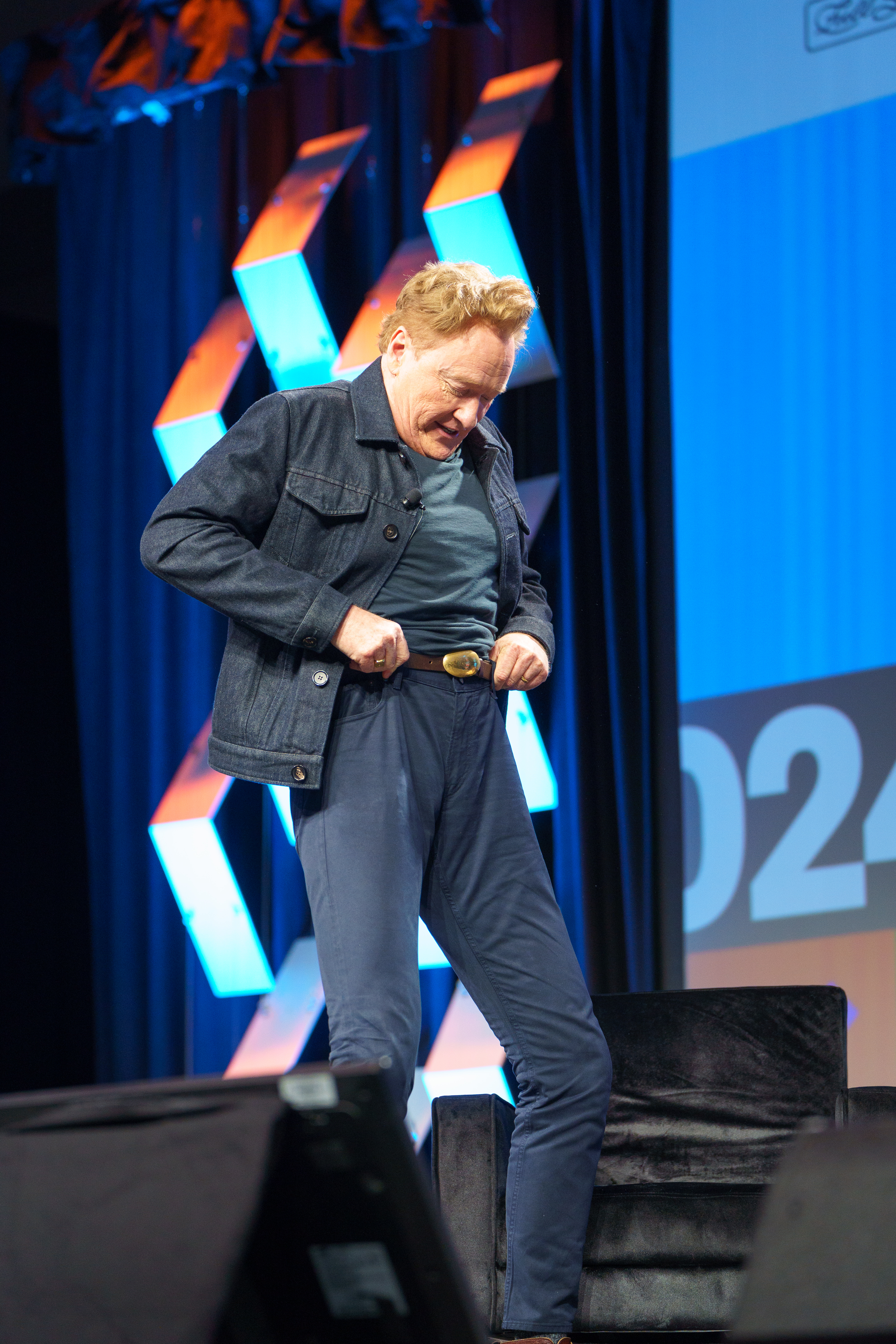
O'Brien demonstrating his long legs at SXSW in March 2024. He is known for his active, spontaneous, and self-deprecating humor.

On Late Night, O'Brien became known for his active and spontaneous hosting style, which has been characterized as "self-deprecating" by both media outlets and O'Brien himself. This spontaneity is also apparent in remotes in which he is put in novel and open-ended environments. Some of these, such as a "Civil War-era baseball" remote during Late Night and his international Conan Without Borders shows, are among his best-received work.

O'Brien lists among his comedic influences Carol Burnett, Bob Newhart, David Letterman, Peter Sellers, Sid Caesar, Warner Bros. Cartoons, Johnny Carson, Ernie Kovacs, Bob Hope, and Woody Allen; and upon his retirement from Conan, he described his style as the pursuit of a "strange, phantom intersection between smart and stupid". In turn, actors and comedians who claim O'Brien as an influence include Mindy Kaling, Pete Holmes, Seth Meyers, Nikki Glaser, John Krasinski, Moses Storm, Sam Richardson, Colin Jost, Kumail Nanjiani, Ron Funches, John Mulaney, Eric André, and Taylor Tomlinson. The military working dog Conan is reportedly named after O'Brien according to Newsweek.

== Personal life ==
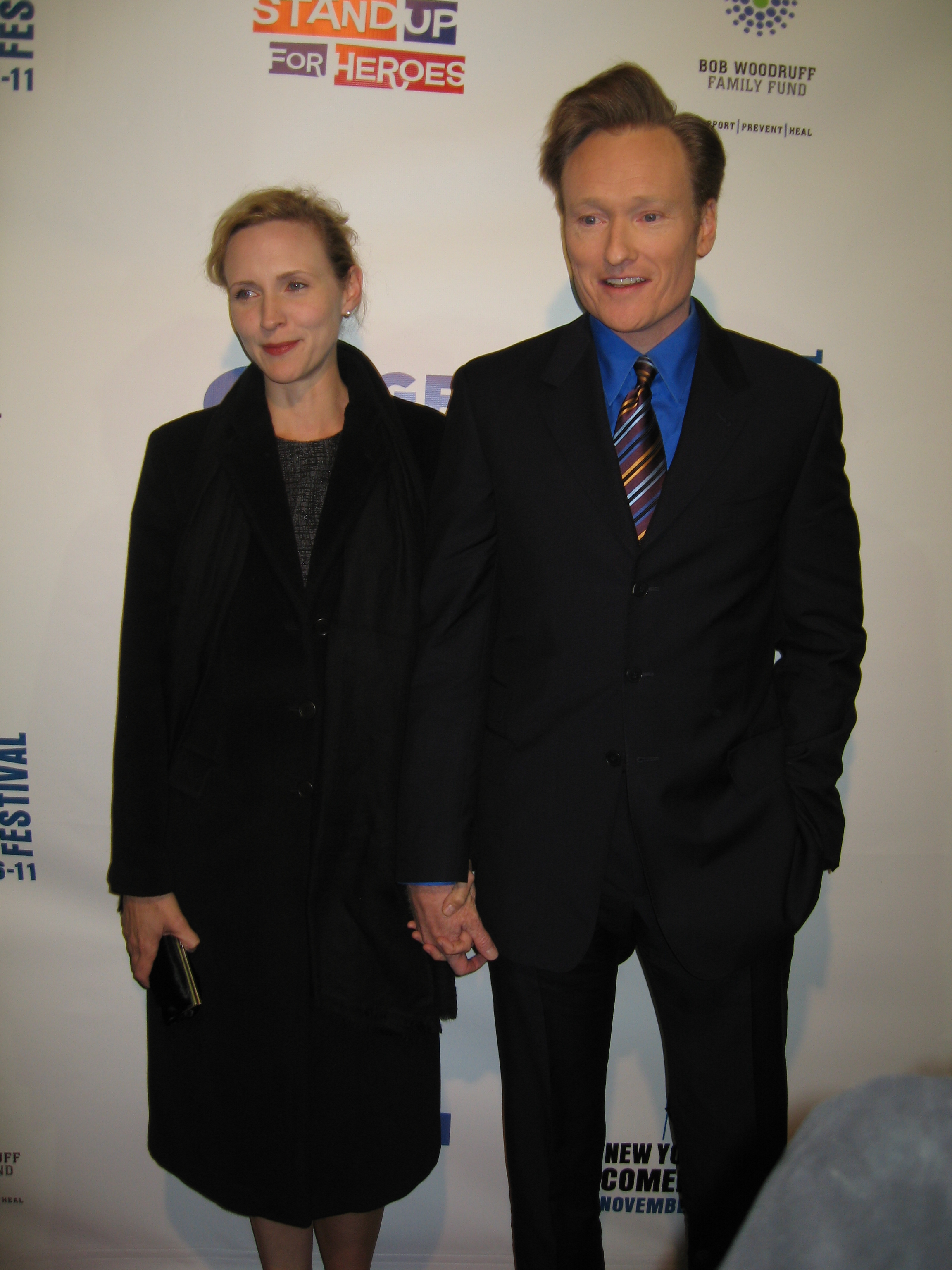
O'Brien with his wife Liza in 2007

O'Brien met Elizabeth Ann "Liza" Powel in 2000, when, as a senior copywriter for the advertising agency Foote, Cone & Belding, she appeared in a pre-taped sketch on Late Night with Conan O'Brien in which O'Brien sought to craft a more effective TV commercial for Hilton Furniture, a store in Houston, where his show aired in an undesirable timeslot of 2:40am. The couple dated for nearly 18 months before their 2002 marriage in Powel's hometown of Seattle. O'Brien and Powel have a daughter, Neve, and a son, Beckett (born 2005). O'Brien was included in People magazine's list of the nation's "100 Most Eligible Bachelors" for the year 2000. Before meeting Powel, O'Brien was in a relationship with Lynn Kaplan, talent booker for Late Night with Conan O'Brien. He briefly dated Lisa Kudrow before her Friends success.

O'Brien often speaks about his Irish Catholic heritage. On a 2009 episode of Inside the Actors Studio, he stated that ancestors from both sides of his family moved to America from Ireland starting in the 1850s, subsequently marrying only other Irish Catholics, and that his lineage is thus 100% Irish Catholic. His entirely homogenous ancestry was confirmed via DNA test a decade later, which he shared on The Late Show with Stephen Colbert. O'Brien noted that being entirely descended from just one ethnic group is extremely rare for an American, and that his being so "shocked" his doctor.

He has been a registered Democrat since casting his first vote for president in 1984 for Walter Mondale. He considers himself a moderate on the political spectrum. O'Brien founded the anti-hunger organization Labels Are For Jars with his friend and former Harvard dormmate Father Paul B. O'Brien. He also helped open the Cor Unum meal center in Lawrence, Massachusetts in 2006.

Starting in September 2006, O'Brien was stalked by Father David Ajemian of the Archdiocese of Boston, who, despite multiple warnings to stop, sent O'Brien letters signed as "your priest stalker". Ajemian later sent O'Brien death threats and tried to forcefully enter a taping of Late Night before being arrested. On April 8, 2008, Ajemian pleaded guilty to stalking, and was later laicized. As part of the plea deal, Ajemian volunteered a restraining order to stay away from O'Brien for two years. As of November 2010, no further harassment of O'Brien has been reported.

In January 2008, after his show was put on hold for two months owing to the strike by the Writers Guild of America, he reemerged on late-night TV sporting a beard, which guest Tom Brokaw described as making him look like "a draft dodger from the Civil War." After leaving The Tonight Show with Conan O'Brien in 2010, O'Brien again grew a beard, which he kept until May 2011, when it was partially shaved on the set of Conan by Will Ferrell (and completely shaved off-screen by a professional barber).

O'Brien purchased a $10.5-million mansion in Brentwood, Los Angeles, California, to prepare for his move there in 2009 from New York City to host The Tonight Show at Universal Studios Hollywood. As part of a long-running gag, he brought his 1992 Ford Taurus SHO with him to California, showcasing it on both the inaugural episodes of The Tonight Show and Conan. O'Brien purchased an ocean-front house in Carpinteria, California in 2016. He listed the Carpinteria house for sale for $16.5 million in July 2022.

On June 12, 2011, O'Brien was awarded an honorary Doctor of Arts degree from Dartmouth College. In addition to the honorary degree, he delivered the commencement speech. On October 21, 2011, O'Brien was ordained as a minister by the Universal Life Church Monastery, allowing him to perform a same-sex marriage in New York, at that time one of the few states in the US where gay marriage was legal. The wedding, between a member of O'Brien's staff and his partner, was held on the stage of the Beacon Theatre on November 3, 2011, and broadcast on Conan. The same-sex marriage ceremony was the first to be broadcast on American late night television.

In 2015, O’Brien visited the Armenian Genocide Memorial in Yerevan alongside his assistant of Armenian descent, Sona Movsesian, as part of his visit to Armenia in Conan Without Borders in order to spread awareness about the genocide.

The 2025 Palisades fire burned up to the property line of O'Brien's Brentwood mansion, damaging trees and vegetation in the yard, but sparing the house as what CNN characterized as "one of lucky few" Pacific Palisades properties to be still standing, while associates such as writer and producer Frank Smiley and assistant and co-host Sona Movsesian lost theirs to the various fires.

== Filmography ==
=== Film ===
Conan O'Brien film appearances
Year	Film	Role	Notes	Ref.
1998	Tomorrow Night	Himself	Cameo	
2001	Pootie Tang	Himself	Uncredited cameo	
2001	Vanilla Sky	Himself	Cameo	
2001	Storytelling	Himself		
2002	The Rutles 2: Can't Buy Me Lunch	Himself	TV film	
2005	Bewitched	Himself		
2006	Queer Duck: The Movie	Himself	Voice	
2006	Pittsburgh	Himself		
2008	The Great Buck Howard	Himself		
2011	Conan O'Brien Can't Stop	Himself	Documentary	
2013	Batman: The Dark Knight Returns Part 2	David Endocrine	Voice	
2013	Now You See Me	Himself		
2013	The Secret Life of Walter Mitty	Himself		
2015	Being Canadian	Himself	Documentary	
2017	The Lego Batman Movie	The Riddler	Voice	
2017	Sandy Wexler	Himself		
2019	Dads	Himself	Documentary	
2021	The Mitchells vs. the Machines	Glaxxon 5000	Voice	
2022	Norm Macdonald: Nothing Special	Himself	Stand-up special	
2022	Weird: The Al Yankovic Story	Andy Warhol		
2023	Please Don't Destroy: The Treasure of Foggy Mountain	Farley		
2025	If I Had Legs I'd Kick You	Linda's therapist		
2025	John Candy: I Like Me	Himself	Documentary	
2026	Toy Story 5	Smarty Pants	Voice	
2026	Lorne	Himself	Documentary	

=== Television ===
Conan O'Brien television appearances
Year	Series	Role	Notes	Ref.
1985–1987	Not Necessarily the News	none	13 episodes; writer	
1987–1988	The Wilton North Report	none	13 episodes; writer	
1988–1991	Saturday Night Live	Various characters	Also writer (72 episodes); Appeared in 21 episodes	
1991	Lookwell	none	Pilot; creator and writer	
1992–1994; 2024	The Simpsons	Himself	Also writer (4 episodes) and producer (29 episodes); Voice; appeared in episodes: "Bart Gets Famous" and "Bart's Birthday"	
1993–2009	Late Night with Conan O'Brien	Himself (host)	2,277 episodes; also writer and producer	
1995	Mr. Show with Bob and David	Himself	Episode: "The Cry of a Hungry Baby"	
1996	The Single Guy	Cameron Duncan	Episode: "Rival"	
1996	Arli$$	Himself	Episode: "Colors of the Rainbow"	
1997–2002	Dr. Katz, Professional Therapist	Himself	Voice, 2 episodes	
1998	Veronica's Closet	Himself	Episode: "Veronica's Night Alone"	
1998	Spin City	Himself	Episode: "Dead Dog Talking"	
1999	LateLine	Himself	Episode: "Pearce on Conan"	
1999	Space Ghost Coast to Coast	Himself	Episode: "Fire Ant"	
1999	Futurama	Himself	Voice, episode: "Xmas Story"	
2000	DAG	Himself	Episode: "Pilot"	
2001	Saturday Night Live	Himself (host)	Episode: "Conan O'Brien/Don Henley"	
2002	54th Primetime Emmy Awards	Himself (host)	Television special	
2003	Andy Richter Controls the Universe	Freddy Pickering	Episode: "Crazy in Rio"	
2005–2008	Robot Chicken	Various voices	4 episodes	
2006	O'Grady	Chip	Voice, episode: "Frenched"	
2006	The Office	Himself	Episode: "Valentine's Day"	
2006	58th Primetime Emmy Awards	Himself (host)	Television special	
2006, 2013	30 Rock	Himself	2 episodes	
2007	Andy Barker, P.I.	none	Creator, writer and executive producer	
2009–2010	The Tonight Show with Conan O'Brien	Himself (host)	145 episodes; also writer and executive producer	
2009	The Backyardigans	Santa Claus	Voice, episode: "The Action Elves Save Christmas Eve"	
2010	Outlaw	none	Executive producer	
2010–2021	Conan	Himself (host)	1,510 episodes; also creator, writer and executive producer	
2011–2014	Eagleheart	Himself	Also executive producer Appeared in episode: "Honor Thy Marshal"	
2012	Web Therapy	Himself	3 episodes	
2012	How I Met Your Mother	Bar Patron	Uncredited; Episode: "No Pressure"	
2013	Newsreaders	Himself	Episode: "Jr. Newsreaders"	
2013	Deon Cole's Black Box	Himself	Also executive producer Appeared in Episode: "Deon Tries to Reach Out to White People"	
2013	Clear History	Himself	Television film	
2013	White House Correspondents' Dinner	Himself (host)	Television special	
2013	Arrested Development	Himself	Episode: "The B. Team"	
2013	Nashville	Himself	Episode: "Never No More"	
2013	It's Always Sunny in Philadelphia	Himself	Voice, episode: "The Gang Broke Dee"	
2013	Real Husbands of Hollywood	Himself	Episode: "Rock, Paper, Stealers"	
2013	Brody Stevens: Enjoy It!	Himself	Episode: "Conan!"	
2013–2014	Super Fun Night	none	Executive producer	
2013–2014	The Pete Holmes Show	none	Executive producer	
2013	Family Guy	Himself	Voice, episode: "Into Harmony's Way"	
2014	2014 MTV Movie Awards	Himself (host)	Television special	
2014	Maron	Himself	Episode: "The Joke"	
2014	Video Game High School	Newsanchor	Episode: "OMGWTFPS!?"	
2014	The Comeback	Himself	Episode: "Valerie Gets What She Wants"	
2014	Sharktopus vs. Pteracuda	Himself	Television film	
2015	The Jack and Triumph Show	none	Executive producer	
2015	Ground Floor	Himself	Episode: "The Mansfield Who Came to Dinner"	
2015	Stranger's Soul (Ուրիշի հոգին)	Mob boss	2 episodes	
2015	Clipped	Red-Head Customer	Episode: "Dreamers"	
2015	ArmComedy	Himself	1 episode	
2015	The Penguins of Madagascar	Kuchikukan	Voice, episode: "Operation: Lunacorn Apocalypse"	
2016	5th NFL Honors	Himself (host)	Television special	
2016	One More Happy Ending (한번 더 해피엔딩)	Himself	1 episode	
2016–2017	People of Earth	none	Executive producer	
2016	Gute Zeiten, schlechte Zeiten	Johnny J. Smith	1 episode	
2017	Mi adorable maldición	Joseph Robinson	Episode: "La fiesta de Apolonia"	
2018–2021	Final Space	Clarence	Voice; also executive producer	
2018	Un Posto al Sole	Man on computer	1 episode	
2018	Kidding	Himself	Episode: "Green Means Go"	
2019	Silicon Valley	Himself	Episode: "Exit Event"	
2022	Murderville	Himself	Episode: "The Magician's Assistant"	
2022	Saturday Night Live	Himself	Episode: "John Mulaney/LCD Soundsystem"	
2024	Curb Your Enthusiasm	Himself	Episode: "The Colostomy Bag"	
2024	Ros na Rún	Fear na mBalún (Balloon Man)	1 episode	
2024	Shortland Street	Dr. Aiden Archer	1 episode	
2024–present	Conan O'Brien Must Go	Himself (host)	7 episodes; also creator and executive producer	
2025	97th Academy Awards	Himself (host)	Television special	
2025	Conan O'Brien: The Mark Twain Prize for American Humor	Himself	Television special	
2025	Sanggang-Dikit FR	The Lunatic Foreigner	1 episode	
2026	98th Academy Awards	Himself (host)	Television special	

=== Video games ===
Conan O'Brien video game appearances
Year	Video game	Voice role	Ref.
2012	Halo 4	Soldier # 1	
2014	Lego Batman 3: Beyond Gotham	Himself	
2019	Death Stranding	The Wandering MC	

=== Music videos ===
Conan O'Brien music video appearances
Year	Title	Artist	Ref.
2005	"The Denial Twist"	The White Stripes	
2016	"Fire"	Park Jin-young (feat. Conan O'Brien, Steven Yeun & Jimin Park)	
2019	"For Love"	Kuami Eugene (feat. Conan O'Brien)	
2024	"Mister Los Angeles"	Dawes	

== Sources ==
=== Further reading ===
- Carter, Bill (November 4, 2010). The War for Late Night: When Leno Went Early and Television Went Crazy. New York City: Viking. ISBN 978-0-670-02208-3.
- Murthi, Vikram (May 13, 2024). "Conan O'Brien Keeps It Old-School". The Atlantic.
- O'Connell, Mikey (March 9, 2026). "Conan O'Brien Just Can't Help Himself". The Hollywood Reporter.

Media offices
Preceded by Jay Leno	Host of The Tonight Show; June 1, 2009 – January 22, 2010	Succeeded by Jay Leno
Preceded by David Letterman	Host of Late Night; September 13, 1993 – February 20, 2009	Succeeded by Jimmy Fallon
Preceded by Ellen DeGeneres	Host of Christmas in Washington; 2011, 2012	Succeeded by Hugh Jackman
