= ArmComedy =

- Presented by: Sergey Sargsyan; Narek Margaryan
- Country of origin: Armenia
- No. of episodes: 1172

Production
- Running time: ~25 minutes

Original release
- Network: Armnews; ATV
- Release: March 10, 2012 – 2016

ArmComedy is an Armenian comedy show first aired in March 2012. It is aired thrice a week on ATV channel. Originally started as a satirical news website, it later evolved into a web series on the CivilNet Internet TV channel. After two years, the creators of the show were invited to expand to network television. ArmComedy became the "first satiric news show in Armenia dripped in political humor and wit, reporting the real news with a different perspective". Every episode of ArmComedy is written and hosted by Armenian comedians Narek Margaryan and Sergey Sargsyan. It has been dubbed in press as "Armenia's version of The Daily Show".

In October 2015, Conan O'Brien was guest on ArmComedy during his trip to Armenia. He planned to invite the hosts on his show if they ever visited America. In May 2017, Narek Margaryan and Sergey Sargsyan were on US standup tour and were invited as guests on Conan. During their tour Sergey and Narek were awarded the keys to the city of Glendale, California.

In 2021 the show announced that they are leaving television and will return to YouTube where it originally started.

Notable guests

- Conan O'Brien, American comedian
- Serzh Sargsyan, former President of Armenia (2008-2018)
- Garik Martirosyan, Comedian, TV host, actor
- Ken Davitian, American actor
- Armen Ashotyan, former Minister of Education and Science of Armenia
- Batman, fictional
- Nikol Pashinyan, politician, current Prime Minister of Armenia
- Paruyr Hayrikyan, politician
- Raffi Hovannisian, politician
- Levon Oganezov, Russian filmmaker of Armenian origin
- Gor Sujyan, singer
- Arto Tunçboyacıyan, singer
- Mkrtich Arzumanyan, actor
- Aram MP3, singer
- Nazeni Hovhannisyan, actress
- Iveta Mukuchyan, singer-songwriter
