= The Legally Prohibited from Being Funny on Television Tour =

Comedy tour by Conan O'Brien in 2010

Legally Prohibited from Being Funny on Television Tour
- Comedy tour by Conan O'Brien
- Official tour poster, based on Mike Mitchell's "I'm with Coco" poster
- Start date: April 12, 2010
- End date: June 14, 2010
- No. of shows: 43 in North America

The Legally Prohibited from Being Funny on Television Tour, also known as the Prohibited Tour, was a comedy tour by American comedian and talk show host Conan O'Brien. Its title is a reference to the 2010 Tonight Show host and timeslot conflict, which resulted in O'Brien resigning from his position as host of The Tonight Show in January 2010. O'Brien reached a settlement with NBC that barred him from appearing on television until September 2010, but it did not bar him from performing before a live audience in a concert setting. From April through June 2010, O'Brien performed 43 shows in the United States and Canada.

O'Brien announced on March 11, 2010, via his Twitter account that he would embark on a 30-city live tour beginning April 12. Even with the unconventional marketing campaign of a single Twitter announcement, many locations sold out within hours of the tweet and additional shows were added on to meet demand. During the tour, O'Brien announced that his new show, Conan, would debut on TBS in November 2010. A documentary following O'Brien during the tour, Conan O'Brien Can't Stop, was released in June 2011.

== Background and announcement ==
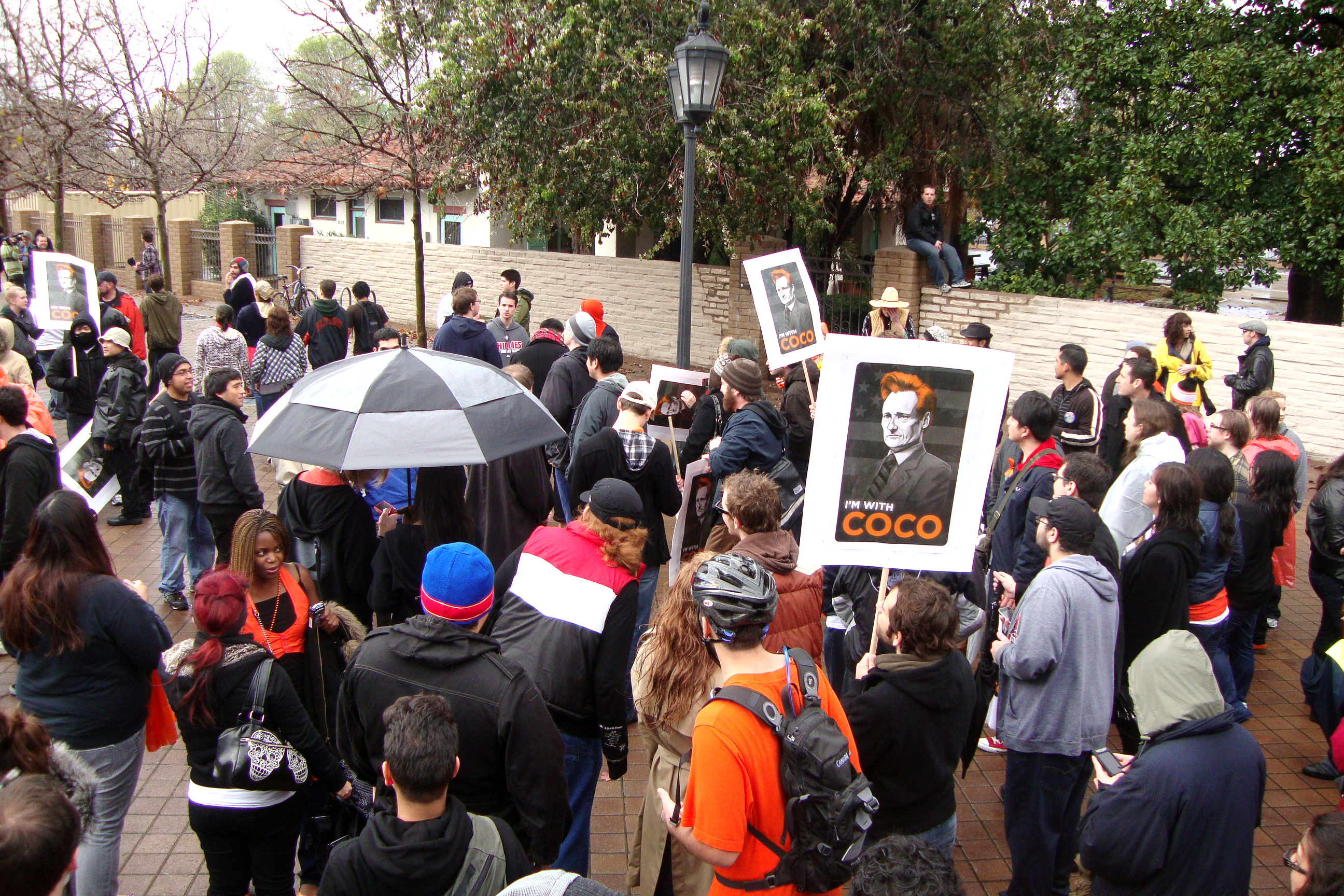
O'Brien's supporters rally outside Universal Studios in Los Angeles

In January 2010, late-night talk show hosts Conan O'Brien and Jay Leno engaged in a public relations conflict over who should host The Tonight Show. Due to low ratings for The Jay Leno Show and The Tonight Show with Conan O'Brien, NBC announced a schedule change, moving Leno from 10:00 pm to 11:30 pm, and O'Brien from 11:30 pm to 12:05 am. This change resulted in a public outcry and public demonstrations largely in support of O'Brien. O'Brien indicated that he would quit his show and leave the network if NBC were to implement it, citing the "destruction" of the venerable franchise which had aired at or around 11:30 pm for over 60 years.

As part of the deal between O'Brien and NBC, O'Brien was legally prohibited from appearing on television prior to September 1, 2010. He began to utilize social media to remain engaged with his fan base. O'Brien started a Twitter account on February 24, 2010. After about one hour, O'Brien's subscriber list had reached over 30,000 members and, approximately 30 minutes later, he was on the brink of passing 50,000 followers. After 24 hours, O'Brien had well over 300,000 followers. In late May 2010, he surpassed the one million mark for number of Twitter followers.

On March 11, 2010, O'Brien announced via his Twitter account that he would embark on a 30-city live tour, beginning on April 12, 2010. On the same day, teamcoco.com, an official website, was launched. According to TMZ, O'Brien decided not to keep any of the proceeds from the tour, in order to employ his show's staff members.

== Format ==
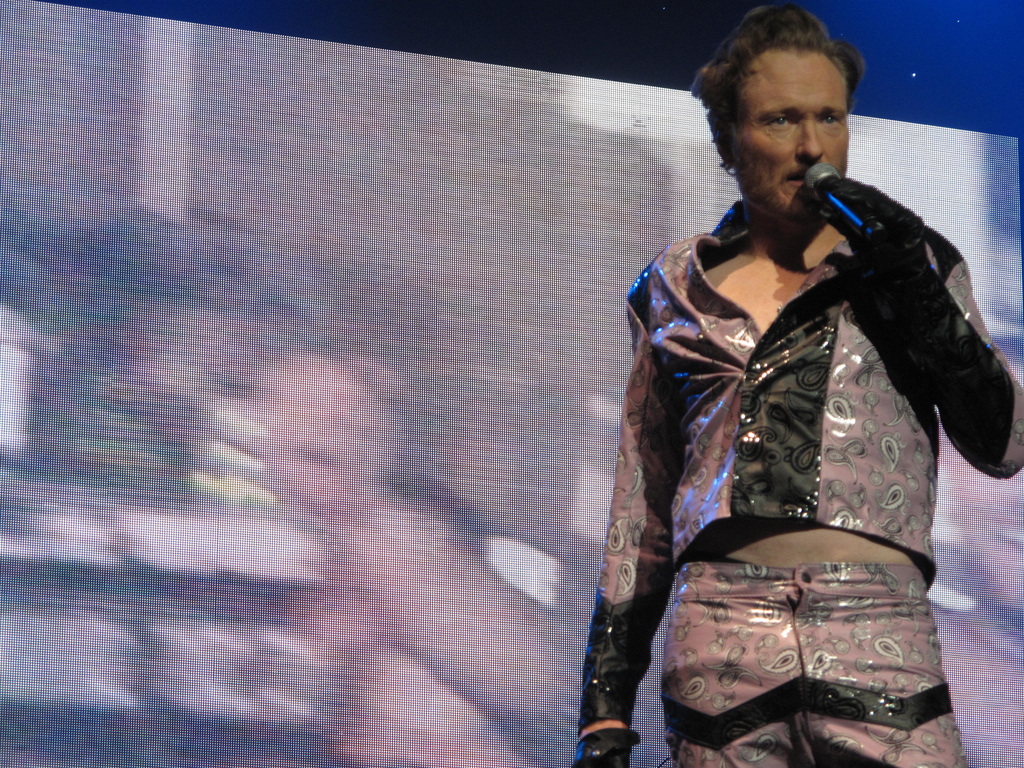
O'Brien performing in a replica of the costume Eddie Murphy wore in Eddie Murphy Raw.

Several members of O'Brien's staff joined him for the tour, including sidekick Andy Richter, and the former Tonight Show Band, temporarily renamed "The Legally Prohibited Band". Max Weinberg, the band leader, was unable to participate in the tour due to his recent heart surgery, although he did appear at one of the New York City shows.

Signs at each venue encouraged audience members using Twitter during the show to use a unique hashtag. Reggie Watts served as the tour's opening act. In the video introduction to the show, Conan appeared as an obese and bearded version of himself struggling to cope with the loss of his talk show while Eric Carmen's "All By Myself" plays. He then transforms back into his thin self during his exercise montage (by merely pulling off his body suit) after getting the call to go on tour.

The tour differed from his television shows in that there was no desk or celebrity interviews, but presented as more of a variety show than a stand-up routine. Many elements from TV were incorporated into the show, including video bits, musical and comic performers, and cameo appearances by celebrities. Classic sketches were also revived for the tour, albeit under different names due to legal issues over the ownership rights. The Masturbating Bear, for example, made a brief appearance before being transformed into the Self-Pleasuring Panda. Also, the "Walker, Texas Ranger lever" was retitled the "Chuck Norris Rural Policeman Handle". Triumph the Insult Comic Dog mocked the city the tour was appearing in as himself in a prerecorded bit that inserts information about the city by dubbing over the original audio. O'Brien also introduced a giant inflatable bat he claimed to have purchased during Meat Loaf's Bat Out of Hell tour and at one point walked onstage wearing a replica of Eddie Murphy's purple suit from his comedy special Eddie Murphy Raw. In addition, O'Brien performed music throughout the show, including the disco hit "I Will Survive" and a personal parody of "On the Road Again".

== Opening act ==
- Reggie Watts (select dates)

== Special guests ==
- Spoon (Eugene)
- Jack McBrayer (Eugene, Los Angeles, Atlanta)
- Seth Rogen (Vancouver—April 14)
- Dave Matthews (Seattle—April 18)
- Eddie Vedder (Seattle—April 19)
- Mike McCready (Seattle—April 19)
- Chris Isaak (San Francisco)
- Jim Carrey (Los Angeles)
- Aziz Ansari (Los Angeles)
- Jonah Hill (Los Angeles)
- Jon Hamm (Los Angeles—April 24)
- Seth Green (Los Angeles—April 25)
- Sarah Silverman (Los Angeles—April 25)
- Jason Mraz (San Diego)
- Mike Tyson (Las Vegas—May 2)
- The Fray (Denver)
- Jimmie Vaughan (Dallas)
- Dirk Nowitzki (Dallas)
- Charlie Sexton (Austin)
- Hanson (Tulsa)
- Jason Sudeikis (Kansas City)
- Brian Setzer (Minneapolis)
- Brian Urlacher (Chicago—May 19)
- John C. Reilly (Chicago—May 19)
- Lil' Ed Williams (Chicago—May 20)
- Tim Meadows (Chicago—May 20)
- Sarah Killen (East Lansing)
- Kid Rock (East Lansing)
- John Krasinski (New York City)
- Stephen Colbert (New York City—June 1)
- Jon Stewart (New York City—June 1)
- Paul Rudd (New York City—June 1)
- Bill Hader (New York City—June 1)
- Vampire Weekend (New York City—June 1)
- Max Weinberg (New York City—June 2)
- Pee-wee Herman (New York City—June 2)
- Eli Manning (New York City—June 2)
- Dropkick Murphys (Boston)
- Ed Helms (Boston—June 4)
- Tina Fey (Upper Darby)
- Trey Anastasio (Upper Darby)
- Jack White (Nashville)
- Evander Holyfield (Atlanta)

== Tour dates ==
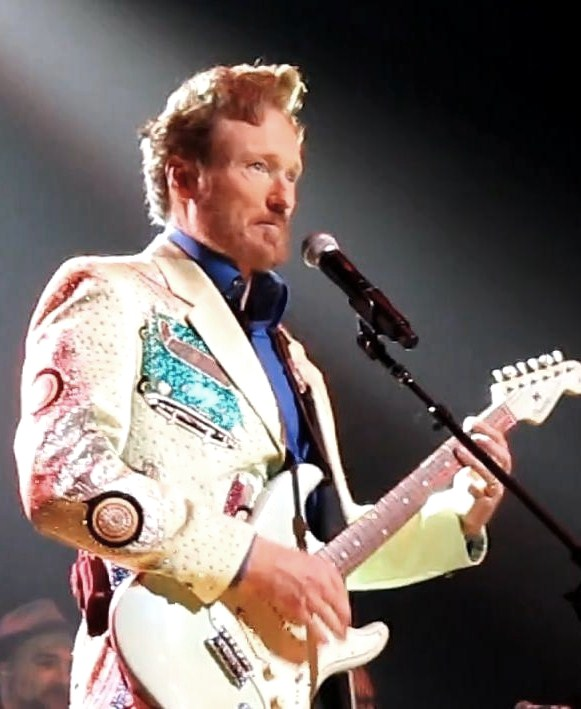
O'Brien performing a cover of "I Will Survive" on his first day of the tour in Eugene, Oregon.

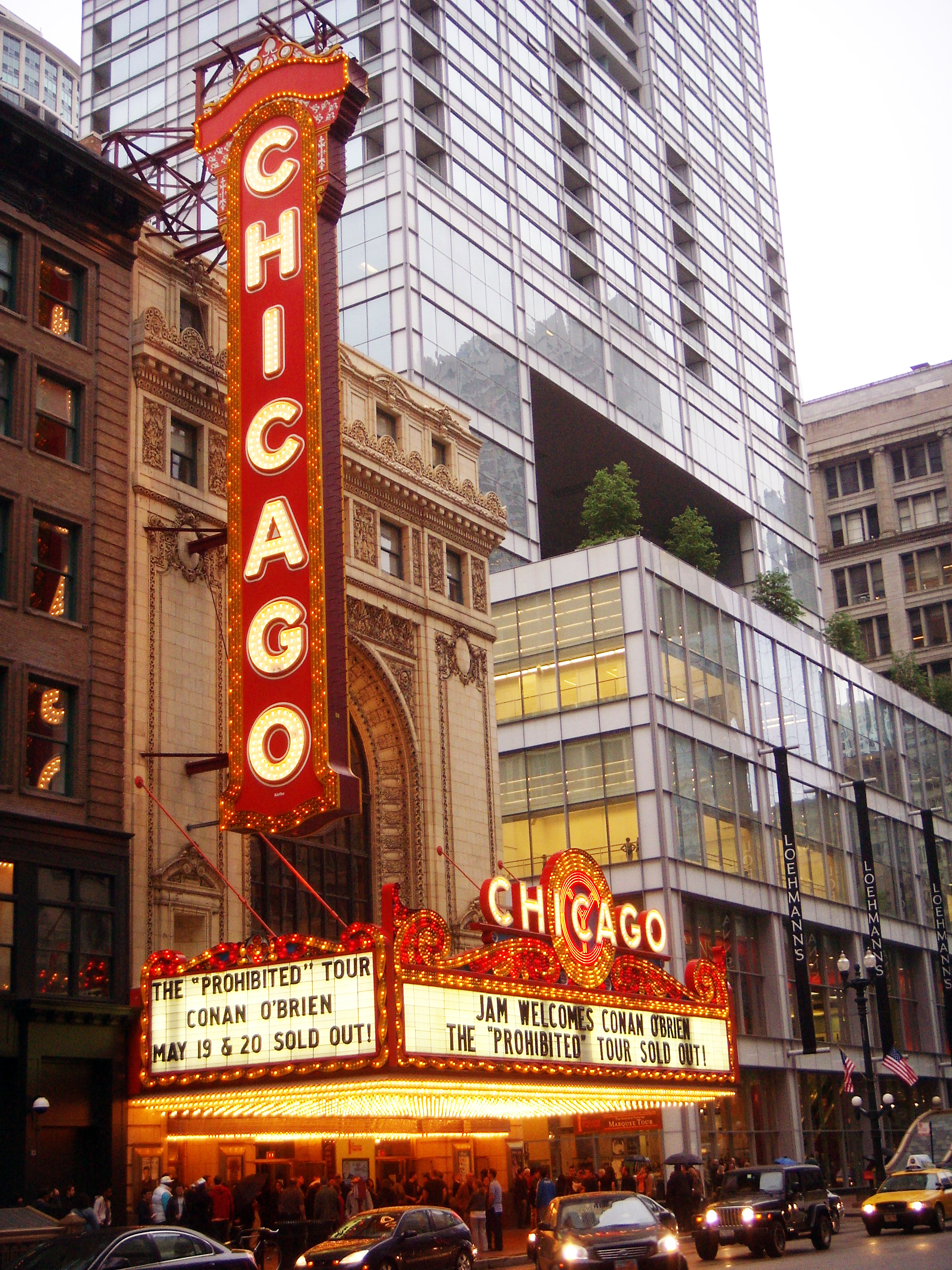
Marquee at the Chicago Theatre

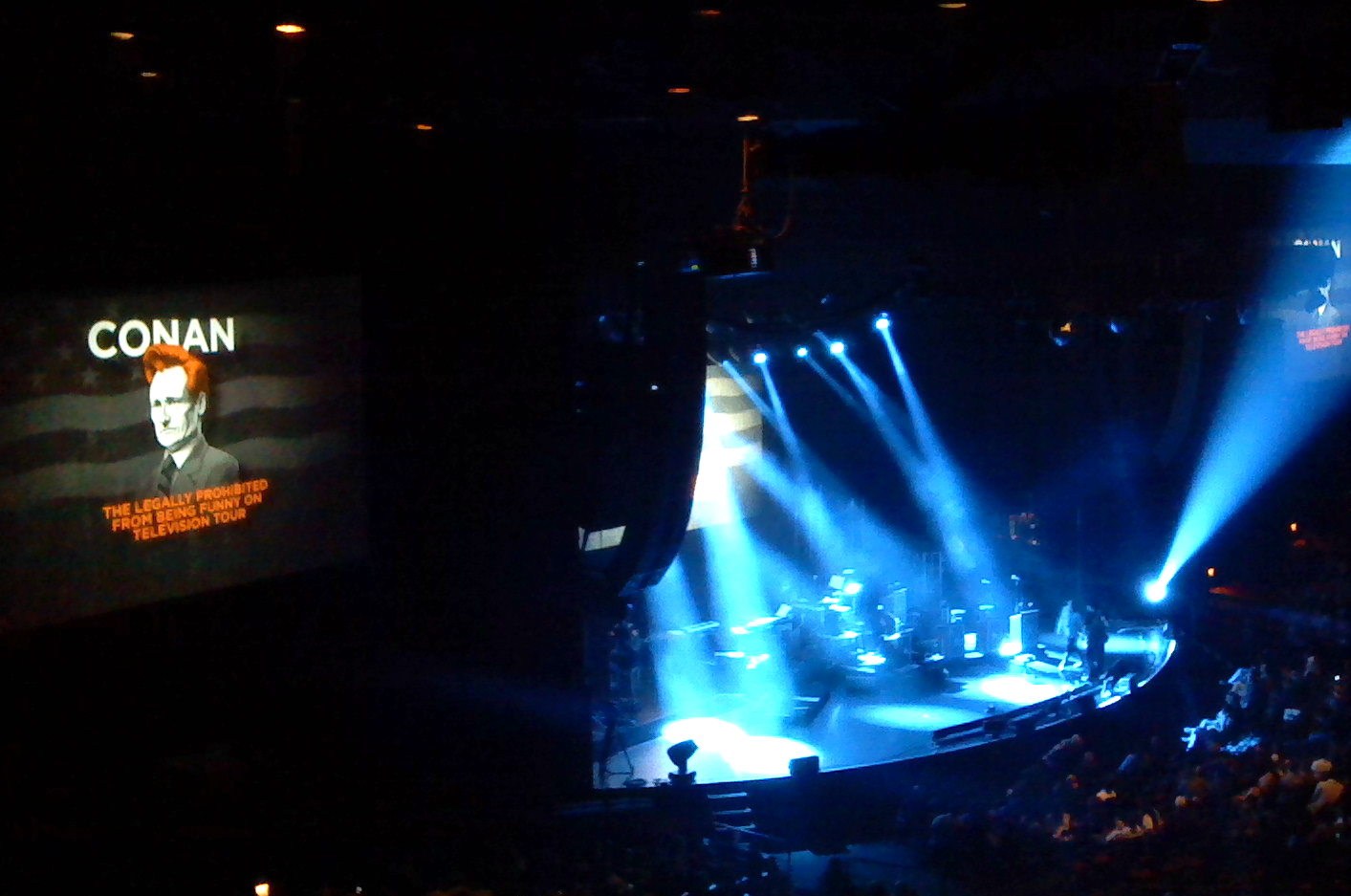
Stage from the show of April 24 at Gibson Amphitheatre in Universal City, California

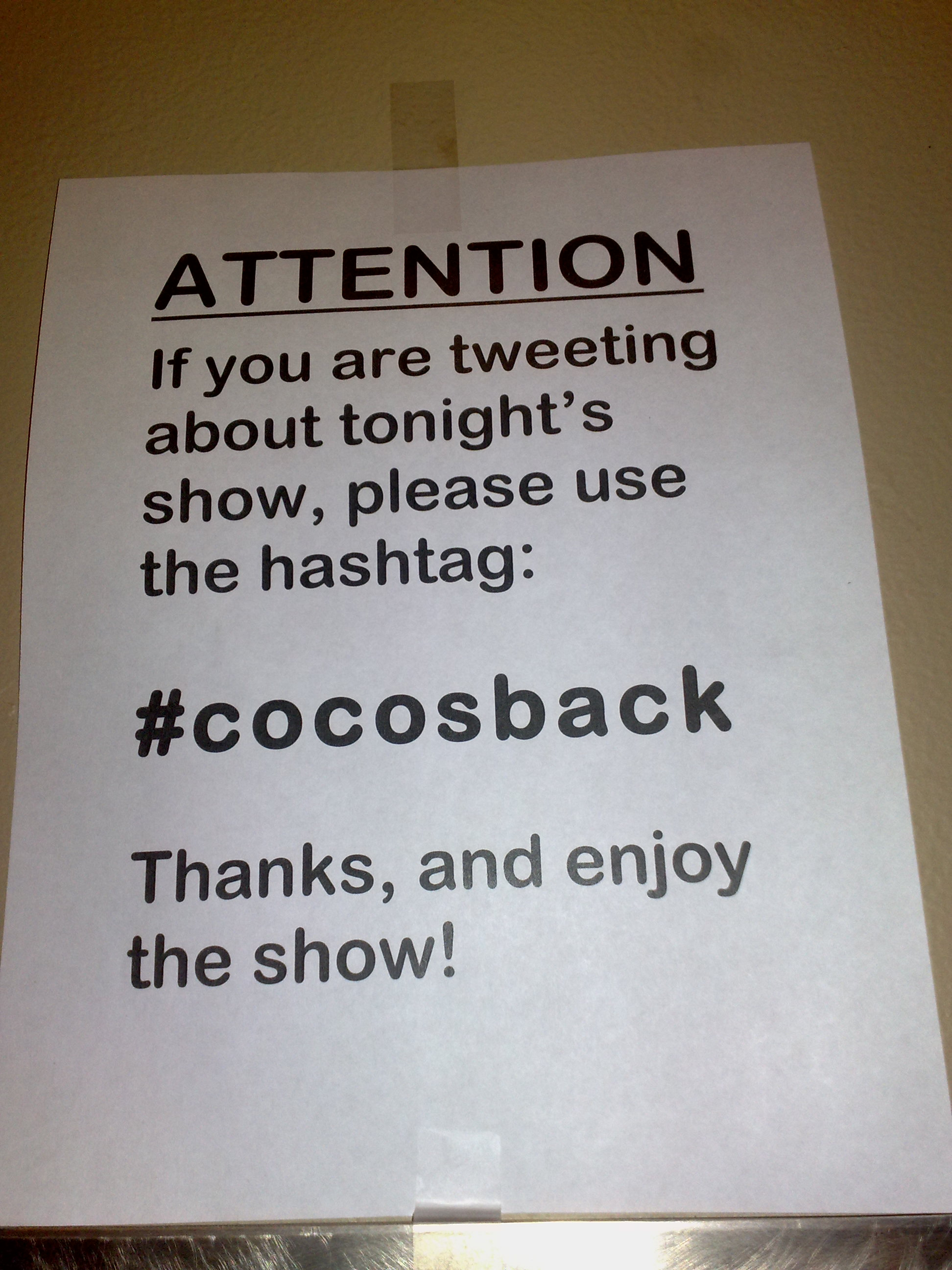
Hashtag from the show of April 24

Date	City	Country	Venue
North America
April 12, 2010	Eugene	United States	Silva Concert Hall
April 13, 2010	Vancouver	Canada	Orpheum Theatre
April 14, 2010	Vancouver	Canada	Orpheum Theatre
April 16, 2010	Spokane	United States	INB Performing Arts Center
April 17, 2010	Edmonton	Canada	The Venue at River Cree Casino
April 18, 2010	Seattle	United States	McCaw Hall
April 19, 2010	Seattle	United States	McCaw Hall
April 22, 2010	San Francisco	United States	Nob Hill Masonic Center
April 23, 2010	San Francisco	United States	Nob Hill Masonic Center
April 24, 2010	Universal City	United States	Gibson Amphitheatre
April 25, 2010	Universal City	United States	Gibson Amphitheatre
April 29, 2010	San Diego	United States	San Diego Civic Theatre
April 30, 2010	Phoenix	United States	Dodge Theatre
May 1, 2010	Paradise	United States	Pearl Concert Theater
May 2, 2010	Paradise	United States	Pearl Concert Theater
May 4, 2010	Reno	United States	Grand Theatre
May 5, 2010	San Jose	United States	Event Center Arena
May 6, 2010	Sacramento	United States	Sacramento Memorial Auditorium
May 9, 2010	Boulder	United States	Macky Auditorium
May 10, 2010	Denver	United States	Ellie Caulkins Opera House
May 13, 2010	University Park	United States	McFarlin Memorial Auditorium
May 14, 2010	Austin	United States	Austin Music Hall
May 15, 2010	Tulsa	United States	Brady Theater
May 16, 2010	Kansas City	United States	Midland Theatre
May 18, 2010	Minneapolis	United States	Orpheum Theatre
May 19, 2010	Chicago	United States	Chicago Theatre
May 20, 2010	Chicago	United States	Chicago Theatre
May 21, 2010	East Lansing	United States	Breslin Student Events Center
May 22, 2010	Toronto	Canada	Massey Hall
May 24, 2010	Columbus	United States	Value City Arena
May 30, 2010	Atlantic City	United States	Borgata Event Center
June 1, 2010	New York City	United States	Radio City Music Hall
June 2, 2010	New York City	United States	Radio City Music Hall
June 4, 2010	Boston	United States	Wang Theatre
June 5, 2010	Boston	United States	Wang Theatre
June 6, 2010	Uncasville	United States	Mohegan Sun Arena
June 7, 2010	Upper Darby Township	United States	Tower Theater
June 8, 2010	Washington, D.C.	United States	DAR Constitution Hall
June 10, 2010	Nashville	United States	Third Man Records
June 11, 2010^{[A]}	Manchester	United States	Comedy Theatre
June 12, 2010^{[A]}	Manchester	United States	Comedy Theatre
June 14, 2010	Atlanta	United States	Fox Theatre

Festivals and other miscellaneous performances

^{[A]}This show is a part of the "Bonnaroo Music Festival"

=== Box office score data ===
Venue	City	Tickets sold / available	Gross revenue
McCaw Hall	Seattle	5,782 / 5,782 (100%)	$328,770
Nob Hill Masonic Center	San Francisco	6,003 / 6,003 (100%)	$362,103
Gibson Amphitheatre	Los Angeles	11,876 / 11,966 (99%)	$685,543
Dodge Theatre	Phoenix	4,923 / 4,923 (100%)	$270,346
Grand Theatre	Reno	1,830 / 1,830 (100%)	$104,695
Event Center Arena	San Jose	4,531 / 4,531 (100%)	$267,495
McFarlin Memorial Auditorium	Dallas	2,422 / 2,422 (100%)	$145,880
The Midland by AMC	Kansas City	2,248 / 2,248 (100%)	$127,396
Orpheum Theatre	Minneapolis	2,515 / 2,515 (100%)	$152,160
Chicago Theatre	Chicago	6,912 / 6,912 (100%)	$364,468
Radio City Music Hall	New York City	11,876 / 11,876 (100%)	$871,641
Wang Theatre	Boston	7,084 / 7,122 (99%)	$456,632
Mohegan Sun Arena	Uncasville, Connecticut	5,276 / 6,020 (88%)	$323,540
Fox Theatre	Atlanta	4,533 / 4,533 (100%)	$280,460
TOTAL		77,811 / 78,683 (99%)	$4,741,129

== Response ==
Just hours before the first show of the tour, O'Brien announced that he would host a new show on cable station TBS, titled Conan, which debuted in November 2010. In addition to the announcement of the television series, TBS also announced a one-hour TBS Special, featuring several writers for Conan, as well as Watts.

With ticket prices starting at $40, The Legally Prohibited from Being Funny on Television Tour sold out. Footage of O'Brien's tour has been uploaded onto YouTube by fans in attendance and immediately went viral. A clip of O'Brien's performance of "I Will Survive", for example, has received more than 320,000 views.

Conan O'Brien Can't Stop, a behind-the-scenes documentary film shot during the tour, was released in June 2011. It focuses on the production of the tour, O'Brien's interactions with fans and his crew, and O'Brien's thoughts on the Tonight Show conflict and legal injunction that inspired the tour. The movie was filmed, directed and produced by director Rodman Flender, a college friend of O'Brien.

== Notes ==
^{a} Sarah Killen was chosen at random to be O'Brien's one follow on Twitter.
^{b} O'Brien performed two shows at the Borgata on May 30, 2010.
