= The Upper Crust =

American hard rock band

- The Upper Crust in 2007

Background information
- Origin: Boston, Massachusetts, U.S.
- Genres: Hard rock, fop rock
- Years active: 1995–present
- Labels: Upstart, Emperor Norton, Reptilian, Upper Crust
- Members: Lord Bendover; Count Bassie; The Duc D'istortion; Jackie Kickassis
- Past members: Lord Rockingham; Marquis de Roque
- Website: theuppercrust.org

The Upper Crust is an American hard rock band from Boston, Massachusetts. The members adopt the personae of 18th-century aristocratic fops and sing songs from that perspective. They use titles of nobility, wear powdered wigs and period costumes, and maintain a snobbish attitude both during live performance and on their albums. The members say that their guiding philosophy is "if not great and excellent, then debauched."

Their major music influence is Bon Scott-era AC/DC, along with glam rock band Kiss and fictional heavy metal band Spinal Tap. Rolling Stone wrote, "[d]ismiss Boston's Upper Crust as a joke rock band if you must, but give them this much: they're actually funny, and there's as much rock as mock to their singular brand of 'roque'", adding "there's plenty of worthy riffs and double-entendre wit to go around". The group originated from a Boston surf rock band called 'The Clamdiggers'. Other related bands were The Bags, The Titanics, The Satanics, The Flies, The Oysters and Seks Bomba.

The Upper Crust has appeared on Late Night with Conan O'Brien and The Late Late Show with Craig Ferguson. The music video game Guitar Hero included the band's signature song "Eureka, I've Found Love" as a bonus song. The band has also guest starred in an episode of Codename: Kids Next Door ("Operation: P.A.R.T.Y.") on Cartoon Network on January 26, 2007, as they perform the songs "Tell Mother I'm Home" and "Let them Eat Rock".

== Members ==
- Lord Bendover (Nat Freedberg) (guitar, vocals) (1995–present)
- Count Bassie (Chris Cote) (bass, vocals) (1996–present)
- The Duc D'istortion (Dave Fredette) (guitar, vocals) (1995–present)
- Jackie Kickassis (Jim Janota) (drums) (1995–present)

== Former members ==
- Lord Rockingham (Ted Widmer) (guitar, vocals) (1995–1997)
- Marquis de Roque (aka Marquis Marque, Marc Mazzarelli) (bass) (1995–1996)

== Discography ==
- Let Them Eat Rock LP (1995) (Upstart Records)
- The Decline and Fall of The Upper Crust LP (1997) (Emperor Norton Records)
- Hell Ain't a Bad Place to Be: A Tribute to AC/DC (compilation) one track: "Back in Black" (1999) (Reptilian Records)
- Entitled – double live album (2000) (Reptilian Records)
- Once More Into the Breeches LP (2001) (Emperor Norton Records)
- Cream of the Crust CD (2006) (Upper Crust Ltd)
- Revenge for Imagined Slights (2009)
- Delusions of Grandeur (2017)

== Filmography ==
- Let Them Eat Rock (Documentary – 2004)
