= Welcome Change Productions =

Welcome Change Productions is an independent documentary production company founded in 1991 by filmmaker Alice Elliott. Their 2002 film The Collector of Bedford Street was nominated for an Academy Award in the short documentary category and won the Best Documentary, Horizon Award, and Audience Award at its world premiere at the Aspen Shortsfest.

Welcome Change specializes in making films that focus on people with disabilities and communities that are reinventing themselves. Their mission is "to lead social change by revealing the big stories hidden in the human heart."

Welcome Change's upcoming film, Miracle on 42nd Street, is a feature-length documentary about the unique apartment complex called Manhattan Plaza located in Manhattan's historic Theater District, a neighborhood also known as Hell's Kitchen. Located on the block between 42nd and 43rd Streets, it is often called the “Miracle on 42nd Street” due to the near-miraculous effect the complex has had on the once-blighted neighborhood and on the lives of its residents. Seventy percent of the occupants work in the performing arts, and thirty percent are Hell's Kitchen residents who are elderly, disabled or have been relocated from substandard housing.

== Alice Elliott ==
Alice Elliott is an Academy Award nominated director, a writer, producer, university level teacher, disability rights advocate, cinematographer, and the recipient of 2012 John Simon Guggenheim Memorial Foundation Fellowship. Alice is also a member of New Day Films, a 40-year-old educational film distribution cooperative. Her short documentary, The Collector of Bedford Street, was nominated for an Academy Award® and aired on HBO/Cinemax. Alice Elliott was the director, co-producer, and the principal verité cinematographer on her latest film, Body & Soul: Diana & Kathy, which aired on PBS for National Disability Awareness Month. Recently she returned from screening Body & Soul: Diana & Kathy in Uzbekistan for the State Department through The American Documentary Showcase, sponsored by the University Film and Video Association. Alice is a full-time faculty member at New York University's Tisch School of the Arts, and has been producing documentaries for almost twenty years.

Her writing includes the Nickelodeon series Are You Afraid of the Dark? She co-authored The Tale of the Bookish Babysitter. With Cliff Bryant, she completed a screen play, HAT TRICK. A published and produced playwright of both adult and children's plays, her work includes the book for Wide Awake Jake, co-authoring The Magic Fishbone with music and lyrics by Tom Chapin and Michael Mark. Her other plays, Willing to be Lucky and The Incredible Shrinking Family, premiered in New York City at the Joseph Campbell/Jean Erdman Open Eye: New Stagings series.

As a performer, she appeared on ABC's daytime drama LOVING for ten years and made two feature films including Four Friends directed by Arthur Penn. For major publishers in New York, she has recorded English as a Second Language programs and was one of the speakers on the TOEFL English Standard audio tests. In addition she has produced or performed in over 200 commercials. She teaches a voice over class for NYU's School of Continuing and Professional Studies, and coaches voice over clients, radio personalities, and public speakers.

She is a member of Actors Equity, American Federation of Radio and Television Artists, Screen Actors Guild, and New York Women in Film and Television (former board member and secretary).

== The Collector of Bedford Street ==
The Collector of Bedford Street is an Academy Award® nominated, 34-minute documentary following Alice's neighbor, Larry Selman. On a yearly basis, Larry collects thousands of dollars for charities while himself living at the poverty line. Larry is a community activist and a fundraiser who has an intellectual disability. When Larry's Uncle Murray becomes unable to care for him, his New York City neighbors come together and establish an adult trust fund to ensure that he continues to live independently in his own apartment.

== Body and Soul: Diana & Kathy ==
Body & Soul: Diana & Kathy is a documentary film about two disabled adults, Diana Braun, who has down syndrome, and Kathy Conour, who has cerebral palsy. The film examines their friendship, as well as their advocation for those with disabilities. The film premiered at the Mill Valley Film Festival in 2007, and has gone on to receive multiple awards, along with being shown at various other film festivals.

== Town Band ==
Town Band is a short documentary film detailing the story of a town band in Callicoon Center, New York. The film explores its effects on the community, as well as its 92 year long history. The film debuted at the Big Eddy Film Festival in 2022.

== Miracle on 42nd Street ==
MIRACLE ON 42ND STREET is a feature-length documentary about the unique apartment complex called Manhattan Plaza located in Manhattan's historic Theater District, a neighborhood also known as Hell's Kitchen. Located on the block between 42nd and 43rd Streets, it is often called the “Miracle on 42nd Street” due to the near-miraculous effect the complex has had on the once-blighted neighborhood and on the lives of its residents. Seventy percent of the occupants work in the performing arts, and thirty percent are Hell's Kitchen residents who are elderly, disabled or have been relocated from substandard housing.

The film documents the development of Manhattan Plaza, its residents, and its management, as well as its reported impact on Manhattan's West Side. Several members of the filmmaking team are current or former residents of Manhattan Plaza. According to the cited source, the film examines the community's cultural, ethnic, and economic diversity.
