= Seinfeld season 1 =

Season of television series

Seinfeld
- Season 1
- DVD cover for seasons one and two
- Showrunner: Larry David
- Starring: Jerry Seinfeld; Julia Louis-Dreyfus; Michael Richards; Jason Alexander
- No. of episodes: 5

Release
- Original network: NBC
- Original release: July 5, 1989 – June 21, 1990

Season chronology
- Next → Season 2

The first season of Seinfeld, an American television series created by Jerry Seinfeld and Larry David, began airing on July 5, 1989, on NBC. Originally called The Seinfeld Chronicles, its name was shortened to Seinfeld after the pilot to avoid confusion with another sitcom called The Marshall Chronicles. The season finale aired on June 21, 1990.

A Seasons 1 & 2 DVD box set was released by Sony Pictures Home Entertainment in the United States and Canada on November 23, 2004, thirteen years after it had completed broadcast on television. In addition to every episode from the two seasons, the DVD release features bonus material, including deleted scenes, animatics, exclusive stand-up material, and commentaries. With only four episodes after the pilot, season one of Seinfeld is one of the smallest sitcom orders in television history.

== Production ==
Castle Rock Entertainment produced Seinfeld. Seinfeld was aired on NBC in the United States. Larry David was the main showrunner and one of the producers. Larry David and Jerry Seinfeld wrote most of the season, with Matt Goldman writing episode three, "The Robbery". The season was directed by Art Wolff and Tom Cherones.

The show features Jerry Seinfeld as himself, Jason Alexander as George Costanza, Julia Louis-Dreyfus as Elaine Benes, and Michael Richards as Kramer. In the pilot, Lee Garlington appears as Claire, the waitress at Pete's Luncheonette, but after the pilot the "gang" started eating at Monk's Cafe. Garlington was set to appear as one of the main supporting characters. Her role was dropped when it was decided that there was no need for a regular female waitress. The character of Claire was replaced with Elaine Benes in the second episode. Jerry refers to Kramer as Kessler; however, his name was changed to Kramer for the rest of the series. Kramer was named after a real person; he was called "Kessler" in the pilot episode because of worries about the rights to use the name.

== Reception ==
The pilot episode was met with poor responses from test audiences, and NBC decided not to pick up the show. Believing it had potential, NBC executive Rick Ludwin ordered four episodes about a year after NBC's rejection. The first aired on May 31, 1990. When the pilot was first repeated on July 5, 1990, it received a rating of 13.9/26, meaning that 13.9% of households were tuned in at any given moment; additionally, 26% of all televisions in use at the time were tuned into it. These ratings were high enough to secure a second season. NBC research showed that the show was popular with young male adults, a demographic sought by advertisers, giving NBC an incentive to continue the show. The episode "The Stake Out" was nominated for a Writer's Guild Award.

Retrospective reception of the season has been positive. The review aggregator website Rotten Tomatoes reported a 76% approval rating for the season, with an average rating of 8.1/10 and based on 29 critic reviews. The website's critics consensus reads: "Seinfeld's first season lays out the template for the show's unique style, effectively outlining the hugless, lesson-free humor that would later make it an oft-imitated classic." On Metacritic, which uses a weighted average, the season has a score of 79 out of 100 based on 9 reviews, indicating "generally favorable reviews". TV Guide ranked it the twenty second greatest television season of all time, being one of four of the series's entries on the list.

== Episodes ==
No. overall	No. in season	Title	Directed by	Written by	Original release date	Prod. code	US viewers (millions)
1	1	"The Seinfeld Chronicles"	Art Wolff	Larry David & Jerry Seinfeld	July 5, 1989	101	15.4
Jerry tells George that Laura, a woman he met on tour, is calling on him while in town. They assume it's a date, but George second-guesses after hearing her exact words, and their waitress, Claire, agrees. After George bursts Jerry's bubble, Jerry's hopes are renewed when Laura asks for an airport pickup and to stay over. Jerry's neighbor Kessler makes a nuisance of himself late at night.
2	2	"The Stake Out"	Tom Cherones	Larry David & Jerry Seinfeld	May 31, 1990	103	22.5
At Elaine's friend's party, keeping Elaine company gets in the way of flirting between Jerry and another woman. Even though Jerry could ask Elaine for the woman's name and number, he has never talked with her about other women since they broke up. Jerry's father, Morty, sends him to "stake out" the woman's office. George comes along, and invents the cover story of a lunch meeting with importer-exporter "Art Vandelay". Kramer advises Jerry's mother, Helen, at playing Scrabble.
3	3	"The Robbery"	Tom Cherones	Matt Goldman	June 7, 1990	104	19.7
George offers to show Jerry a better apartment due to the disrepair of his current place, and Elaine hopes that Jerry will vacate so she can move in. They are all surprised by the other apartment's comforts and amenities. Even as Jerry prepares to sign and Elaine prepares to move, George regrets letting Jerry have the place. Kramer gets Jerry burglarized after leaving his apartment door open, and decides to catch the thief himself.
4	4	"Male Unbonding"	Tom Cherones	Larry David & Jerry Seinfeld	June 14, 1990	102	19.1
Jerry is avoiding clingy childhood friend Joel Horneck, but gets blindsided by a call and must suffer through Horneck's company. George suggests that he break up with Horneck as if he were a woman, so Jerry goes through a textbook breakup that quickly results in guilt and reconciliation. Jerry betrays George by taking back an invitation to a Knicks game so Horneck can go. Kramer looks for investors to open a pizza place where customers do all the cooking.
5	5	"The Stock Tip"	Tom Cherones	Larry David & Jerry Seinfeld	June 21, 1990	105	19.4
George drags Jerry into buying a stock on an insider trading tip. They wait for instructions to sell, but their source is suddenly hospitalized, leaving them in the lurch as the stock price falls. Jerry complains to a dry cleaner about a shrunken shirt. Jerry then takes his girlfriend Vanessa to Vermont on a weekend getaway, but they end up rained in with nothing to do or talk about. Elaine is beleaguered by allergies from dating a cat owner, and Kramer invents a "tie dispenser".
