= The Stock Tip =

- Seinfeld episode
- Episode no.: Season 1 Episode 5
- Directed by: Tom Cherones
- Written by: Larry David; Jerry Seinfeld
- Production code: 105
- Original air date: June 21, 1990

Guest appearances
- Lynn Clark as Vanessa; Ted Davis as Dry Cleaner; Jill C. Klein as Waitress; Benjamin Lum as Stock Boy

Episode chronology
← Previous "Male Unbonding"	Next → "The Ex-Girlfriend"
- Seinfeld season 1

"The Stock Tip" is the fifth and final episode of the first season of the American television sitcom Seinfeld. It first aired on NBC in the United States on June 21, 1990. In the episode, George drags Jerry into buying a stock on an insider trading tip, and Jerry takes his girlfriend on a weekend getaway to Vermont.

The episode was written by series creators Larry David and Jerry Seinfeld, and was directed by Tom Cherones. When it aired, it received enough ratings and praise for NBC to commission a second season.

== Plot ==
At Monk's, Elaine is beleaguered by failing to find a dropped grape in her kitchen, and by allergies from dating a cat owner. Jerry wants a weekend getaway with his girlfriend Vanessa, and Elaine recommends a bed and breakfast in Vermont. George is following rising stock prices for Centrax, which makes technology for "televising opera", thanks to an insider trading tip that his friend is getting from a man named Wilkinson. George invests $5,000 and convinces Jerry to put in $2,500 until Wilkinson says to sell. Elaine shames Jerry out of ordering tuna due to dolphin by-catch, but George, not listening, orders the same.

Jerry sells Vanessa on the Vermont trip to speed their relationship into "phase two", while anxiously following Sendrax's now-falling price. Kramer smugly offers his own "tie dispenser" as a better investment, then asks to bring over some anarchists he met at a rock concert while Jerry is out. Wilkinson is suddenly hospitalized, leaving George and Jerry in the lurch. A dry cleaner stonewalls Jerry's complaint about a shrunken shirt until Jerry finally settles for admitting, unrepentantly, to shrinking it.

Jerry turns down Elaine's invitation to help kill or shave her boyfriend's cats. Kramer spies on a woman downstairs through binoculars and decides to pick her up. George visits Wilkinson in the hospital, but Wilkinson, on the outs with George's friend, throws George out. Jerry sells at a $1,500 loss, while George clings to his sunk cost.

At the bed and breakfast, Jerry and Vanessa are rained in all weekend, and run out of conversation topics. Jerry finds that he actually lost out on $4,000 since Sendrax is now up. Not charmed by the lodging, Vanessa assumes Jerry cheaped out due to his loss. Jerry spends the rest of the trip prying into the name of Vanessa's perfume, but she dumps him rather than tell him.

George flaunts his $8,000 profit, treating Jerry and Elaine to meals while wearing a suit and smoking a cigar. Elaine's boyfriend has chosen the cats over her. George confides another stock tip in a "robot butcher" company. He pays the check without reading it, then double-checks and takes back the overpayment.

== Production ==
"The Stock Tip" was recorded in front of a live studio audience at Ren-Mar Studios in Hollywood, California, on March 12, 1990.

This episode contains the first Seinfeld reference to Superman, which would be a recurring feature in later episodes in the series. An earlier draft of the episode featured Jerry arguing that in a nuclear holocaust, when everyone is very depressed, Superman could cheer everyone up with his "super humor." George responded by saying that no one would laugh because they would blame Superman for not stopping the holocaust in the first place.

The character of Vanessa first appeared earlier in season one in the episode "The Stake Out". She is one of only a few of Jerry's girlfriends to appear in more than one episode. According to Larry David, co-writer of the episode, her character returned because there was no mention of any break-up in "The Stake Out", and therefore the characters were still dating. Benjamin Lum, who plays the grocery store worker, reappears as a mail carrier in the season five episode "The Cigar Store Indian".

== Reception ==
When "The Stock Tip" was first broadcast on June 21, 1990, it attracted a Nielsen rating of 13.5/24, meaning that 13.5% of American households watched the episode, and that 24% of all televisions in use at the time were tuned into it. The second season of Seinfeld was commissioned after this episode and a repeat of the pilot episode was broadcast.

Critics praised several elements of the episode, including Jerry's confrontation with the dry cleaner. Colin Jacobson of DVD Movie Guide said that the episode "succeeded in a few ways. For one, it includes DVD One's [The first disc of the 'Seinfeld Seasons 1 & 2' DVD boxset] funniest bit: Jerry's confrontation with a dry cleaner. In addition, the episode offers our first look at a program that tries to branch out substantially beyond just one story. The prior shows went with one overriding plot, but "Tip" indulges equally in the stock and Vanessa elements. It's still not a great show, but it provides some advancement."

David Sims of The A.V. Club gave the episode a B−. He praised the acting, if not the writing: "Kramer's non-specific glee and Jerry's passive frustration at it are both different tones for the characters, and it's fun to see the show play with the archetypes they've already set up. Later on, after Jerry has cashed out with a loss but George hangs on to make a profit, George's incongruous happiness (replete with cigar, suit, and him daintily picking up the check) is equally amusing. But script-wise, it's again apparent that David and Seinfeld are pretty new to the concept of actually sketching out coherent plots... The whole thing kinda just moves along until it isn't moving along anymore. It's not unfunny, and there's some choice dialog, like Jerry and George having the first of many Superman conversations about whether he has super-humor powers."

Steve Schrider wrote, "While neither the strongest nor the second-strongest show of the first season, The Stock Tip proves that the show has come a long way, even after only five episodes. With this first season, the show's main issue is that it didn't equally utilize all four of its main characters... Jerry and Larry are the first to admit that they went into Seinfeld with little to no writing experience, but they were always very good about recognizing weaknesses and addressing them as needed."
