= The Stake Out (Seinfeld) =

- Seinfeld episode
- Episode no.: Season 1 Episode 2
- Directed by: Tom Cherones
- Written by: Larry David; Jerry Seinfeld
- Production code: 103
- Original air date: May 31, 1990

Guest appearances
- Lynn Clark as Vanessa; Philip Bruns as Morty Seinfeld; Liz Sheridan as Helen Seinfeld; Maud Winchester as Pamela; William Fair as Roger; Ron Steelman as Artie; Joe George as Uncle Mac; Ellen Gerstein as Carol; Janet Rotblatt as Woman

Episode chronology
| ← Previous "The Seinfeld Chronicles" | Next → "The Robbery" |
- Seinfeld season 1

"The Stake Out" is the second episode of the first season of the American television sitcom Seinfeld. It first aired on NBC in the United States on May 31, 1990. The episode was written by Jerry Seinfeld and Larry David and directed by Tom Cherones. In the episode, Jerry fails to flirt with a woman while out with ex-girlfriend Elaine Benes, and Jerry's father sends him on a "stake out" to catch the woman at her workplace.

"The Stake Out" is the first episode to feature Jerry's parents. The episode was nominated for a Writers Guild Award in 1991.

== Plot ==
At a video store, Jerry jokingly shows Elaine a porno film. Elaine gets it as a gag birthday gift for her friend Pamela and invites Jerry along to the party. Despite forgetting that he met Pamela while dating Elaine, Jerry agrees in exchange for Elaine going to a family wedding with him.

Arriving empty-handed at the party, Jerry is intrigued when an attractive woman banters with him. Since they both have companions, they struggle to flirt. Jerry tunes out Elaine telling him about her dream in which he had wooden teeth, but only manages to memorize that the woman works at the law firm "Sagman, Bennett, Robbins, Oppenheim and Taft" before she has to leave. Elaine takes offense at Jerry's distraction during the party.

Jerry's parents, Morty and Helen, are visiting for the wedding, and Jerry has yielded his apartment to them, sleeping at Kramer's. Jerry asks for advice on tracking down the woman from the party, while his parents judge him as picky for breaking up with Elaine. Jerry confesses he could ask Elaine for the woman's number, but that he never talks about other women with her. Morty suggests that Jerry catch the woman at her office by "staking out" the lobby.

George comes along on the stakeout and brainstorms cover stories with Jerry. George wants to pretend to be an architect despite Jerry's skepticism, and they make up a lunch meeting with importer-exporter "Art Corvelay", which George impulsively changes to "Art Vandelay". Their excuse works, and Jerry learns that the woman, Vanessa, is single. Jerry chats her up as George slinks away.

Kramer advises Jerry's mother to play the non-word "quone" in Scrabble against Jerry. She relays a phone call from Elaine, who knowingly namedropped "Art Vandelay".

Jerry is anxious to find out how Elaine reacted to being left out. When she arrives for the wedding, they awkwardly address the elephant in the room, agreeing that they need to talk openly about seeing other people. Elaine turns out to be more relieved than Jerry, as this frees her to taunt him about having met a Wall Street financier who is "hilarious" to boot—by going on a stakeout of her own.

== Production ==
"The Stake Out" is based on a real life incident in which David was with a woman that he had dated previously named Monica Yates (daughter of author Richard Yates). They then went to a restaurant and David met another woman. However, he could not flirt as much as he wanted due to the presence of Yates. David did find out the name of the building where she worked at and staked her out. The names of the people in the title of the law firm are friends Larry David made at college.

This episode prompted running gags that were used in later episodes. These were the phrase "importer-exporter", George's ambitions of becoming an architect and the name "Art Vandelay". The character of Vanessa (named after a woman David once went out with) also reappears in a later episode from the first season, "The Stock Tip".

"The Stake Out" is the first episode to mention the past relationship between Jerry and Elaine. Although it was the third episode to be filmed (after "The Seinfeld Chronicles" and "Male Unbonding"), it was the second episode to be broadcast. The episode order was changed because "The Stake Out" provided more background information about Elaine and her relationship with Jerry. Julia Louis-Dreyfus commented that she liked the script for the episode because it made the character seem human. She also commented on the fact that it was racy due to the mention of a pornographic film.

The opening scene caused some problems because it featured a woman walking off the set and taking one step down to get off it. Gleen Forbes, the set designer, thought that this made the show look cheap. The scene in which Jerry and Elaine are in a taxi was filmed in a studio using a black background and moving a fake taxi, due to budget restraints, in a method known as "Poor Man's Process."

This is the first episode to feature Jerry's parents. Only one casting session was performed to find the actors for the roles. Philip Sterling was originally cast to play the role of Morty Seinfeld, but was replaced with Phil Bruns. Bruns was then replaced as well because Seinfeld and David wanted the character to be harsher. As a result, the role was recast and given to Barney Martin — who had no idea that another actor had already established the part. In this episode Kramer greets Morty by name. Unlike later episodes featuring recast characters, this episode featuring Phil Bruns' scenes were not re-filmed for syndication with Barney Martin substituting for Bruns, as the characters had aged too much in the show for that to be an option.

== Reception ==
When "The Stake Out" was first broadcast on May 31, 1990, the episode attracted a Nielsen rating of 16.2/24, meaning that 16.2% of American households watched the episode, and that 24% of all televisions in use at the time were tuned into it. When the episode was first repeated, on December 2, 1992, a special introductory film was made featuring Louis-Dreyfus and Seinfeld, in which they stated that this episode was the first one they did together. Strictly speaking, though, it was just the first episode broadcast — in terms of production order, "Male Unbonding" was the first episode in which the two characters both appeared.

The episode was nominated for a Writers Guild Award in 1991. Holly E. Ordway for DVD Talk Review commented positively on not just this episode, but the whole of the first season, saying, "What's not to like about an episode like 'The Stakeout,' in which (among other things) we are witness to the invention of George's alter ego, Art Vandelay (and his import/export business)?" Mary Kay Shilling and Mike Flaherty of Entertainment Weekly also liked the episode but had some doubts, saying it was, "A painfully realistic take on the lovers-to-friends transition that should have been more comically fruitful."

However, some reviews of the episode were critical, both now and at the time. When first broadcast, Matt Roush from USA Today wrote: "Lacking much in the way of attitude, the show seems obsolete and irrelevant. What it boils down to is that Seinfeld is a mayonnaise clown in the world that requires a little horseradish."

Colin Jacobson for DVD Movie Guide criticized the writing, saying, "the show's rather bland. It provides the occasional chuckle, but the characters aren't formed yet, and that makes the program ring false. The ending reconciliation between Jerry and Elaine causes particular problems; it doesn't turn sappy, but it comes too close for Seinfeld."
