= Tom's Restaurant =

Diner in Manhattan, New York City

Coordinates: 40°48′20″N 73°57′56″W

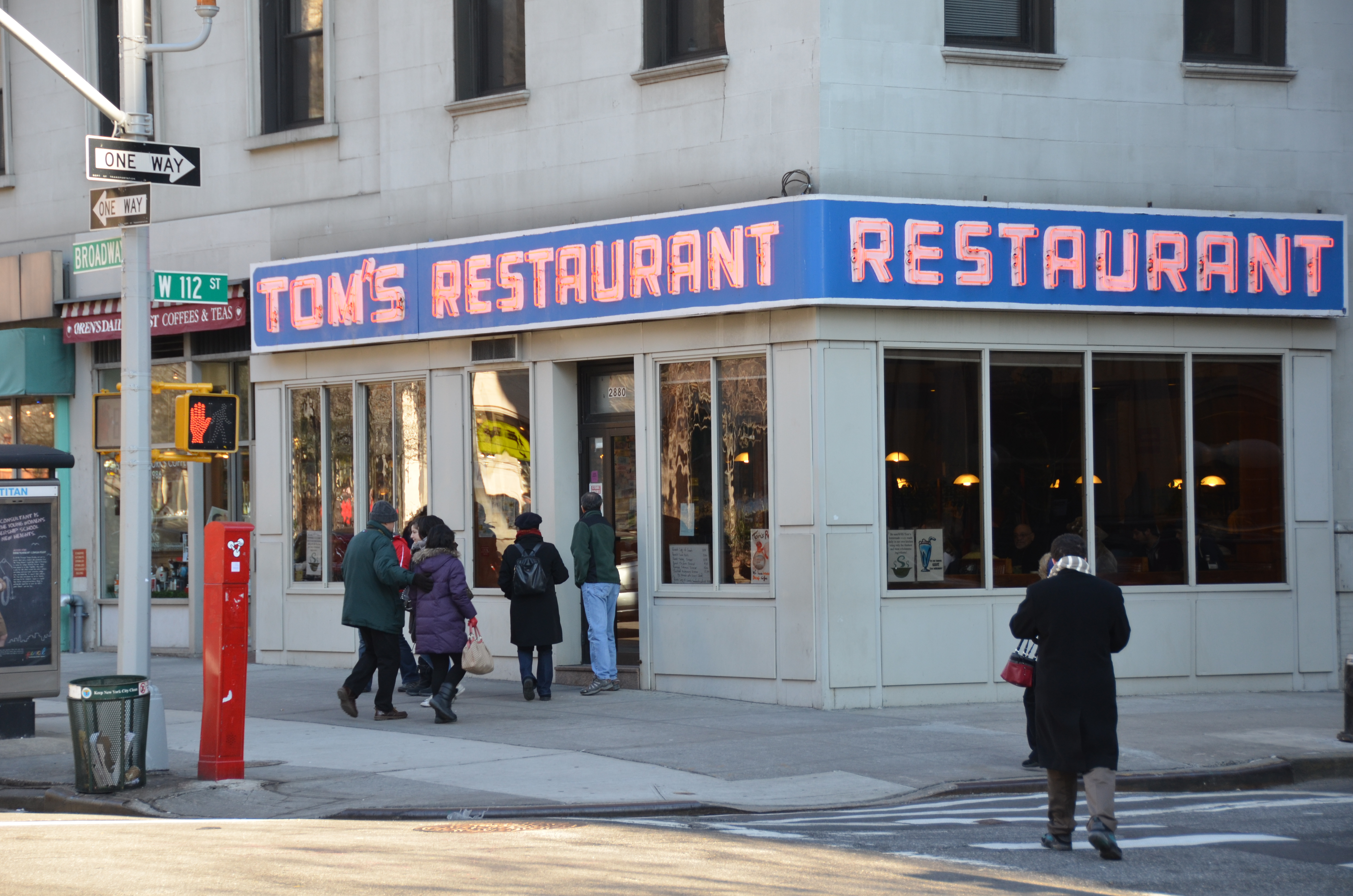
- Tom's Restaurant in 2012
- Interactive map of Tom's Restaurant

Restaurant information
- Location: 2880 Broadway; Morningside Heights, Manhattan, New York City, New York

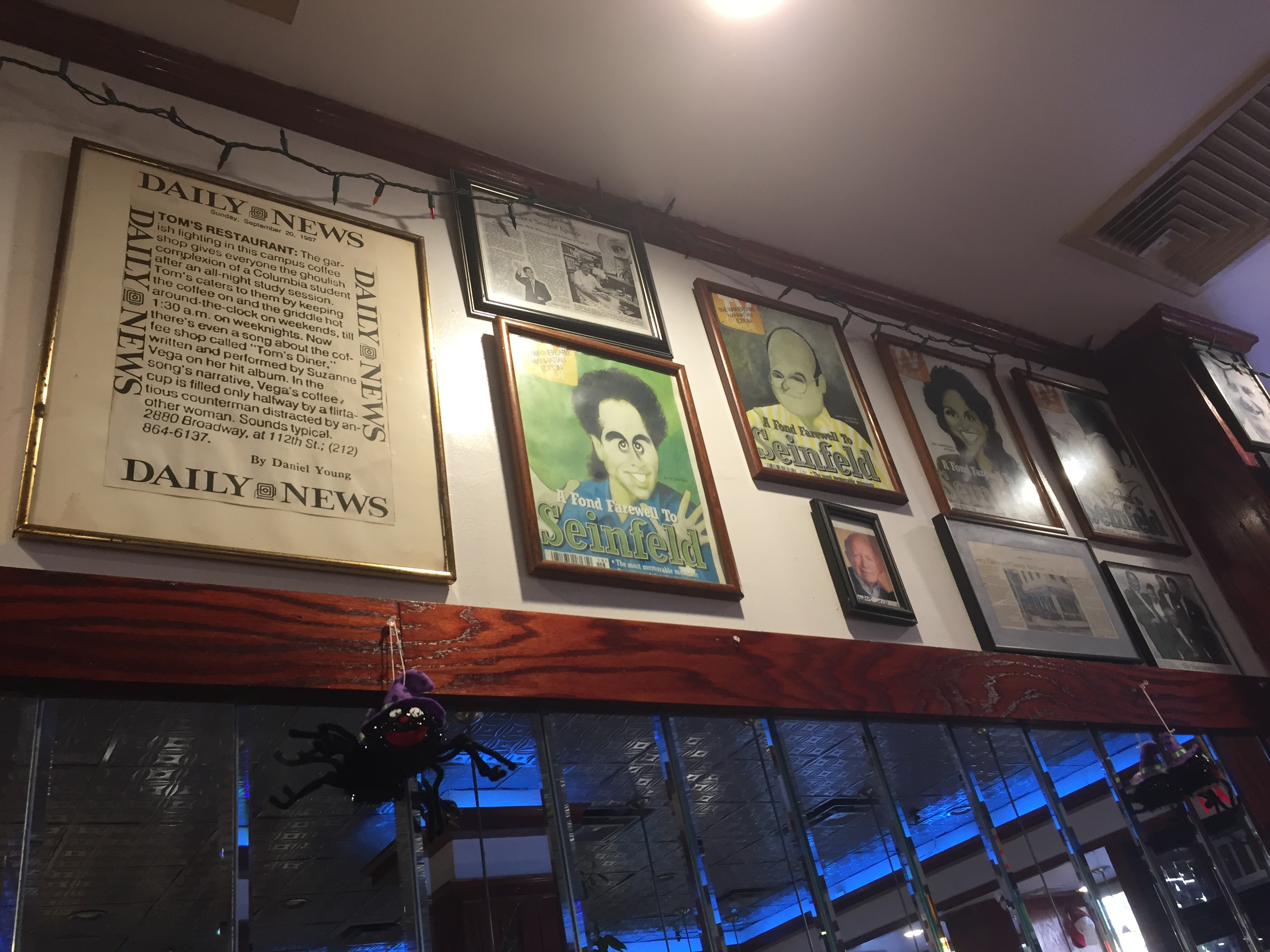
Tom's Restaurant interior

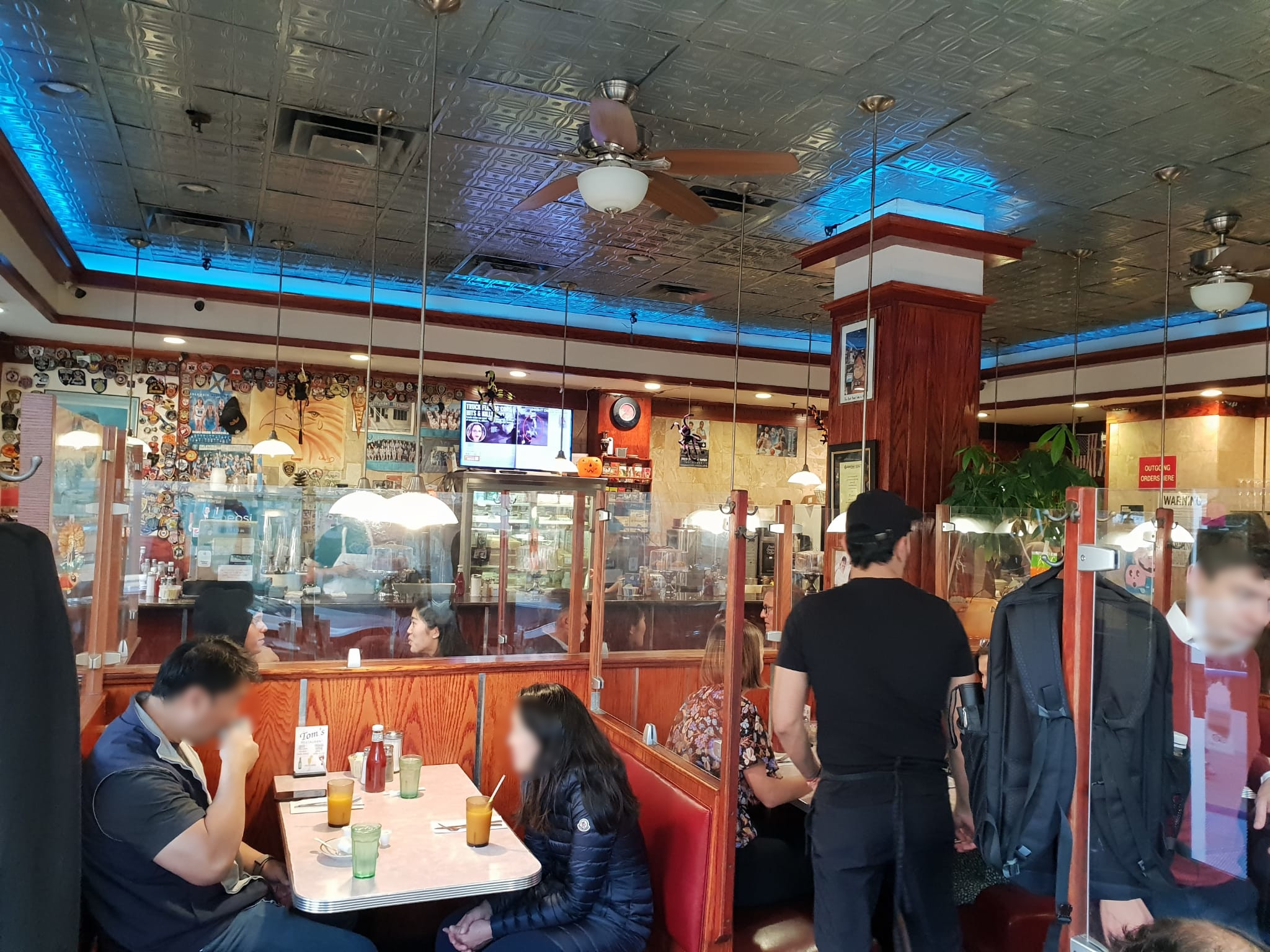
Tom's Restaurant interior

Tom's Restaurant is a diner located at 2880 Broadway (on the corner of West 112th Street) in the Morningside Heights neighborhood of Manhattan in New York City. It is on the ground floor of Columbia University's Armstrong Hall, home to the Goddard Institute for Space Studies. Frequented by Columbia students and faculty, it was founded by Tom Glikas in the 1940s and after a sale at some undetermined point has been owned and operated by the Greek-American family of Minas Zoulis, who retained the original name.

Senator John McCain often ate at Tom's when he visited his daughter Meghan when she was a student at Columbia. Likewise, Barack Obama frequented the restaurant as a student at Columbia.

== In popular culture ==
Tom's Restaurant was the locale that inspired Suzanne Vega's 1987 song "Tom's Diner." Vega is an alumna of nearby Barnard College.

Later, its exterior was used as a stand-in for the fictional Monk's Café in the 1989–1998 television sitcom Seinfeld, where comedian Jerry Seinfeld's eponymous character and his friends regularly convened to dine. The interior shown on the television show, however, looked very little like the real Tom's, as indoor scenes were filmed on a set in Los Angeles. Early Seinfeld episodes showed the entire neon sign; later, the "Tom's" portion was cropped out, or dimmed, showing only the "RESTAURANT" wraparound. Even though the interior and exterior have undergone minor remodeling since the show, the distinctive sign has remained the same. Tom's is featured in "Kramer's Reality Tour" conducted by Kenny Kramer.

== See also ==
- List of restaurants in New York City
