= Male Unbonding =

- Seinfeld episode
- Episode no.: Season 1 Episode 4
- Directed by: Tom Cherones
- Written by: Larry David; Jerry Seinfeld
- Production code: 102
- Original air date: June 14, 1990

Guest appearances
- Kevin Dunn as Joel Horneck; Anita Wise as Waitress; Frank Piazza as Customer; Kimberley LaMarque as Teller

Episode chronology
← Previous "The Robbery"	Next → "The Stock Tip"
- Seinfeld season 1

"Male Unbonding" is the fourth episode of the first season of the American television sitcom Seinfeld (and the second episode of the series in production order). It first aired on NBC in the United States on June 14, 1990. The episode was written by Larry David and Jerry Seinfeld, and was the first filmed episode directed by Tom Cherones. In this episode, Jerry, after spending years avoiding his unwanted friend Joel Horneck (Kevin Dunn), tries to "break up" as if he were a woman.

This was the first episode produced with Elaine Benes (Julia Louis-Dreyfus) as a character. It also was the first episode to use Jonathan Wolff's title music. This is the only Seinfeld episode whose title does not begin with the definite article "The".

== Plot ==
George fears that he doomed his relationship by telling his girlfriend he likes her, having blurted this out after a piece of dental floss in his pocket got stuck to his hand. Jerry suggests that George is more likely to get dumped for the fanny pack he is wearing.

Jerry is blindsided when Kramer hands him a call from Joel Horneck, a clingy childhood friend who has been calling for 7 years. Through gritted teeth, Jerry accepts his invitation to meet. Since Jerry has been reduced to vigilantly avoiding Horneck's calls, George suggests Jerry decisively "break up" with Horneck as if he were a woman, even though Jerry calls this unprecedented between men.

Meeting at Monk's Café, Jerry jokes about performing for Hezbollah, confirming that Horneck, self-involved as always, does not hear a word he says. Jerry also disapproves of his overbearing demands for unprocessed turkey meat. Jerry goes through a textbook breakup with Horneck, offering excuses like "it's not you, it's me", then is guilted into taking it back when Horneck pitifully breaks down in tears. Jerry reconciles by inviting Horneck to a Knicks game, and Horneck reverts to his old self. However, Jerry has already invited George and must take it back.

George gets dumped by his girlfriend but finishes his meal with her and ends up paying the bill. At the bank, he tries to change a large jar of coins into bills but is forced to roll the coins himself. George feels betrayed by Jerry reneging on the Knicks game and refuses to go with Horneck, so Jerry backs out with a made-up excuse, leaving Horneck with both tickets. Kramer plans to open a pizza place where customers knead and cook their own pizzas and invites them to invest.

Elaine finds that Jerry has compiled a list of excuses to use on Horneck and adds some humiliating ones to the list. Kramer returns from the Knicks game with Horneck, having befriended him over the earlier phone call. Horneck realizes Jerry made up his excuse but is not dissuaded from roping Jerry and Elaine into another Knicks game. Jerry and Elaine work together to invent more excuses, but cannot keep up with Horneck, who is scouring the entire season schedule on their behalf.

Kramer's pizza parlor idea reappears in later episodes such as "The Puffy Shirt" in season 5, and "The Couch" in season 6.

== Production ==
This is the first episode that was made after the original pilot, "The Seinfeld Chronicles". The title of the series was shortened to Seinfeld to avoid confusion with another sitcom called The Marshall Chronicles.

This is the only episode that does not have "the" in the title. A decision was made to name all the episodes in this way so that the writers would not waste time trying to think of funny titles and instead make the content of the episode funny. However, this decision was made after the script for "Male Unbonding" was completed. Jerry Seinfeld tried to have the title of the episode changed to "The Male Unbonding" some time later, but was unsuccessful.

This is the first episode written which stars the character of Elaine. The first version of the script does not include Elaine, despite the fact that one of the conditions given when Seinfeld was given a series was that a female character was included. Originally, the character's name was Eileen. Louis-Dreyfus claims that she was unhappy with only being given one scene in the first episode in which she appeared, but said that she performed well in the episode. Similarly, other early versions of the script refer to the character of Kramer as "Breckman". Kevin Dunn, who plays Joel in the episode, auditioned for the role of George Costanza in the original pilot. The episode also stars Anita Wise, who plays a waitress. Wise appeared again in another episode from the first season of Seinfeld titled "The Robbery". Frank Piazza, a customer at the bank appears in the season 2 episode "The Stranded".

This episode features different title music from the pilot; this music, composed by Jonathan Wolff, is used throughout the rest of the series. The standup interstitials for this episode were recorded twice. Originally, the set for the interstitials was brightly lit and was designed to look like that of a church basement, but then it was remade to look like a nightclub and the material was performed again. The scene that was set in the bank was originally set in a dry cleaner's. However, this was moved and some of the material was moved to a later episode called "The Stock Tip".

An alternate, longer version of the ending was filmed: Elaine gives up and leaves, but Horneck is sure that she likes him. Jerry puts his foot down and breaks up again, and Horneck seems to accept it. However, he borrows a k.d. lang tape and promises to return it, revealing that nothing has changed. Jerry realizes that he will return just like Jason from the Friday the 13th films. "Male Unbonding" was filmed on February 13, 1990.

== Reception ==
When first broadcast on June 14, 1990, the episode attracted a Nielsen rating of 13.6/24, meaning that 13.6% of American households watched the episode, and that 24% of all televisions in use at the time were tuned into it. Several reviews at the time compared Seinfeld to It's Garry Shandling's Show, in which Garry Shandling, like Seinfeld, plays a fictionalized version of himself.

Jonathan Boudreaux writes that of the four season one episodes produced after the pilot, "'Male Unbonding' is the strongest. This episode centers on the classic Seinfeld theme of the gang complaining about an outsider's self-centeredness while conveniently ignoring their own selfish, antisocial behavior. The characters slowly begin to fall into place as George takes great strides toward being the neurotic moron we love, and Kramer becomes more spastic and idiosyncratic."

Colin Jacobson for DVD Movie Guide was also positive, saying, "'Unbonding' marks a demonstrable improvement over the pilot. No one will mistake the episode for one of the series' greats, but at least the characters start to resemble the ones we'd come to know later. In addition, it tosses out just enough humor to make it enjoyable." David Sims of The A.V. Club gave the episode a B+, saying, "It's a pretty funny episode – my main criticism is just that at this point, Kramer isn't integrated at all into the stories, rather he just comes by and dispenses weird dialog for a couple minutes."
