= Stan Brooks =

Stan Brooks may refer to:

- Stanley Brooks, American film and television producer
- Stan Brooks (radio broadcaster) (1927–2013), American radio broadcaster
- Stan Brookes (born 1953), English footballer
