= Cindy Cowan =

American film producer and songwriter

- Born: Miami, Florida, US
- Education: Tulane University
- Occupations: Film producer, songwriter, actor
- Years active: 1975–present
- Notable work: Miracle on 42nd Street
- Website: cowanent.com

Cindy Cowan Miami, Florida,) is an American film producer, songwriter, and actor.

Cowan graduated from Tulane University and attended graduate courses toward a master's degree in psychology at Harvard. Her producing career began as a producer and writer for a CBS News affiliate in Miami, Florida.

In 1995, Cowan co-founded Initial Entertainment Group (IEG) with Graham King. During her tenure as president, IEG had successes that included: an Emmy nomination for Rent-A-Kid starring Leslie Nielsen; Emmy, Golden Globe and People's Choice nominations for If These Walls Could Talk; a United Nations Award for Savior starring Dennis Quaid; and Oscar-winning Traffic starring Michael Douglas. Additional projects produced by Cowan included Very Bad Things and Robert Altman's Dr. T & the Women.

In 1999, Cowan sold her two-thirds stake in IEG to Splendid Films and started Cindy Cowan Entertainment where she produced Scorched, Fifty Dead Men Walking, and Red Lights starring Robert De Niro and Sigourney Weaver.

As a songwriter and lyricist, Cowan has written songs for film and television; an album title track for Engelbert Humperdinck, a chart topping hit "This Love is Forever" for Howard Hewett, and several songs for Pamala Stanley.

== Filmography ==
Year	Title	Executive Producer	Producer	Actor	Notes
1995	Power of Attorney	Yes			Video
1996	Precious Find	Yes			
1996	Mojave Moon	Yes			
1997	Changing Habits	Yes			
1997	Little City	Yes			
1998	Montana	Yes			
1998	Savior	Yes			
1998	Very Bad Things		Yes		
2000	Dr. T & the Women	Yes			
2003	Scorched	Yes			
2008	Fifty Dead Men Walking	Yes			
2012	Red Lights	Yes			
2012	Smiley	Yes			
2016	The Axe Murders of Villisca	Yes			
2017	Kiki Mobile	Yes			TV series; 3 episodes; Co-executive
2017	Miracle on 42nd Street		Yes		
2019	Slasher Party		Yes		Co-producer
2019	Unseen	Yes			Short film
2019	La Ruta	Yes			Short film
2019	Rattlesnakes			Yes	Role: Mrs. Jones
2020	Arkansas	Yes			
2021	Evie Rose		Yes		Short film
2023	The Haunting in Wicker Park		Yes		Post-production; a.k.a. The Haunting
