= The Robbery =

- Seinfeld episode
- Episode no.: Season 1 Episode 3
- Directed by: Tom Cherones
- Written by: Matt Goldman
- Production code: 104
- Original air date: June 7, 1990

Guest appearances
- Anita Wise as Waitress; James F. Dean as Larry; Kimberley Kates as Diane; Bradford English as Cop; David Blackwood as Man #1; George C. Simms as Man #2

Episode chronology
← Previous "The Stake Out"	Next → "Male Unbonding"
- Seinfeld season 1

"The Robbery" is the third episode of the first season of the American television sitcom Seinfeld. It first aired on NBC in the United States on June 7, 1990. It was written by Matt Goldman, making this the first Seinfeld episode not written by series creators Jerry Seinfeld and Larry David.

In the episode, George and Elaine try to sell Jerry on leasing a new apartment. Meanwhile, Jerry's apartment is burglarized after Kramer leaves the front door open. George shows Jerry an apartment so ideal that he starts regretting the offer, while Elaine jumps the gun on planning her move into Jerry's apartment.

== Plot ==
Elaine is watching Jerry's apartment while he goes on tour in Minneapolis. Jerry briefs her on the apartment's defects and eccentricities, and George adds even more. George offers to show Jerry an Upper West Side apartment next to Central Park. Elaine hopes to move into Jerry's apartment and escape her roommate, who noisily practices for a production of A Chorus Line at all hours.

Jerry has no time to consider the offer before heading out. He returns to find his TV, VCR, and other valuables stolen, because, while Elaine was out, Kramer left the front door wide open to borrow a spatula, then forgot to come back while watching The Bold and the Beautiful. Since Jerry bought a secure lock instead of insurance, he has no theft coverage. Kramer vows to find the stolen goods, but Jerry expects nothing as he files a police report.

When George finds Jerry's lobby door not locking, Jerry decides to see the other apartment. Everyone—even George—is surprised to find a fireplace, garden, natural lighting, and a walk-in closet. Jerry imagines hiring many helpers he will need to tip, but decides to move in. Elaine, already planning her move into Jerry's place, drives a hard bargain to buy his couch.

George, now thoroughly regretful, offers to take the new apartment in case Jerry gets cold feet. Neither wants to take the apartment away from the other, while Elaine wants either of them to vacate. After they flip a coin, Jerry plays "choose" for it, and wins the apartment to George's great disappointment. Kramer baselessly suspects a neighbor from England was the thief, and begins hassling the man.

At Monk's Café, George still can't let the apartment go, and he and Jerry finally back out together. A waitress overhears and ends up leasing the apartment, inviting them and Elaine to her housewarming. Elaine is still stuck with her roommate after hastily renting a U-Haul and throwing out her own couch. All three mope as they learn of the many benefits the new tenants have reaped from the apartment. In their dejection, they overhear someone else giving up his apartment, and all inquire at once.

== Production ==
"The Robbery" was written by Matt Goldman, making this episode the first not to be written by Jerry Seinfeld or Larry David and the only one not written by Seinfeld and David for the first production season. The idea for the episode was inspired by Seinfeld's own experiences of his apartment being robbed when he was a student, although rather than the door being unlocked as it was in the episode, the burglars broke through the walls. David was given a $20,000 bonus by Castle Rock and was promoted to executive producer for his work on the episode. During the shooting of the episode, an earthquake struck the set, but no one was hurt.

The episode is the first to mention the character of Tina, Elaine's actress roommate, although she does not appear in this episode. It is also the first episode to feature Kramer making a sliding entrance into Jerry's apartment, which became a trademark in all the later episodes. Carolyn the waitress, played by Anita Wise, and her husband Larry, are named after Seinfeld's own sister and brother-in-law.

In the original draft of the script, the Englishman is called "Berbick." In the same script, Elaine asks Jerry what happened between Kramer and the Englishman. Jerry replies, "Kramer stayed there three hours. They're like best friends now."

== Reception ==
When "The Robbery" first aired on June 7, 1990, it received a Nielsen rating of 13.6/24. This means that the episode was watched by 13.6% of American households, and that 24% of all televisions in use at the time were tuned into it.

Reviews of the episode were mixed. Andy Patrizio from IGN.com wrote that "The Robbery" was the best episode of the first season of Seinfeld, saying that it showed "the dynamics that would come to define the show." However, Colin Jacobson for DVD Movie Guide said, "It lacks the great banter and play that marks the best episodes, but it doesn't come across as a total dud. It just seems a bit uninspired in the greater scheme of things."
