= David Todd (architect) =

American architect

- Born: February 22, 1915; Middletown, Ohio, U.S.
- Died: March 31, 2008 (aged 93); New York City, New York, U.S.
- Education: University of Michigan
- Occupation: Architect
- Spouse: Suzanne Williams
- Practice: Harrison, Ballard & Alle

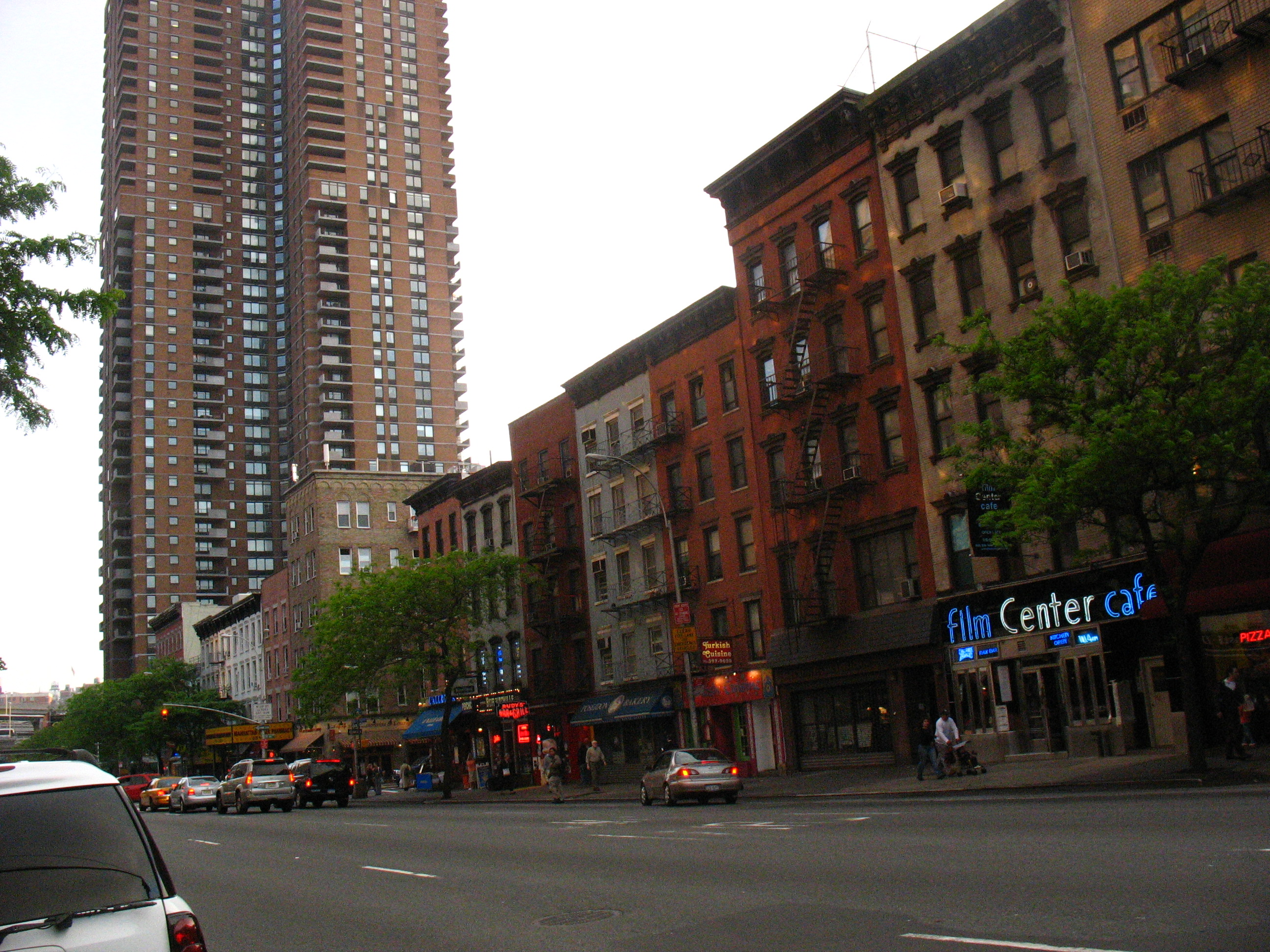
Photo of one of the Manhattan Plaza high rises, shown against surrounding buildings in the neighborhood. Manhattan Plaza was designed by David Todd.

David F. M. Todd (February 22, 1915 – March 31, 2008) was a New York City-based American architect. Todd was best known for designing the Manhattan Plaza complex and serving as chairman of the Landmarks Preservation Commission in 1989 and 1990.

== Early life ==
David Fenton Michie Todd was born in Middletown, Ohio, on February 22, 1915. He graduated from Dartmouth College in 1937 before receiving his bachelor's degree in architecture from the University of Michigan in 1940. He married Suzanne Williams in 1942.

Todd served in the United States Army in the Pacific during World War II.

== Career ==
David Todd joined the Harrison, Ballard & Allen architectural firm in 1946, following the end of World War II. He became a full partner in the firm in 1967, and it was renamed Ballard, Todd & Snibbe. In 1967 the firm was simply known as David Todd & Associates.

Some of Todd's notable clients included the State University of New York, Princeton University, Lehman College, the Collegiate School on the Upper West Side of Manhattan, as well as vacation resorts in St. Martin and Puerto Rico. However, Todd's personal interest in architecture often centered on theaters and public housing. Todd advocated that money be spent to improve the living conditions in subsidized public housing beginning in 1965.

=== Manhattan Plaza ===
Todd's architectural firm's best-known project was the Manhattan Plaza. The design for the Manhattan Plaza, which was designed by David Todd and Robert Cabrera, called for two large, 45 story red brick apartment buildings on either end of the block, with lower buildings in between them. The Manhattan Plaza project encompasses a single large, city square block surrounded 42nd Street and 43rd Street and Ninth Avenue and Tenth Avenue.

Todd explained his choice to place the large apartment buildings on the ends of the block, rather than the center of it, saying that, "Larger structures in midblock would have cut the sunlight and would have destroyed the small scale of the midblock areas as well."

== Death ==
David Todd died in Manhattan on March 31, 2008, at the age of 93. He was survived by his wife, Suzanne Williams.
