= Martha Swope =

American photographer (1928–2017)

- Born: February 22, 1928; Tyler, Texas, U.S.
- Died: January 12, 2017 (aged 88)
- Education: Baylor University; School of American Ballet
- Occupation: Photographer

Martha Joan Swope (February 22, 1928 – January 12, 2017) was an American photographer of theatre and dance.

== Early life and education ==
Born in Tyler, Texas, she studied at Baylor University in Waco, Texas, before becoming a student at the School of American Ballet in the 1950s.

== Career ==
Her photography career started in 1957, when Jerome Robbins invited her to photograph rehearsals for West Side Story. Soon afterwards, Lincoln Kirstein hired her as the first official photographer for the New York City Ballet. She photographed figures in the dance world including George Balanchine, Michael Bennett, Joe Papp, and David Merrick. She was known for taking photos onstage while posed in the fourth position.

She documented over 800 productions in her lifetime. To her, rehearsals were "where you see the creativity and the interchange, how it grows to what it comes to be onstage".

She stopped taking photos when she retired in 1994, saying that "now I think it's somebody else's era".

== Death ==
Swope died from Parkinson's disease on January 12, 2017, at the age of 88.

== In media ==
Her photographs have been featured in many newspapers and journals, including Life magazine and The New York Times. She donated her archive of 1.5 million images to the New York Public Library for the Performing Arts at Lincoln Center in 2010.

=== Awards and achievements ===
In 2004, Swope received a Tony Honor for Excellence in Theater award, and in 2007, she was given a lifetime achievement award from the League of Professional Theater Women.

== Legacy ==
Swope's photographs were displayed in multiple books: Baryshnikov on Broadway: Photographs, Tanaquil Le Clercq's Mourka: The Autobiography of a Cat, Kenneth Laws's Physics and the Art of Dance, and Denny Martin Flinn's What They Did for Love: The Untold Story Behind the Making of A Chorus Line.

== Personal life ==
She lived in a brownstone on 72nd Street in New York City. She used her bathroom as a darkroom and her closet was her film developing room.

Besides ballet and photography, Swope had an immense passion for animals and travel. She rescued and took care of stray dogs. One of her dogs was named "Topo". When she later moved to the Manhattan Plaza apartment complex on West 43rd Street, she adopted a greyhound mix named "Bert".

She also visited a sundry mix of places, such as Africa, Switzerland, and Italy. Although Swope had a lively and caring spirit, she was also very private about her personal life and actually avoided going to the theatre "because of crowds".
