= The Collector of Bedford Street =

- Directed by: Alice Elliott
- Produced by: Alice Elliott
- Cinematography: Cynthia Wade; Alice Elliott
- Edited by: Melissa Hacker
- Music by: Joel Goodman
- Distributed by: New Day Films
- Release date: 2002
- Running time: 36 minutes
- Country: United States
- Language: English

The Collector of Bedford Street is a 2002 documentary film about director Alice Elliott's neighbor, Larry Selman, a community activist and fundraiser who had an intellectual disability.

== Background ==
When Larry's primary caregiver becomes unable to care for him, his New York City neighborhood community rallies together to protect his independent lifestyle by establishing an adult trust fund in his behalf.

Larry is the beneficiary of an Adult Supplemental Needs Trust, which was sponsored by the Bedford-Barrow-Commerce (BBC) Block Association through the UJA-Federation Community Trust for Disabled Adults. The BBC's sponsorship of Larry marked the first time a group outside of a beneficiary's family established an Adult Supplemental Needs Trust.

The Collector of Bedford Street DVD is being used by Kiwanis International for training Key Leaders in service around the world.

== Accolades ==
The Collector of Bedford Street has screened at more than 70 film festivals around the world, including the Black Maria Film Festival, Aspen Short Film festival and Heartland Festival. The film was nominated for the 2002 Academy Award for Best Documentary (Short Subject).

== See also ==
- List of documentary films
- List of American films of 2003
