= Rick Ludwin =

American television executive (1948–2019)

- Born: Richard Adam Ludwin; May 27, 1948; Cleveland, Ohio, U.S.
- Died: November 10, 2019 (aged 71); Los Angeles, California, U.S.
- Education: Miami University
- Occupation: NBC television executive
- Years active: 1980–2012
- Known for: Championing Seinfeld's first season; The Tonight Show, Late Night with Conan O'Brien, and Saturday Night Live

Richard Adam Ludwin (May 27, 1948 – November 10, 2019) was an American television executive and former vice president at NBC Television. He is notable as the executive who backed Jerry Seinfeld's series Seinfeld, which went on to become one of the most popular and successful television sitcoms of all time. During his 31 years at NBC, Ludwin worked with every The Tonight Show host—Steve Allen and Jack Paar, albeit after their time on Tonight, as well as Johnny Carson, Jay Leno, Conan O'Brien, and Jimmy Fallon. He also helped guide the network through the Conan O'Brien and Jay Leno conflict in 2010.

== Early life and education ==
Ludwin was born in Cleveland, Ohio, on May 27, 1948, and grew up in the suburb of Rocky River. He graduated from Rocky River High School in 1966 and attended Miami University in Oxford, Ohio, graduating with a degree in mass communications in 1970.

Ludwin started his television career in 1968 hosting the talk show Studio 14 on Miami University's WMUB-TV Channel 14. For years, Ludwin returned to his alma mater to talk to students. In March 2019, the Williams Hall studio where he began his television career was named the Richard A. Ludwin Television Production Facility.

He also donated items and memorabilia—including 15 original Seinfeld scripts—to the university, where it is now housed as the Rick Ludwin Collection.

== Career ==
In the 1970s, Ludwin wrote jokes for Bob Hope and produced a variety show that aired in Ohio. After graduating from college, Ludwin joined NBC in 1980 and worked at the network for 32 years, during which time he was executive vice president of late night and special programming. As vice president, he oversaw The Tonight Show with Jay Leno, Late Night with Conan O'Brien, and Saturday Night Live. He was a staunch supporter of Late Night with Conan O'Brien during its fledgling early years, when other executives wanted the show cancelled, and championed several other notable series, including Seinfeld and The Office.

Even though Ludwin had never worked on a sitcom before, he commissioned the Seinfeld pilot "The Seinfeld Chronicles", which aired in 1989. Other NBC executives wanted to pass on the series, but Ludwin lobbied on behalf of the show and used money from his specials budget to order four more episodes. Though market testing was mostly negative in response to "The Seinfeld Chronicles", Ludwin believed in the show so much he canceled a planned Bob Hope special in order to finance Seinfeld's first full season. When then-NBC President Brandon Tartikoff worried it was "too New York" and "too Jewish" and thus would not be popular with mainstream American audiences, Ludwin, who was not Jewish, defended the show and its content. The series was immensely popular, earning NBC more than $2 billion during its nine seasons.

Ludwin was promoted to executive vice president from senior vice president in 2005. Following the 2010 Tonight Show conflict, Ludwin fell out of favor with Jay Leno, who was unhappy the executive had backed Conan O'Brien over him. Leno stopped communicating with Ludwin. In September 2011, NBC announced that Ludwin would make a transition into acting as a consultant for the network. He left NBC in 2012.

== Death and legacy ==
Ludwin died from organ failure in Los Angeles on November 10, 2019, at age 71. Late night television hosts Conan O'Brien, Seth Meyers, and Jimmy Fallon paid tribute to him on their respective shows, as well as a tribute on a Saturday Night Live episode on November 16, 2019.

A character named Rick Ludwin appears in Jerry Seinfeld's 2024 film Unfrosted, played by Max Greenfield.
