= Very Bad Things =

- Theatrical release poster
- Directed by: Peter Berg
- Written by: Peter Berg
- Produced by: Cindy Cowan; Diane Nabatoff; Michael Schiffer
- Starring: Christian Slater; Cameron Diaz; Daniel Stern; Jeanne Tripplehorn; Jon Favreau; Jeremy Piven; Leland Orser
- Cinematography: David Hennings
- Edited by: Dan Lebental
- Music by: Stewart Copeland
- Production companies: Initial Entertainment Group; Interscope Communications; BallPark Productions
- Distributed by: PolyGram Filmed Entertainment (United States, Canada, United Kingdom and Ireland); Initial Entertainment Group (International)
- Release date: November 25, 1998
- Running time: 100 minutes
- Country: United States
- Language: English
- Budget: $30 million
- Box office: $21 million

Very Bad Things is a 1998 American black comedy film written and directed by Peter Berg in his feature film directorial debut and starring Cameron Diaz, Jon Favreau, Daniel Stern, Jeremy Piven, Christian Slater, Leland Orser, Kobe Tai and Jeanne Tripplehorn.

The plot follows a group of men who become embroiled in crime and betrayal after they attempt to conceal an accidental death. Very Bad Things was released by PolyGram Filmed Entertainment in the United States, Canada, the United Kingdom and Ireland on November 25, 1998, with Initial Entertainment Group releasing in other territories. The film was not well received and grossed $21 million against a $30 million budget.

== Plot ==
Kyle Fisher and Laura Garrety are a young suburbanite couple days away from their wedding. While Laura finalizes last-minute wedding details, Kyle is away in Las Vegas celebrating his bachelor party with four friends—real estate agent Robert Boyd, mechanic Charles Moore, and brothers Adam and Michael Berkow. As part of the festivities, Robert hires a stripper named Tina to entertain the men in their hotel room. Tina is accidentally killed while having rough sex with Michael in the bathroom. Robert convinces the guys that the best option is to stay quiet about it and bury her body in the desert. A security guard arrives to investigate the noise in the guys' room and discovers Tina's corpse. In desperation, Robert stabs the guard to death. He then convinces the group to dismember both bodies and bury them in the desert before returning home.

At the rehearsal dinner, Adam cracks under the pressure of guilt, leading to a confrontation with Michael outside and Adam threatening to turn him over to the police. As Michael leaves the dinner, he attempts to ram Adam's beloved minivan with his Jeep. Adam runs to protect his van but is crushed in the collision. In the hospital, Adam whispers something to his wife Lois before dying, as Robert looks on through a glass window.

Lois demands answers about what happened in Las Vegas and finds a written confession by Adam. Kyle makes up a story about Adam sleeping with a prostitute. Michael becomes despondent and wracked with guilt, and implies that he will turn himself in to the police. Robert, suspecting Lois does not believe them, kills her and frames Michael by luring him to Lois' house, where Michael is in turn killed. Robert concocts a story about a Michael/Lois/Adam love triangle when police interrogate him. After these events and being named a beneficiary of Adam and Lois's estate, Kyle breaks down and confesses the real story to Laura, who demands that her dream wedding proceed as planned.

On the wedding day, Robert confronts Kyle and demands the money from Adam's life insurance policy. Kyle refuses and a fight ensues which ends with Laura bludgeoning Robert. During the ceremony, Kyle and Charles realize that Robert has the wedding rings. When Charles goes to retrieve the rings, he opens a door that knocks Robert down a stairwell to his death. Laura demands Kyle bury Robert's body in the desert and instructs him to tie up loose ends by killing Charles. Kyle buries Robert's body and prepares to bludgeon Charles with a shovel, but ultimately cannot bring himself to kill his friend. The two men drive home together, but Kyle daydreams at the wheel and accidentally crashes into an oncoming car.

After the collision, Kyle's legs are amputated below the knee and Charles is a quadriplegic confined to a motorized wheelchair. Laura is appointed as the caretaker for both of them, in addition to raising Adam and Lois's sons. As Laura watches Kyle with the two boys, it hits her that her life and dreams are totally ruined, prompting her to have a nervous breakdown in which she runs out of the house and collapses screaming in the street.

== Cast ==
- Christian Slater as Robert Boyd
- Cameron Diaz as Laura Garrety-Fisher
- Jon Favreau as Kyle Fisher
- Daniel Stern as Adam Berkow
- Jeremy Piven as Michael Berkow
- Leland Orser as Charles Moore
- Jeanne Tripplehorn as Lois Berkow
- Joey Zimmerman as Adam Berkow Jr.
- Kobe Tai as Tina (as Carla Scott)
- Russell B. McKenzie as Security Guard

== Production ==
Adam Sandler was originally attached to a role in the ensemble cast, but he dropped out to do The Waterboy instead and was replaced by Jeremy Piven.

Very Bad Things was noted for having a very similar plot setup to Stag, a film which originally aired on HBO in June 1997. Director Peter Berg told The A.V. Club in 1998, "See, the first time I'd ever heard about Stag was after I had finished writing the screenplay for Very Bad Things. When we were at the point of getting the film financed, we had a lawyer look over the script and the film to make sure there weren't too many similarities. I mean, there were things we had to change; for example, one of the characters in the movie was a baker, and there was also a baker in our script, so we had to change some very minor things. But as far as I understand it, the two films take very different approaches to the material. I will say this: I think it would be interesting to get, like, three different directors—say, Soderbergh, Spielberg, and Coppola—and have them all tell the same story in a different way."

== Reception ==
On Rotten Tomatoes Very Bad Things has an approval rating of 40% based on reviews from 58 critics, with the consensus, "Mean-spirited and empty". On Metacritic it has a score of 31% based on reviews from 24 critics, indicating "generally unfavorable reviews". Audiences polled by CinemaScore gave the film a grade of "D+" on a scale of A to F.

Criticism was directed toward the film's tone, lack of humor, and graphic scenes of violence and gore. In a review that awarded 1 star out of 4, Roger Ebert said the film "[attempts] to exploit black humor without the control of tone necessary to pull it off." Ebert complimented Slater's performance as well as Diaz’s character and said while the film "isn't bad on the technical and acting level", it is undermined by a pervasive cynicism--"the assumption that an audience has no moral limits and will laugh at cruelty simply to feel hip. I know moral detachment is a key element of the ironic pose, but there is a point, once reached, which provides a test of your underlying values." He also took issue with the script's implications of racial humor.

The Washington Post's Stephen Hunter wrote the film "means to tread that very delicate line between the hysterically funny and the hysterically awful", but, "as blood-spattered as a Jacobean revenge drama, [the film is] simply too literal to inspire much laughter. The idea of death can be funny, the suggestion of it can be funny, but the brute fact of it never can be." He added the movie "becomes a bloody assault on the senses that commingles atrocity with tedium. It offers but a single paltry treasure in recompense: the cheery image of Cameron Diaz pounding Christian Slater's head in with a hat rack."

Kenneth Turan of the Los Angeles Times said, "Unfortunately, writer-director Berg and his cast are much too pleased with themselves for having gone oh so far, being oh so daring, for any of them to realize just presenting a situation is not an end in itself." Marc Savlov of The Austin Chronicle wrote, "The comic moments revolve almost exclusively around pain and violence and degradation, and though that may work well enough in more cerebral films (the Belgian Man Bites Dog comes to mind), here it's simply too much of a very bad thing...There is a line between gallows humor and tastelessness, but Very Bad Things apparently doesn't have a clue where that might be." In a positive review, Maitland McDonagh of TV Guide wrote, "In a world filled with crude movie sitcoms, Berg's bitter, worst-possible-case scenario really does stand alone".

Some critics have viewed the film more favorably in the years since its release. Writing retrospectively about the film for Vulture, Joe Blevins argued the film's strength is "playing on the viewer’s sense of guilt", and how it shows that "given the right circumstances, even upstanding members of mainstream society can be coerced into committing—or at least passively condoning—horrible acts." In Daily Grindhouse, Preston Fassel praised the film as a critique of bro culture, writing "it’s the perfect deconstruction of the responsibility-free bro-comedy, a movie that looks at the real-life consequences of so much 'innocent' bad behavior," comparing its philosophy to the "Homer's Enemy" episode of The Simpsons and calling it "the brilliant anti-comedy we need today."

== Home media ==
Very Bad Things was released on DVD by PolyGram Video on May 18, 1999. On January 28, 2020, Shout! Factory released the film on Blu-ray.

== See also ==
- List of films set in Las Vegas
