= Manhattan Plaza =

Residential complex in Manhattan, New York

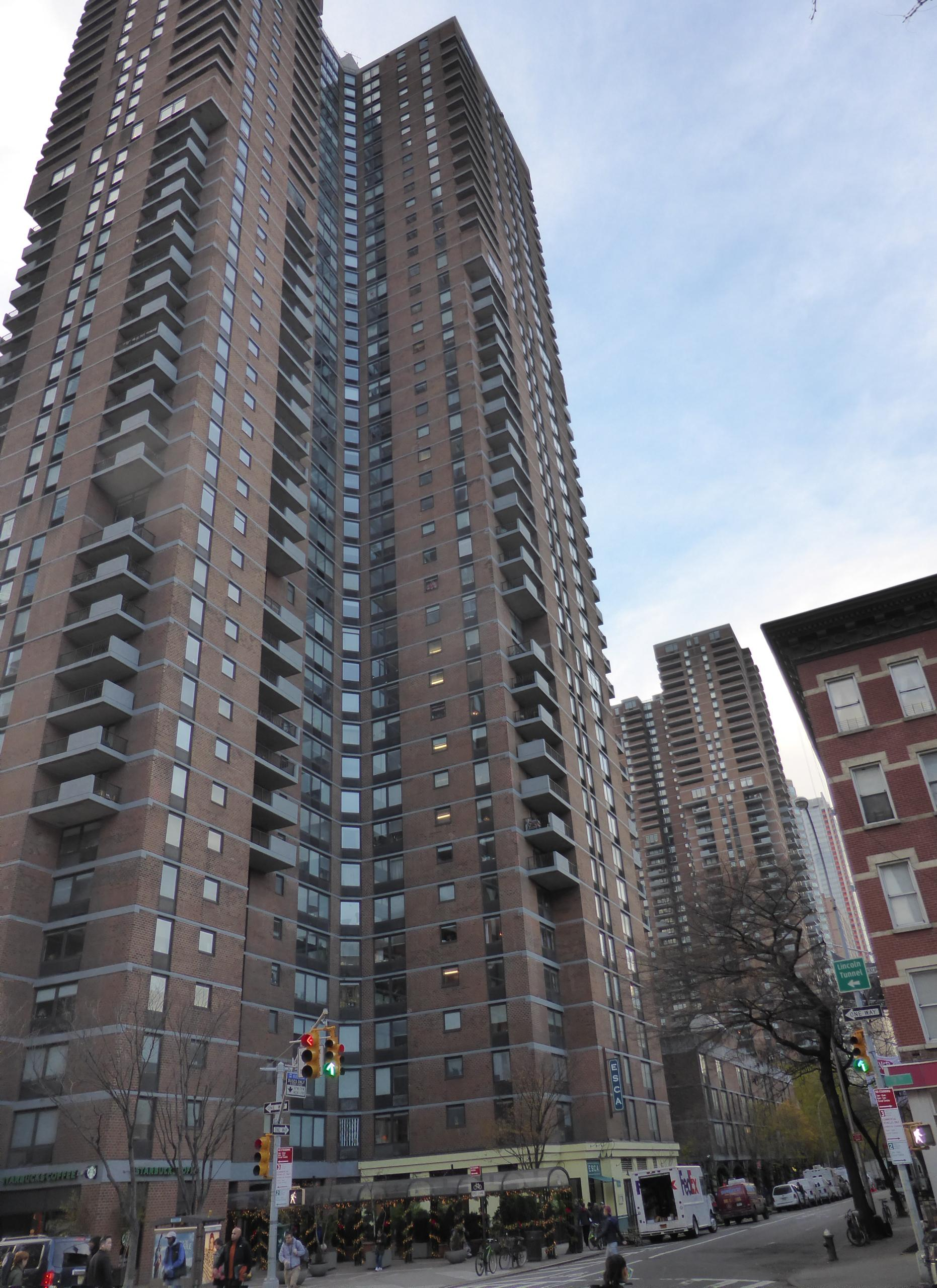
- Manhattan Plaza in 2016

General information
- Location: 400 West 43rd Street; 484 West 43rd Street, New York City, United States
- Coordinates: 40°45′33″N 73°59′34″W
- Construction started: 1974
- Completed: 1977

Height
- Height: 428 ft (130 m)

Technical details
- Floor count: 46

Design and construction
- Architect: David Todd
- Developer: HRH Construction

Manhattan Plaza is a large federally subsidized residential complex of 46 floors and 428 feet (130 m) at 400 and 484 West 43rd Street in midtown Manhattan, New York City. Opened in 1977, it has 1,689 units and about 3,500 tenants. Under its Section 8 federal funding, it is mandated to maintain 70% of the tenants from the performing arts fields, while it chooses to dedicate 15% of turnover to neighborhood residents and 15% to the elderly. It occupies the city block bounded north by 43rd Street, east by Ninth Avenue, south by 42nd Street, and west by Tenth Avenue. Developed by HRH Construction, it has been owned since January 2004 by The Related Companies. Manhattan Plaza is the subject of a documentary titled Miracle on 42nd Street, released in 2017.

== History ==
Construction on this "superblock" development west of Manhattan's Theater District began in 1974 by HRH Construction, a real estate construction and development firm led at the time by Richard Ravitch. The project consisted of two 45-story residential towers at opposite ends of the block designed for middle- and upper-middle class rental tenants, with townhouses, shops, a health club and parking facility in the mid-block, financed with a $95 million mortgage by the City of New York under the New York State Mitchell-Lama Housing Program for middle-income housing. However, during construction, New York City went into a steep recession, and faced with mounting financial difficulties, the city was able to fund only $65 million of its commitment. The financial crisis also affected the city's housing market, and it became apparent that there would be little to no market for the apartments as had originally been planned.

This was in part due to the location of the development in the heart of New York's then rough-and-tumble Clinton neighborhood—historically known as "Hell's Kitchen"—and the rapidly declining environment of the Times Square area, at that point the epicenter of New York's 'adult' and pornographic activities. Manhattan Plaza cleared out the adult businesses on the north side of 42nd Street between 9th and 10th Avenues. At the same time the 42nd Street Development Corporation under the leadership of Fred Papert and with Jacqueline Kennedy Onassis on its board was working on converting the adult stores on the south of 42nd Street between 9th and 10th into Off Broadway theaters now known as Theatre Row.

With no other options available, New York City applied for federal funds under the Section 8 program to re-purpose the project as deeply subsidized housing for poor and moderate-income families. Under Section 8, tenants would pay no more than 30% of their income for rent. The plan aroused widespread, intractable opposition from the surrounding working class community, concerned about a potential influx of thousands of dysfunctional, poor neighbors. At that point, an innovative solution was conceived by Daniel Rose, the real estate developer whose company had been retained to manage the project. Rose had been searching for a tenant population that would meet the income requirements for deeply subsidized public housing, assuage the community's fears about dysfunctional neighbors, and contribute to the revitalization of the Times Square neighborhood. Quoting Mike Todd, who once said that while growing up, his "family had been often broke, but never poor", Rose proposed limiting occupancy in the new project solely to residents who were, or had been, engaged in the performing arts. By seeding the 1,600 apartments with families of actors, musicians, directors, stagehands and others in the entertainment industry, the idea was to fill the project, stabilize the neighborhood, and support the regrowth of legitimate theater in Times Square.

Met at first with skepticism to derision (as no other subsidized housing project had previously been limited by occupation), the idea soon garnered enthusiastic support from the performing arts unions and the City. Peter Joseph, a deputy commissioner of the NYC Housing and Development Administration, said the agency strongly supported the performing arts idea: "It takes what had been an uncomfortable situation and makes it something vibrant and exciting. We think it's innovative and frankly, we're ecstatic about it. We're committed to pulling it off." There continued to be concern from neighborhood residents, but they were allayed to a large extent when a study was published by the Settlement Housing Fund estimating that 100,000 households in New York had members engaged in the performing arts, and about two-thirds of them would be eligible to move into the project under Federal income guidelines:

New York is the nation's incubator city for the theater, since it is where young performing artists from all over the country come to start their careers. By using Federal funds to subsidize housing for the performing arts we are helping the entire country, and we are also solving the economic problems of the Manhattan Plaza project, of the New York theater and of the Clinton neighborhood. We think it can relate closely to the Clinton area's efforts to upgrade itself. We see the idea as part of the neighborhood preservation effort as well as part of the effort to upgrade Times Square and the theater district.

Rose's plan for "Manhattan Plaza for the Performing Arts" was eventually approved with support from the City, the performing arts unions, and the surrounding community, and opened with a Mayoral ribbon-cutting in 1977. 70% of the 1,689 units were reserved for performing arts workers, 15% for elderly and handicapped residents of the surrounding neighborhood, and 15% for existing residents of the neighborhood living in substandard housing. The project quickly filled up, with the waiting list for apartments topping 3,000 names within the first year.

An important factor in the early success of Manhattan Plaza was Rose's recruitment of The Rev. Rodney Kirk as the first Director of the Development. Kirk had been on the staff of the Cathedral of St. John the Divine until 1976, when he was given leave to help with the city's bicentennial celebrations. Tapped to supervise the opening of Manhattan Plaza, Kirk helped set the tone for the development, and organized community support that permitted hundreds of aging neighborhood residents to keep their apartments with their dignity intact. Shortly after Manhattan Plaza opened, the City was hit by the AIDS crisis, and many residents in the performing arts contracted AIDS. To respond to their needs, Kirk established social service programs with paid staff and volunteers, and the help of the Actors' Fund, to care for them and for non-residents. According to health officials, a greater proportion of people have died of AIDS in that apartment complex compared to any other residence building in the country. The Manhattan Plaza AIDS Project Foundation's benefit concert in May 1997 at the Westside Theatre on 43rd Street featured Joseph Bologna and Renée Taylor, Jenny Burton, Vivian Reed; artists in other years included Jeanne MacDonald, Audra McDonald, and Robert Cuccioli.

As HIV/AIDS came under control, the focus of the social services program shifted to the elderly, who are aging in place, and are sometimes unable to care for themselves. Kirk retired in 1997 and died in 2001. His work was continued by General Manager Richard Hunnings, his companion of 42 years. The Rodney Kirk Theatre is now one of the theaters across 42nd Street in the Theatre Row Building.

== Description ==
Manhattan Plaza was designed by architect David Todd.

Aside from the McGraw-Hill Building, the complex was the tallest in the Hell's Kitchen area at the time it was completed, and is still highly visible from the north, south, and west sides. Between the two buildings are a multi-story garage, a fitness center (including a swimming pool), a basketball court, a playground, tennis courts, a wall-climbing center, and a number of shops (including Arnold Wilkerson's Little Pie Company), a Food Emporium branch, restaurants, and a bank.

Located within the Tenth Avenue building is the 43rd St Kids Preschool, which was founded in 1981. It is a private, non-profit, parent cooperative school. More than 1,500 one-act plays including more than 40 by Lewis Black have been staged at the Laurie Beechman Theatre in the West Bank Cafe (where Bruce Willis was a bartender) at the base of the 9th Avenue building.

In the middle of March 2009, the original playground located on the 3rd floor rooftop was taken down in order to build a new playground built by Kompan and sponsored by former football player Tiki Barber. The company was known as Tiki Recreation. It is one of three rare and unique playgrounds. It has an electronic setting and virtual interactive games programmed within the equipment. The park officially opened June 8, 2009.

== Notable people ==
- Muhal Richard Abrams
- Jane Alexander
- Marin Alsop
- Dylan Baker
- Jamie Baum
- Jim Brochu
- Stan Brooks
- Nell Carter
- Timothée Chalamet
- Pauline Chalamet
- Marge Champion
- Chuck Cooper
- Marlon Craft
- Larry David
- Patrick Dempsey
- Colman Domingo
- Giancarlo Esposito
- Donald Faison
- Katie Finneran
- Tom Fontana
- Joshua Frankel
- Mike Freeman
- Ricky Ford whose album Manhattan Plaza shows the building on its cover
- Dexter Gordon
- Gloria Grahame
- John Hicks
- Terrence Howard
- Earle Hyman
- Samuel L. Jackson worked there as security guard
- James Earl Jones
- Rachel Bay Jones
- Alicia Keys
- James Kirkwood Jr.
- Kenny Kramer
- Angela Lansbury
- Mike LeDonne
- Ray Mantilla
- Andrea McArdle
- Thomas Meehan
- Alan Menken
- Charles and Sue Mingus
- Al Pacino
- Tonya Pinkins
- Ram Ramirez
- Roger Rosenberg
- Jim Rotondi
- Mickey Rourke
- Craig Russell
- Steve Schalchlin
- Woody Shaw
- Mary Jo Slater and her sons Christian and Ryan
- Jim Snidero
- John Spencer
- KT Sullivan
- Martha Swope
- Jim Vallely
- Kristen Vigard
- Richie Vitale
- Jack Walrath
- Jack Warden
- Tennessee Williams
