= Monk's Café =

Fictional coffee shop in Seinfeld

Coordinates: 40°48′20″N 73°57′56″W

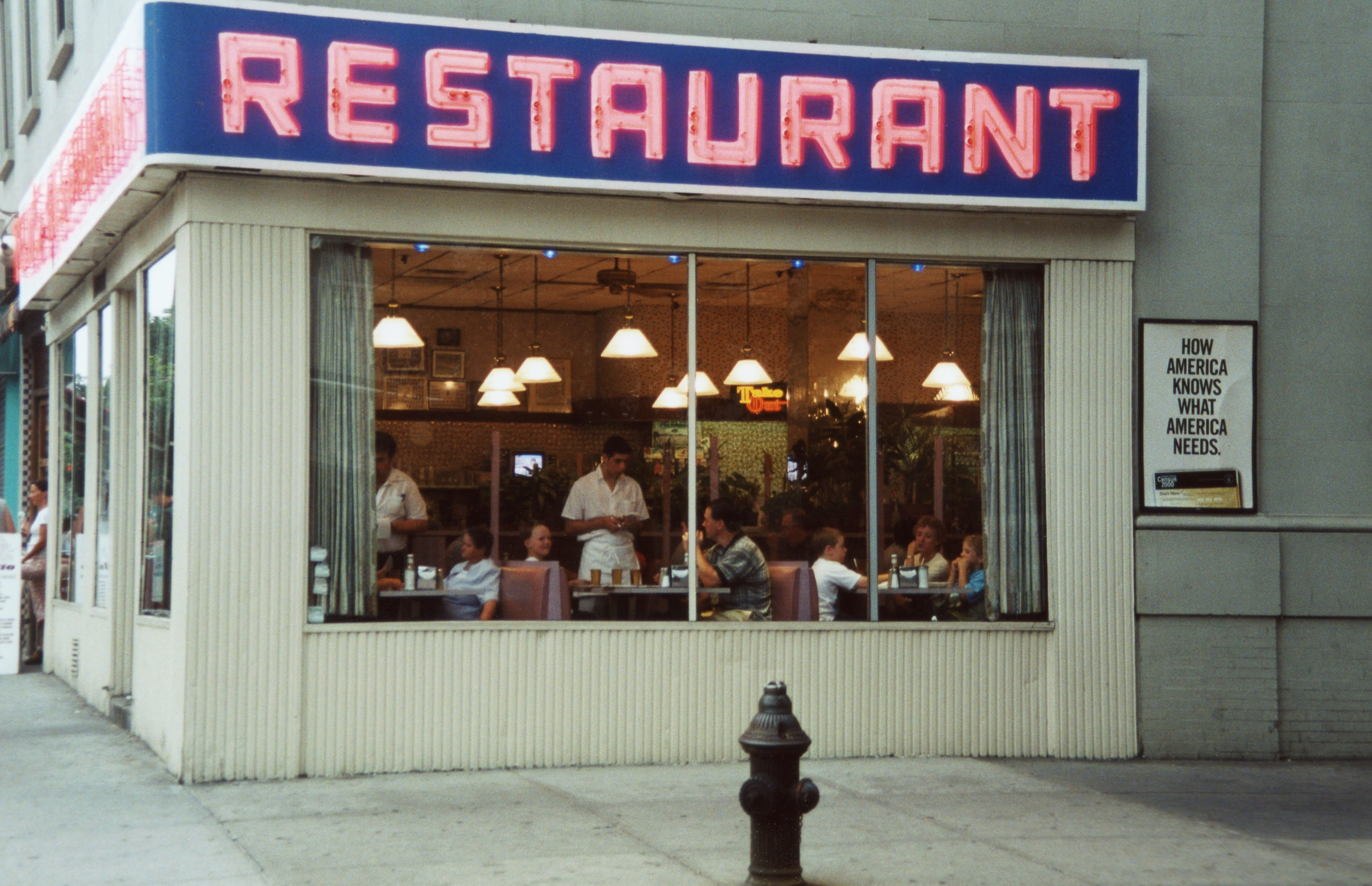
The exterior of Tom's Restaurant, which appears as Monk's Café in the sitcom Seinfeld

Monk's Café is a fictional coffee shop from the NBC sitcom Seinfeld. The exterior of Tom's Restaurant on the corner of West 112th Street and Broadway, near Columbia University, which first appears in season 1 episode 3, "The Robbery," is often shown on the show as the exterior of Monk's, though the interiors were shot on a sound stage. The restaurant consists of a number of booths, tables, and a counter. Jerry, Elaine, George and Kramer normally sit in the first or second booth from the entrance.

The owner of the fictional café is Larry the Cook, played by Lawrence Mandley. He first appears in "The Outing" during season 4. In the season 4 finale, "The Pilot", Elaine is incensed that Monk's "new management" is hiring nothing but big-breasted waitresses. The new owner is identified as Mr. Visaki (played by Al Ruscio) and the well-endowed employees turn out to be his daughters. However, in the season 5 episode, "The Wife", Larry has returned as the owner/manager and appears in that role throughout the remainder of the show's run.

Ruth Cohen plays the cashier at Monk's, identified on screen as "Ruthie". She appears in 101 episodes, the most of any character other than the four leads; most of her appearances are as a non-speaking background character.

Jerry refers to a competing coffee shop, Reggie's, as "the bizarro coffee shop." According to George, it has practically the same menu but is disliked by Jerry and Elaine (in "The Soup") for its failure to serve an "egg white omelette" or the famed "big salad". In "The Pool Guy" George eats at Reggie's because there is no room for him at the table in Monk's, with Susan taking up the fourth spot.

Jerry Seinfeld and writer Larry David, who created Seinfeld, called the coffee shop Monk's because there was a poster of the pianist and jazz musician Thelonious Monk in the office in which they were writing. In the original pilot "The Seinfeld Chronicles," the luncheonette was known as Pete's, and featured a waitress named Claire (played by Lee Garlington); Claire was originally conceived as a regular for the show, but was written out (and Pete's replaced by Monk's) by the time the show went to series, because it was decided that having the female lead be from such a different social status compared to the rest of the cast would be unworkable.

== Employees ==
- Larry the Cook, the owner/manager/cook.
- Ruthie Cohen, the cashier at Monk's, is seen behind the register in most scenes set in the café, and appeared in 101 episodes. In "The Gum" she is seen on a horse, and aggravates George by saying, "Your car's on fire."
- Kelly, a waitress who openly flirts with George in "The Soup". She is turned off by his mentioning an affinity for the word "manure". She is only waitressing to get money to travel to Europe and quits at the episode's end because her handmade hairclips have started selling.
- Paco, a line cook at Monk's. He is alluded to in "The Strike" when George attributes a rubber band in his soup to Paco's cooking.
- The Blonde Waitress, who George is certain is giving him "the finger" by pointing to the menu and scratching her face while talking with him. The actress is Lauren Bowles, the half-sister of Julia Louis-Dreyfus.
- Olive, a cashier whom Kramer dated in "The Pie".
- Babu Bhatt, who worked as a busboy after Jerry helped get him hired in "The Visa".
- A Portuguese waitress with whom George had a brief relationship in "The Abstinence".
- Carlito, an employee who passed out. Elaine’s date Ben, who is not a doctor, tells him to elevate his legs in “The Abstinence”.
