= Miracle on 42nd Street =

- Film poster
- Directed by: Alice Elliott
- Written by: Joal Ryan, Steve Ryfle
- Produced by: Ken Aguado; Mary Jo Slater; Lisa Shreve; Alice Elliot; Erika Lockridge; Joanne Storkan; Nancy McLeod Perkins; Cindy Cowan; Cindy Bond; Eric Small
- Edited by: Arash Ayrom; Elena Toccafondi
- Release date: November 11, 2017 (Doc NYC)
- Running time: 68 minutes
- Country: United States

Miracle on 42nd Street is a 2019 documentary film that delves into the history and impact of the Manhattan Plaza apartment complex in the Hell's Kitchen neighborhood in New York City. The documentary is narrated by Chazz Palminteri and features interviews with people involved with the development of the project as well as previous tenants such as Alicia Keys, Terrence Howard, Donald Faison, Larry David, Samuel L. Jackson (who worked at Manhattan Plaza as a doorman), and many others. It is directed by Alice Elliott, an Academy Award-nominated filmmaker. Mary Jo Slater, the producer, and Lisa Shreve, the consulting editor, are both previous tenants of the building. The film opened in November 2017 at the Doc NYC film festival and premiere on KNET (PBS) in 2019.

The film won Best Feature Documentary at the Franklin International Independent Film Festival. The film won the 2020 New York Emmy Award for Best Documentary. The documentary was released on DVD on January 15, 2020.

== Cast ==
Previous residents

- Larry David
- Giancarlo Esposito
- Donald Faison
- Terrence Howard
- Samuel L. Jackson
- Alicia Keys
- Kenny Kramer
- Angela Lansbury
- Estelle Parsons
- Jim Vallely
- Tannis Vallely
