= Stan Brooks (radio broadcaster) =

American radio broadcaster (1927–2013)

- Born: Stanley Bertram Brooks; January 24, 1927
- Died: December 23, 2013 (aged 86)
- Occupation: American radio broadcaster
- Spouse: Lynn Brooks (married 1953)

Stanley Bertram Brooks (January 24, 1927 – December 23, 2013) was an American radio broadcaster for CBS Radio. Brooks began his career in 1962 at WINS, found in the metropolitan New York City area at 1010 on the AM radio dial. When the decision was made by station owner Westinghouse to take it from a mixed radio and news format to an all-news one, he was enlisted to help organize the transition. The changeover took place on April 19, 1965.

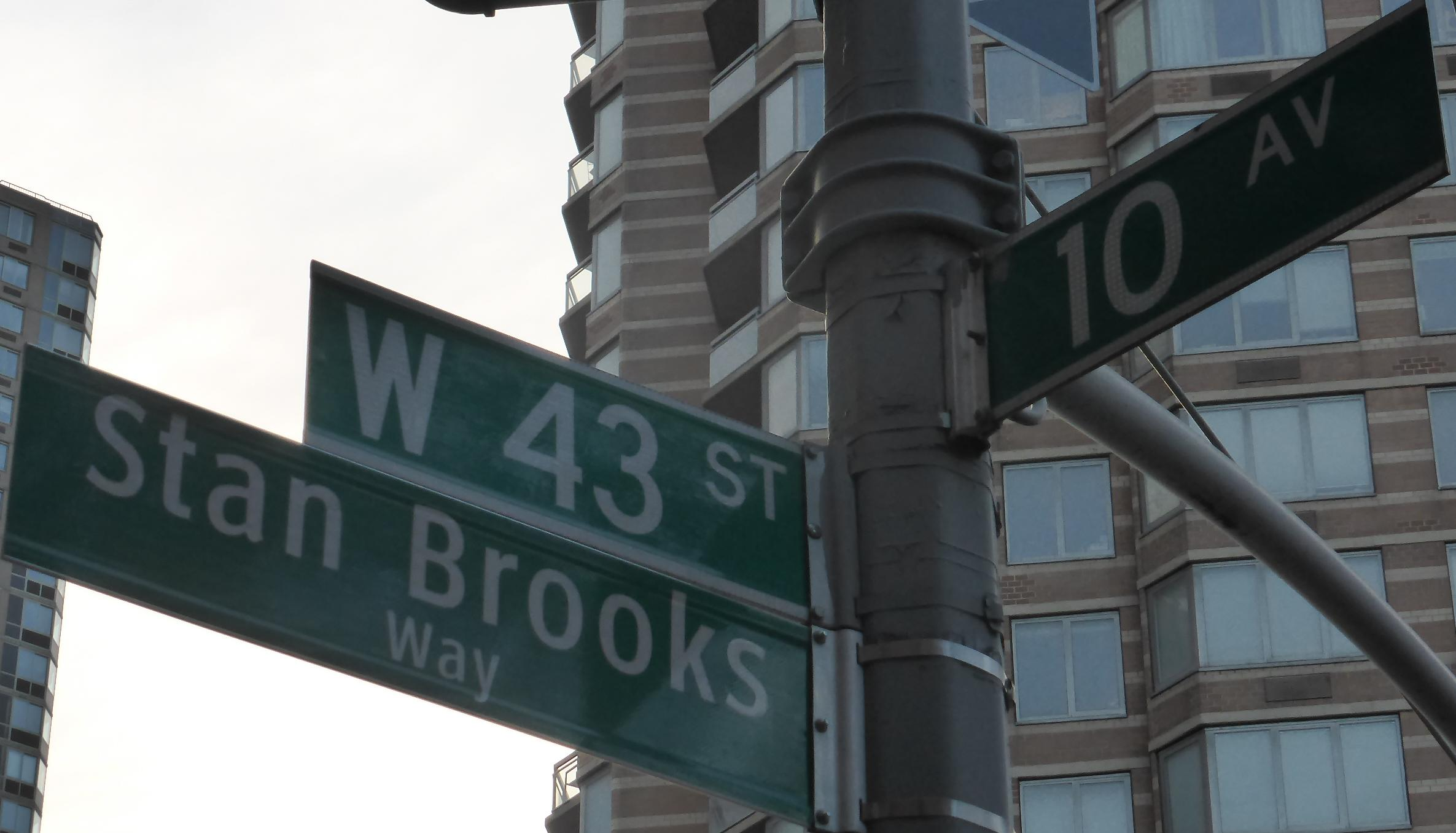
Stan Brooks Way

Brooks next spent several years as an executive and a national reporter for Westinghouse. Then, in 1970, he undertook the role of a local reporter. He continued to be on the air from that time until he filed his last report from City Hall about a month before his death at the age of 86. On December 17, 2013, just a week before his death, Mayor Michael Bloomberg renamed the press room at New York City Hall in his honor. Brooks and his wife had lived at Manhattan Plaza for years, and the corner of Tenth Avenue and 43rd Street was renamed Stan Brooks Way in his honor in September 2014.

Brooks's wife Lynn predeceased him in May 2013. The couple is survived by their three sons George, Rick and Bennett.
