= Art Wolff =

American television director (1938–2020)

- Born: 1938
- Died: November 16, 2020 (aged 82); New York City, U.S.
- Occupation(s): Director, producer and acting coach
- Years active: 1951–2010

Art Wolff (1938 – November 16, 2020) was an American television director and acting coach.

Wolff amassed a number of notable directing credits, directing episodes of The Tracey Ullman Show, It's Garry Shandling's Show, The Powers That Be, Dream On, and most notably the original Seinfeld pilot episode "The Seinfeld Chronicles".

In later years, Wolff directed theatre at a number of venues, as well as taught courses at New York University's Tisch School of the Arts and the Actors Studio.

As an acting coach, Wolff ran an acting studio in Hollywood and worked with Dakota Fanning, Jennifer Love Hewitt, Sean Penn, Matthew Perry, Harry Shearer, Michael McKean, Julie Hagerty, Steve Martin, Brian Benben, and many others.

Wolff died of congestive heart failure at Mount Sinai West in New York City on November 16, 2020; he was 82.
