= The Seinfeld Chronicles =

- Seinfeld episode
- Episode no.: Season 1 Episode 1
- Directed by: Art Wolff
- Written by: Larry David; Jerry Seinfeld
- Cinematography by: George La Fountaine
- Production code: 101
- Original air date: July 5, 1989

Guest appearances
- Lee Garlington as Claire; Pamela Brull as Laura

Episode chronology
← Previous —	Next → "The Stake Out"
- Seinfeld season 1

"The Seinfeld Chronicles" (also known as "Good News, Bad News", "Pilot", "The Premiere", or simply "Seinfeld") is the pilot episode of the American sitcom Seinfeld, which first aired on NBC on July 5, 1989.

The first of the 180 Seinfeld episodes, it was written by show creators Larry David and Jerry Seinfeld and directed by Art Wolff. It introduces three of the show's main cast: the fictionalized version of Seinfeld; his best friend George (Jason Alexander); and neighbor "Kessler", soon to be renamed Kramer (Michael Richards). In this episode, a woman calls on Jerry while she is in town, and George tries to read between the lines before she arrives.

The story line and main characters were inspired by real-life events and people. Though NBC executives were unsure about the show, they, as Warren Littlefield later stated, "all said, 'Ah, what the hell, let's try a pilot on this thing and see what happens'." However, test audiences reacted extremely negatively. Although NBC would still broadcast the pilot to see how audiences and critics reacted, they decided not to order a first season of the show. Castle Rock Entertainment, which produced the pilot (and the subsequent series), had another pilot produced for NBC featuring actress Ann Jillian in her own eponymous series. After The Seinfeld Chronicles' poor reception, the production company turned to Jillian's series, which tested better and had earned a full-season order (it ran a single 13-episode season and was cancelled by the end of 1990).

When The Seinfeld Chronicles aired, it was watched by nearly 11% of American households and received generally positive reviews from television critics, most of whom were disappointed that NBC did not order a first season. Convinced that the show had potential, and supported by the positive reviews, NBC executive Rick Ludwin convinced his superiors to order a four-episode first season (the smallest order in American television history), offering a part of his personal budget in return. The show, renamed Seinfeld, went on to become among the most successful sitcoms in television history.

== Plot ==
At Pete's Luncheonette, Jerry Seinfeld nitpicks George Costanza for choosing a shirt with a high second button. Laura, a woman Jerry met while on tour in Lansing, Michigan, has asked to visit while in NYC. They assume it's a date, but George second-guesses after hearing Laura's exact words. He concludes that she only called Jerry as a backup, and Claire, their waitress, agrees. Since George did not trust Claire to serve him decaf as asked, she pranks him with regular coffee. At the laundromat, George's exasperation over Laura's "signals" finally bursts Jerry's bubble. Bored out of his mind, George stops Jerry's dryer cycle early when Jerry refuses to.

Late at night, Jerry's neighbor Kessler hunts for sandwich meat in Jerry's fridge; spoils a Mets game that Jerry taped; and tears an article out of a magazine that Jerry is reading. Laura suddenly calls and asks for an airport pickup and to stay over. Jerry's hopes are renewed, but he cautiously prepares a spare bed just in case. George, reading between the lines again, is now sure that Laura wants to sleep with Jerry, and he and Kessler reprimand Jerry for accommodating her too much. Kessler's dog bounds in and drinks from Jerry's toilet.

At the airport, George teaches Jerry how to interpret Laura's body language on arrival, but Laura surprises Jerry with a peekaboo from behind, confounding George. Arriving at Jerry's, Laura makes herself comfortable and dims the lights for them to share some wine. They agree to spend another day and night together, and go on a sightseeing boat ride. Despite her friendliness, Jerry suddenly learns that Laura is engaged when her fiancé calls. Unperturbed, Laura suggests that he and Jerry should meet, while Jerry gapes dumbfounded.

== Production ==
=== Conception and writing ===
When they had the idea of doing essentially a conversational show, which was an extension of Jerry's act - I mean, Larry and Jerry shared such a great sensibility, and what was wonderful is you had, this kind of curmudgeonly, misanthropic, dyspeptic Larry David, being pushed through this very accessible, likeable Jerry Seinfeld [...] - it was a marriage made in heaven.

— Rob Reiner

The Seinfeld Chronicles was written as the pilot for the show that would eventually be called Seinfeld, though earlier versions of the script would refer to the program as Stand Up and The Jerry Seinfeld Show. The idea for the show officially started in 1988, after NBC executives had approached comedian Jerry Seinfeld to do a project with the network, upon a suggestion by George Shapiro, Seinfeld's manager at the time. Seinfeld enlisted fellow comedian Larry David to help him develop it, and they wrote a concept for a 90-minute-special (that was to air one weekend in place of Saturday Night Live) about how comedians get their material. However, upon further discussion, Seinfeld felt that the concept could not be sustained for 90 minutes, and the two decided that the project was to become a pilot for a series rather than a special. Developed by NBC executive Rick Ludwin, and produced by Castle Rock Entertainment, it was a mix of Seinfeld's stand-up comedy routines and idiosyncratic, conversational scenes focusing on mundane aspects of everyday life.

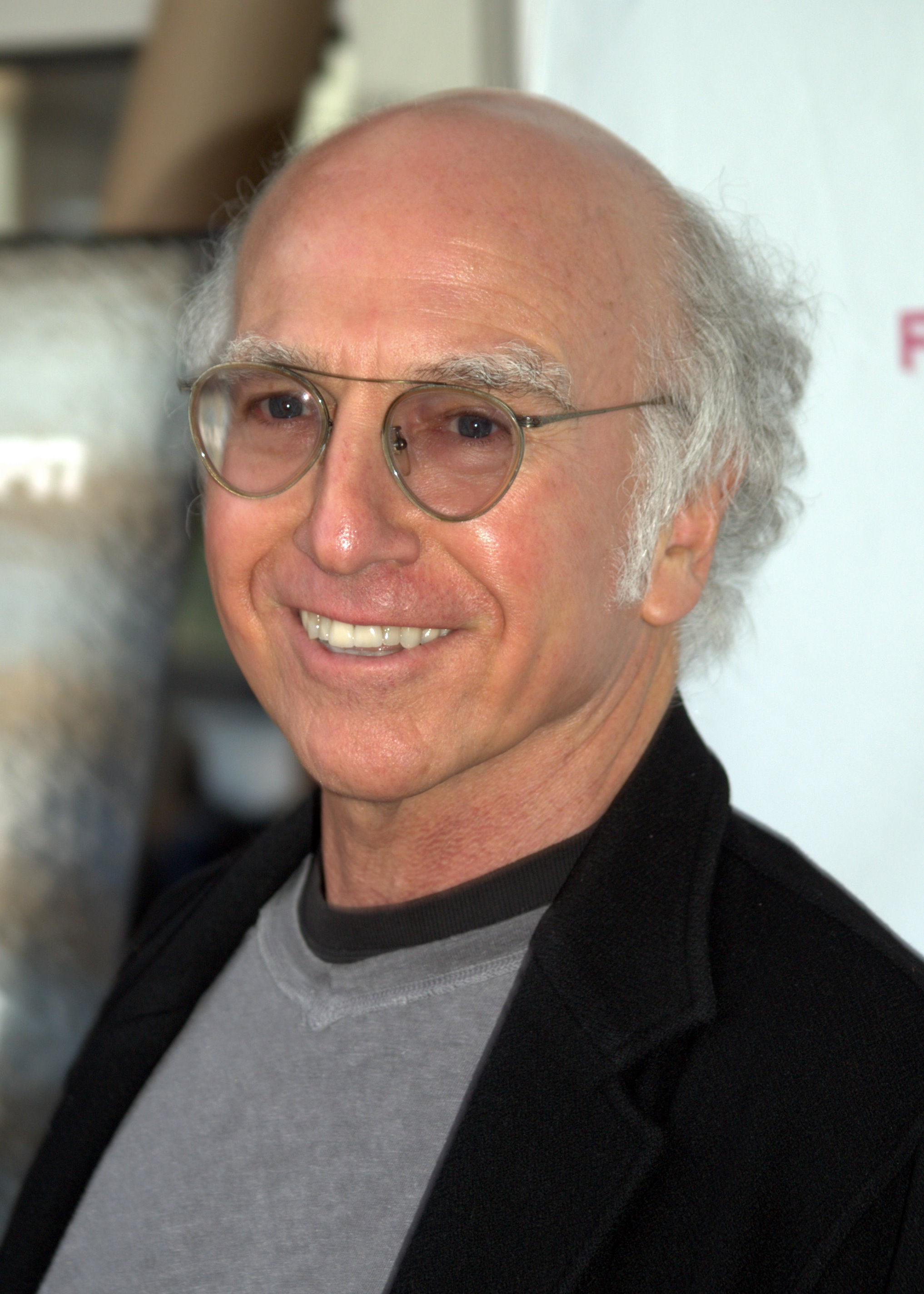
Larry David co-wrote the episode.

Conceived as a "show about nothing," in which the main characters would "just make fun of stuff", Seinfeld said that the idea of the pilot episode was to explore the "gaps in society where there are no rules." The story line, as well as most of the main characters, were inspired by the personal lives of its creators. Jerry was a fictionalized version of Seinfeld, George a fictionalized version of Larry David and Kessler was based on David's neighbor Kenny Kramer. Though Seinfeld was initially concerned the "wacky neighbor" would be too much of a cliché, David convinced him to put the character in the script. However, anticipating that the actual Kramer would exploit the benefits of having a TV character based on him, David hesitated to call the character Kramer. Thus, in the pilot, the character's name is "Kessler". However, intrigued by the name, Seinfeld was convinced that the character's name should be Kramer, prompting Kenny Kramer to call NBC's legal department with various financial and legal demands, most of which he received. The name inconsistency would be referenced in a flashback in the season 9 episode "The Betrayal" in which Jerry mistakes Kramer's name as Kessler, being the name on his apartment buzzer, only to be corrected by Kramer.

David and Seinfeld re-wrote the script several times before submitting it to the network, dropping and adding various elements. Originally George, who was called Bennett in early drafts, was a comedian as well, and the first scene of the episode focused on Jerry and George discussing their stand-up material. The character of Kramer was not included in the first draft of the script; in another draft he is called "Hoffman". Another element that was added was Kessler's dog, since it was originally planned that Jerry's stand-up routines would match the events of each episode. Though the stand-up routine about dogs was eventually dropped, a scene in which Kessler enters with his dog remained in the episode. When David and Seinfeld eventually submitted the script, the network executives were unsure whether or not to produce the pilot, but as NBC executive Warren Littlefield would later state "we all said, ah what the hell, let's try a pilot on this thing and see what happens".

Directed by Art Wolff, the pilot was filmed in front of a live studio audience in April 1989, at Stage 9 of Ren-Mar Studios, the same studio where The Dick Van Dyke Show was filmed, which was seen by the crew as a good omen. The exterior of Pete's Luncheonette, the restaurant in which the episode opens, was a leftover set piece from The Muppets Take Manhattan (1984). Seinfeld's stand-up routine was recorded at Ren-Mar Studios in Hollywood, in front of an audience of paid extras, though not all of the recorded material was included in the broadcast version. Additionally, a scene was recorded featuring Jerry and George driving to the airport talking about changing lanes on the road and giving "Thank you waves", but was cut before broadcasting. The music used in the episode was composed by Jep Epstein; however, when the show was picked up, Epstein's tune was replaced by the trademark slap bass music by Jonathan Wolff.

=== Casting ===
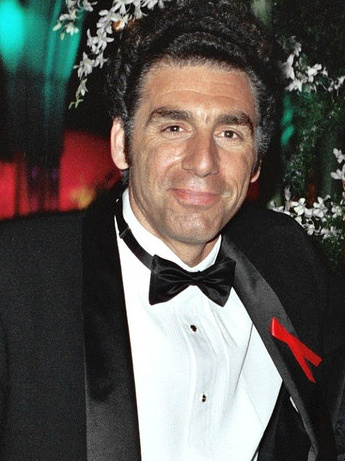
Michael Richards reportedly did a handstand during his audition.

The Seinfeld Chronicles featured four characters that were intended to be series regulars if the show was to be picked up for a first season: Jerry, George, Kramer and Claire the waitress. Though it was already settled that Seinfeld would play a fictionalized version of himself, auditions were held for the other three characters. Though George was based on Larry David, David was keen on writing, and did not have the desire to portray the character himself. Prior to the casting process, Seinfeld pleaded with his friend Jake Johannsen to play the part, but he rejected it. When the casting process started, as casting director Marc Hirschfeld stated, the casting crew "saw every actor [they] could possibly see in Los Angeles". Among these actors were Larry Miller (Seinfeld's real-life best friend), Brad Hall, David Alan Grier, and Nathan Lane yet none of them seemed fit for the part. Stage actor Jason Alexander (who had previously appeared in the failed 1987 sitcom Everything's Relative) auditioned for the part via a video tape, though he had very little hope for being cast, as he felt he was doing a Woody Allen impression. However, upon watching the tape, David and Seinfeld were immediately convinced Alexander would be the right actor to cast. However, casting sessions traditionally work with rounds, so Alexander and a few other actors considered for the role were flown to Los Angeles for a second audition. One of the other actors who made it to this round was Larry Miller. As Alexander knew Miller was a close friend of Seinfeld, he was convinced he would not get the part, but eventually did.

Kenny Kramer initially demanded that he would play the part of Kessler, as he served as the inspiration for the character. However, David did not want this and it was decided that casting sessions would be held. Among those who auditioned or were considered for the part of Kramer were Eugene Levy, Joe Pesci, Dan Hedaya, Harry Dean Stanton, Hector Elizondo, Richard Belzer, Jeffery Tambor, Steve Vinovich and Larry Hankin. Although he was not cast for the part, Hankin would later portray an in-show fictional version of Kramer in the season four episode "The Pilot". Seinfeld and David were both familiar with Michael Richards, and David had worked with him on Fridays. Richards did his final audition at the Century Plaza Hotel on April 18, 1989, reputedly finishing with a handstand. David was not sure about casting Richards, as he was trying to cast an actor who resembled the original Kramer. However, impressed by Richards' audition, Seinfeld convinced David that Richards would be the right actor for the part.

Lee Garlington receives top billing in the opening credits alongside the main cast, playing Claire the Waitress, who in an earlier draft of the episode was called "Meg". Though cast as a series regular, Claire was replaced with Elaine Benes when the series was picked up for a first season. Accounts differ on the reason why the character was replaced. Warren Littlefield has said that it was because of the character's occupation: "I thought that as a waitress she'd never be one of the gang. She'd be relegated to pouring coffee, catching up. So I insisted they create a female character they wanted to spend time with." Dennis Bjorklund of Seinfeld Reference has suggested that the character was dropped in favor of a female character with more sex appeal. However, Alexander said that Garlington was written out of the series because she had re-written her scene and given it to David, who was not happy with this. Seinfeld has, however, stated that this was not the reason the character was removed from the show, but rather that the producers were looking for "someone who was more involved". Julia Louis-Dreyfus, who would go on to replace Garlington, has stated that she was not aware of the pilot before becoming a regular on the show, and she will never watch it out of superstition.

== Reception ==
The pilot was first screened by a group of two dozen NBC executives in Burbank, California in early 1989. Although it did not yield the explosion of laughter garnered by pilots for the decade's previous NBC successes like The Cosby Show and The Golden Girls, it drew mostly positive responses from the executives. One exception was network president Brandon Tartikoff, who was concerned that the show was "Too New York, too Jewish". Before the episode's TV premiere, it was shown to a test audience of 400 households, and met with extremely negative responses. Littlefield later recalled, "In the history of pilot reports, Seinfeld has got to be one of the worst of all time". The memo summarizing the test audience's reactions contained feedback such as "No segment of the audience was eager to watch the show again" and "None of the [supporting characters] were particularly liked". Despite this, and even though the executives had already decided the show would not be picked up for a full season, "The Seinfeld Chronicles" was broadcast on July 5, 1989 to see how viewers would react. It finished second in its time slot, behind the CBS police drama Jake and the Fatman, receiving a Nielsen rating of 10.9/19, meaning that the pilot was watched by 10.9% of American households, and that 19% of all televisions in use at the time were tuned into it. With these ratings, "The Seinfeld Chronicles" finished in the 21st place of the week it was broadcast, tied with Fox's Totally Hidden Video.

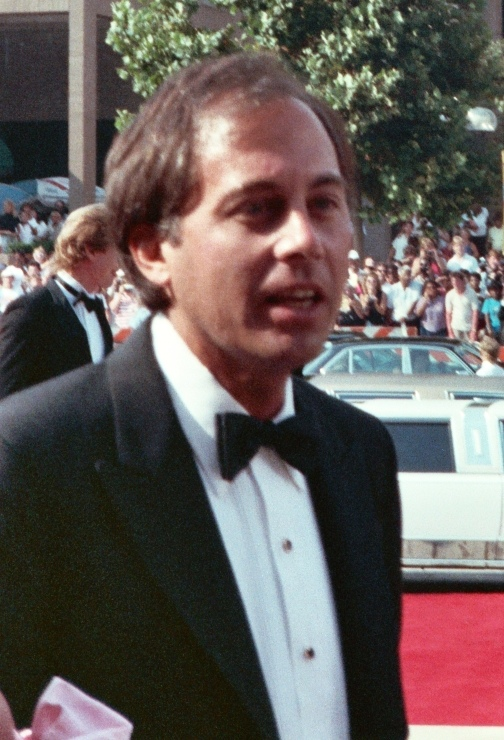
NBC executive Brandon Tartikoff was concerned the show was "Too New York, too Jewish".

Unlike the test audience, television critics generally reacted positively to the pilot, viewing it as original and innovative. USA Today critic Tom Green summarized it as a "crisply funny blend of stand-up routines interwoven with more traditional sitcom stuff". Eric Mink of St. Louis Post-Dispatch wrote that he thought the show was "unusual and intriguing", yet "quite funny". Joe Stein of the San Diego Evening Tribune wrote, "Not all standup comedians fit into a sitcom format, but Seinfeld does". A more negative response came from a The Fresno Bee critic: "I liked the concept, but Seinfeld's jokes were so dull that you hoped the standup stuff would fly by so you could get back to the story". Though the critic praised Alexander's acting, he commented that his performance was not enough to keep the show "from being just another piece of summer drivel offered up by a major commercial network".

Various critics compared the pilot to It's Garry Shandling's Show. In his review, The Philadelphia Inquirer's Ken Tucker commented, "Seinfeld's brisk funniness prevents Chronicles from being a rip-off", while Jerry Krupnick of The Star-Ledger felt that The Seinfeld Chronicles differentiated itself from It's Garry Shandling's Show by its supporting cast, which he praised. By contrast, John Voorhees of The Seattle Times wrote that though he found the show amusing, he considered It's Garry Shandling's Show better, and the Houston Chronicle's Mike McDaniel called it "a not-as-good Garry Shandling-like show".

Most critics reacted with disappointment that NBC had not picked up the show. Bob Niedt of the Syracuse Herald-Journal wrote, "What gives? Comedy this good, and NBC is keeping—excuse me—A Different World on the schedule?" Ken Tucker said, "NBC is making a mistake if it doesn't pick up The Seinfeld Chronicles as a midseason replacement; it's bound to be superior to most of what the network has planned for the fall".

Casting directors Hirschfeld and Meg Liberman were nominated for a Casting Society of America Artios Award for 'Best Casting for TV, Pilot', but lost to the casting directors of Northern Exposure.

Though the network executives had decided not to pick up The Seinfeld Chronicles for a first season, some of them were reluctant to give up on it, as they felt it had potential. Rick Ludwin, one of the show's greatest supporters, eventually made a deal with Tartikoff, giving up some of his own development money and cancelling a Bob Hope special so the entertainment division could order four more episodes of The Seinfeld Chronicles; these formed the rest of the show's first season. It was a very small order for a new series—the smallest sitcom order in TV history—but when Castle Rock failed to sell the series to another network, they accepted the order. The first season premiered about a year later, with the show renamed Seinfeld to avoid confusion with ABC's The Marshall Chronicles. The pilot re-aired on July 5, 1990; it received a Nielsen rating of 13.8/26.
