= Alice Elliott =

American filmmaker

Alice Elliott is an American documentary filmmaker. She is a director, writer, producer, advocate for people with disabilities, and a member of New Day Films, an educational film distribution cooperative. Formerly head of the NYU Documentary Area, she taught film and television production at New York University's Tisch School of the Arts. Elliott received a NY Emmy for Miracle on 42nd Street, and has been nominated for an Academy Award for The Collector of Bedford Street. She is best known as an ally of people with disabilities, creating a style of documentary storytelling that uses immersive, verite footage that reveals the intimate lives of the people in her films.

== Early career ==
Elliott was an actress for over twenty years, appearing in two feature films, over 100 commercials, and had a 10-year recurring role on the ABC daytime drama, Loving. She has produced voiceovers for radio and television. Her writing includes work for the stage, television, and film. From 1994 to 2006 she taught as an adjunct professor at the NYU School of Continuing and Professional Studies while continuing to act and do voiceover work.

== Documentary Filmmaking ==
She established her company, Welcome Change Productions in 1991, and started producing the same year. She co-directed her first documentary, Diamonds in the Rough, an hour-long documentary about a gifted, inner-city high school baseball team in the largely Dominican Washington Heights neighborhood of New York City.

In 1997, Alice Elliott began work on her directorial debut, The Collector of Bedford Street, which she also produced. Since its completion, The Collector of Bedford Street has visited 27 festivals and has won 13 awards. It was nominated for an Academy Award for Documentary Short Subject in 2003.

In 2007, Alice Elliott completed Body & Soul: Diana & Kathy, a rare look at a symbiotic relationship between two people some would call profoundly disabled. Body & Soul: Diana & Kathy was shortlisted for Academy Award consideration and played nationally on PBS.

She received a Guggenheim Fellowship in 2012.

Miracle on 42nd Street, a film about affordable housing for artists, made its world premiere at the DOC NYC Festival in 2017. The film received a National Endowment for the Arts Grant and a 2020 NY Emmy Award for Best Documentary.

She completed Accommodation, three short films about accessibility on college campuses, and directed and wrote a web series of short videos for self-advocates, ACTIVATE HERE! In 2021, she became a member of the Academy of Motion Pictures Arts & Sciences.

In 2023 she completed a short film with editor Julie Sloane called Town Band, that was broadcast on PBS member station WMHT. She also created two public service announcements in sign language to encourage people in the deaf community to get vaccinated. The spots won Bronze and Silver Telly Awards in 2023.

Currently, she is co-directing her fiction film debut, The Dismantled, alongside Emmy Winner Jason DaSilva. She is also the director of Carrie's Blueprint, an upcoming feature-length documentary that uncovers how people with Down syndrome are reshaping the future of Alzheimer's research.
