= Kenny Kramer =

American stand-up comedian

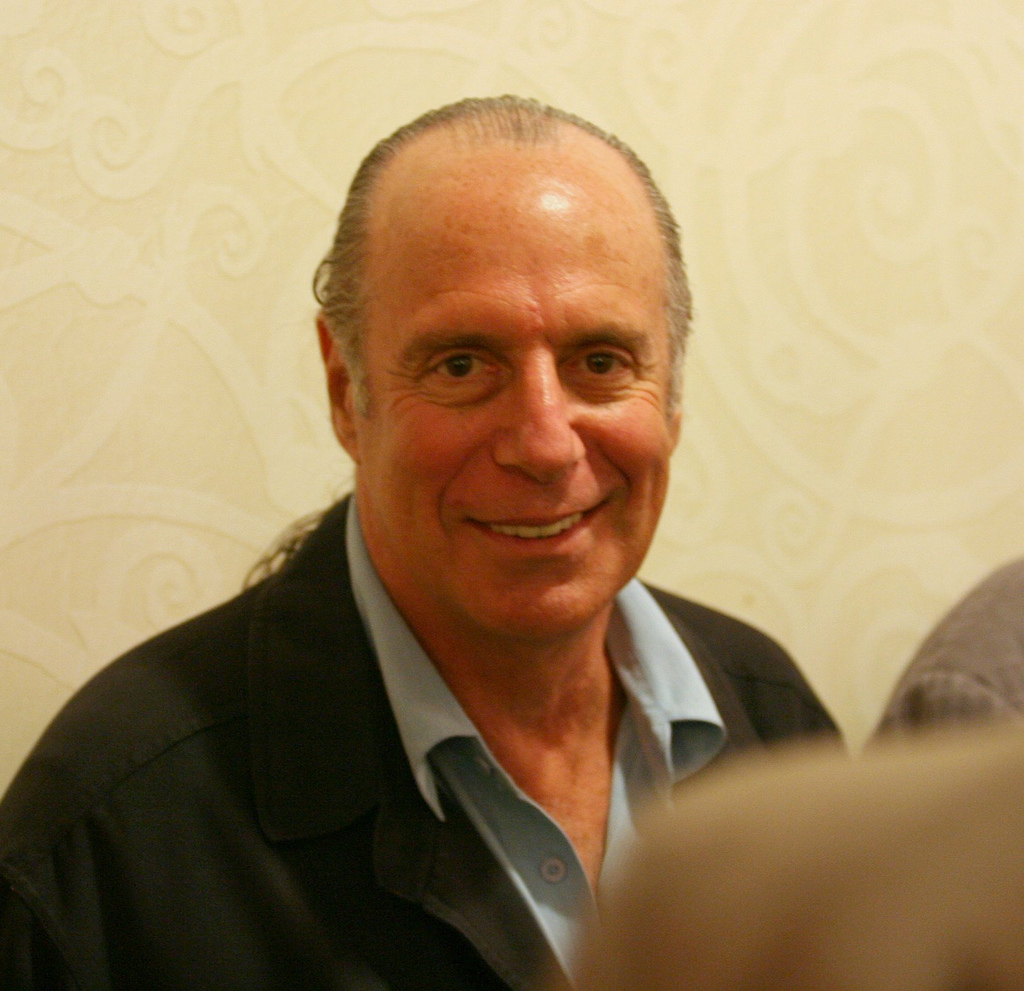
Kenny Kramer in 2007

Kenny Kramer (born May 1943) is an American former stand-up comedian, who was the inspiration for the character of Cosmo Kramer from the television sitcom Seinfeld.

== Early life ==
Kramer grew up in New York City, in the Tremont section of the Bronx, and dropped out of high school at age 17. He sold magazines, played drums in a Catskills resort band, and had a spotty career as a stand-up comedian that lasted until 1981, when he gave up comedy to sell light-up "electronic disco jewelry" in nightclubs for a couple of years.

== Career ==
Kramer sought to manage Bill Beason, a New York point karate champion, with the hopes that the karate tournament scene would develop along the same lines as wrestling had, since corporate sponsors such as Budweiser and Paul Mitchell were emerging.

Seinfeld co-creator Larry David lived across the hall from Kenny for six years, just as the character of Jerry Seinfeld did from Cosmo Kramer in the show. The two lived in Manhattan Plaza, a federally assisted apartment complex for performing artists in Hell's Kitchen, New York City. David said that Kramer was a little bit eccentric and would be a good character to have on the show. Many of the traits of Kenny Kramer, such as the obsessions with golf, fruit, hot tubs, taking things out of the refrigerator and coming up with strange ideas and inventions, were featured in the show.

=== Seinfeld ===
Michael Richards did not want to meet with Kenny Kramer to study the character, preferring to create the character himself. This situation was later parodied in the Seinfeld fourth season episode "The Pilot". The character was originally named "Kessler", due to Larry David's fear that using the name would spur the real Kramer to exploit his association with the character. However, Jerry Seinfeld thought that the name was too good not to use. Kenny Kramer then contacted Castle Rock Entertainment with a list of demands, many of which were financial, for the use of his name. One demand not met was that Kramer himself would get to play the character, which is also parodied in "The Pilot". A later episode, "The Betrayal", provided a tongue-in-cheek explanation for the name change.

Kenny Kramer has been the host of Kramer's Reality Tour and Kramer's Reality Road Show since Seinfeld was on the air. He tells behind-the-scenes stories to his audience and gives a bus tour of sites made famous by the show. A DVD version of his reality tour has also been produced. The "Reality Tours" were later parodied on Seinfeld in the episode "The Muffin Tops", when catalog sales company owner J. Peterman uses Kramer's various stories in Peterman's autobiography. Kramer develops a reality bus tour and touts himself as "The Real J. Peterman." The relationship between Cosmo Kramer and Kenny Kramer is explored in the featurette Kramer vs. Kramer: Kenny to Cosmo, on the 3rd season Seinfeld DVD.

=== Later career ===
After achieving some attention as the inspiration for the character Kramer from Seinfeld, Kramer worked as a correspondent for Hard Copy, created and hosted "Kramer's New York" segments for the Fox New York City affiliate WNYW's Good Day New York, and appeared in the original New York company of Tony n' Tina's Wedding, playing himself. He has made appearances on the bonus features of the Seinfeld DVD series.

In 1997, Kramer attempted to gain the Democratic Party nomination for New York mayor; he claimed that his candidacy was "quite serious," saying that he wanted to represent "a lot of disfranchised Democrats out there." He did not get the nomination. In 2001, Kramer was asked by a television reporter about running again, and he replied that "if Jesse Ventura can be governor, why can't I be mayor?" The next day, the Libertarian Party contacted him to run on its ticket, and he accepted. He cited his agreement with the Libertarian Party on, among other issues, the decriminalization of marijuana. During his run, he claimed that the previous run was "a publicity stunt"; his campaign slogan was "Kramer for mayor... this time I'm not kidding!" He finished seventh out of nine candidates in the election, with 1,408 votes.

== Personal life ==
Kramer is Jewish.

On June 6, 2013, Kramer became an ordained non-denominational minister with the Universal Life Church World Headquarters and was registered with the City Clerk in New York City. While officiating at weddings, he prefers to be called the "Irreverent Kramer" rather than Rev. Kramer, and offers a "customized lifetime warranty" of providing pro bono weddings if the couple divorces.

== Filmography ==
=== Film ===
Year	Title	Role	Notes
2004	Saturday Night Darren and Brose	Self	
2004	Kramer vs. Kramer: Kenny to Cosmo	Self	Documentary short
2017	Miracle on 42nd Street	Self	Documentary

=== Television ===
Year	Title	Role	Notes
1995	Seinfeld	Man #2 in Hockey Audience	Episode: "The Face Painter"
1995	Night Man at the Sardi Building	Parole Board	Video
2004	Seinfeld: How It Began	Self	Television film
2005	Dokument: Humor	Self	Television documentary
2005–2007	Seinfeld: Inside Look	Self	Television documentary
2011	All Night with Joey Reynolds	Self	Episode #1.28
2016	Hayom BaLayla	Self	Episode #1.38
