= Georgeson =

Origin
- Meaning: derived from "Son of George"
- Region of origin: England

Other names
- Variant forms: Giorgi, Di Giorgio, Đorđević, Đurić, Georgiadis, Georgiev, Georgijevičius, Georgiou, Georgiopoulos, Georgopoulos, Gevorgian, Gevorgyan, Gheorghescu, Gheorghiu, Giorgadze, Giorgashvili, Göransson, Jorgensen, Jorissen, Jurevičius, Jurgensen, Jurgenson, Jurewicz, Jurkiewicz, Kevorkian, Kevorkyan, Woldegiorgis, Yurchenko, Yuryev

Georgeson is a surname of English origin. It is a patronymic form of the name George. Notable people with the surname include:

- Charles Christian Georgeson (1851–1931), agronomist, born on Langeland, Denmark
- Chelsea Georgeson (born 1983), Australian surfer who won the world title in 2005
- Noah Georgeson (born 1975), American musician, producer, and solo recording artist
- Roddy Georgeson (born 1948), Egyptian former footballer
- Rosemary Georgeson, Canadian multi-media artist
- Tom Georgeson (1936–2026), British actor, known for his television and film work

== See also ==
- Georgeson Botanical Garden, botanical garden on the University of Alaska Fairbanks campus in Fairbanks, Alaska, US
