= Jorgensen =

Jorgensen or Joergensen (original spelling: Jørgensen, Danish pronunciation: [ˈjɶɐ̯ˀn̩sn̩]) is a common Danish-Norwegian patronymic surname meaning "son of Jørgen" (Danish version of the Greek Γεώργιος (geōrgios), cf. English George).

In 2009, Jørgensen was the tenth most common surname in Denmark, shared by about 1.8% of the population. It is also the 22nd most common surname in Norway. Scandinavian immigrants to English-speaking countries often changed the spelling to Jorgensen or Jorgenson in order to accommodate English orthographic rules. Similarly, mass media in English often render Jørgensen as Jorgensen.

Notable people with the surname Jorgensen or Jørgensen include:

- Arndt Jorgens (born Arndt Jørgensen; 1905–1980), Norwegian-American baseball player
- Adolf Ditlev Jørgensen (1840–1897), Danish historian
- Albert N. Jorgensen (1899–1978), American academic administrator
- Andy Jorgensen (born 1967), American politician, Wisconsin State Assembly
- Anker Jørgensen (1922–2016), Danish politician, prime minister three times in the 1970s
- Ann Eleonora Jørgensen (born 1965), Danish actress
- Annie Jorgensen (1886–1956), American politician
- Astrid Jorgensen, New Zealand-Australian vocalist, conductor and composer
- Ben Jorgensen, American singer and guitarist
- Bertha Jorgensen (1904–1999), Australian violinist and concertmaster
- Bill Jorgensen (1927–?), American television anchor
- C.V. Jørgensen (born 1950), Danish rock musician and songwriter
- Charlotte Jørgensen (born 1972), Danish ballroom dancer
- Christine Jorgensen (1926–1989), American transgender woman
- Claus Jørgensen (born 1974), Danish race walker
- Claus Bech Jørgensen (born 1976), Faroese footballer and coach
- Danny Jorgensen (born 1951), American professor of religious studies
- Dan Jørgensen (born 1975), Danish politician
- Daniel Jorgensen (disambiguation), multiple people
- Dick Jorgensen (1934–1990), American football official
- Ejler Andreas Jorgensen (1838–1876), Danish artist
- Ellen Jørgensen (1877–1948), Danish historian
- Emil Jørgensen (1882–1947), Danish footballer
- Emil Peter Jørgensen (born 1995), Danish footballer
- Erik M. Jorgensen, American biologist
- Eugen Jørgensen (biologist) (1862–1938), Norwegian botanist and marine biologist
- Geir Hansteen Jörgensen (born 1968), Swedish television and film director
- Gwen Jorgensen (born 1986) American professional triathlete
- Henrik Jørgensen (disambiguation), multiple people
- Ian Jorgensen, New Zealand music promoter and photographer
- Janel Jorgensen (born 1971), American swimmer
- Jan Ø. Jørgensen (born 1987), Danish badminton player
- Jeffrey Preston Jorgensen (born 1964), American businessman (most widely known as Jeff Bezos), founder, CEO, and president of Amazon.com
- Jim Jorgensen (born 1948), American businessman
- Jo Jorgensen (born 1957), American politician
- Johannes Jorgensen (1866–1956), Danish religious writer
- Jørgen Jørgensen (1780–1841), Danish adventurer
- Joseph Jorgensen (1844–1888), American politician
- Kenneth Jørgensen (born 1976), Danish handballer
- Kenneth Jørgensen (curler) (born 1984), Danish curler
- Karina Jørgensen (born 1988), Danish badminton player
- Lars Jorgensen (born 1970), American swimmer and college coach
- Lars Fruergaard Jørgensen (born 1966), Danish businessman
- Line Jørgensen (born 1989), Danish handball player
- Martin Jørgensen (born 1975), Danish football (soccer) player
- Mathias Jørgensen (born 1990), Danish football player, nicknamed Zanka
- Michael Jorgensen (born 1974), Canadian filmmaker and producer.
- Michael Knakkergaard Jørgensen (1967-1999), Danish mountaineer
- Mikael Jorgensen (born 1972), American keyboardist for Wilco
- Mike Jorgensen American football quarterback in 1980s and radio commentator
- Mike Jorgensen (born 1948), American baseball player
- Nicolai Jørgensen (born 1991), Danish footballer
- Nils Jørgensen (1911–1996), Norwegian fencer
- Oluf Kavlie-Jørgensen (1902–1984), Norwegian chess player
- Paul Jorgensen, South African advocate
- Pete Jorgensen (born 1935), American politician
- Peter Jörgensen (1870–1937), entomologist
- Rasmus Wejnold Jørgensen (born 1989), Danish pole vaulter
- Richard A. Jorgensen (born 1951), American molecular geneticist
- Sophus Mads Jørgensen (1837–1914), Danish chemist
- Spider Jorgensen (1919–2003), American baseball player
- Sven Erik Jørgensen (1934–2016), Danish environmental engineer
- Tage Jørgensen (1918–1999), Danish fencer
- Thomas Jørgensen, multiple people
- Tor Berger Jørgensen (born 1945), Norwegian Lutheran bishop
- Troels Jørgensen, mathematician
- Wagner Jorgensen (1913–1977), American football player
- William Kvist Jørgensen (born 1985), Danish football player
- William L. Jorgensen (born 1949), American chemist

== See also ==
- Jorgensen, Joergensen, Jurgensen, Jürgensen, Jorgenson, Jurgenson
