= Đorđević =

- Pronunciation: d͡ʑɔ̝̌ːrd͡ʑe̞vit͡ɕ

Origin
- Origin: Serbian
- Meaning: "son of George"
- Region of origin: Former Yugoslavia (Medieval Serbia)

Other names
- Related names: DiGiorgio, Đorđić, Đorđev, Đurić, Đurović, Đurovski, Georgeff, Georgeson, Georgiev, Georgievski, Georgijevičius, Georgiou, Georgiopoulos, Georgopoulos, Gevorgyan, Gevorkyan, Georgescu, Gheorgheff, Gheorghescu, Gheorghiu, Giorgadze, Giorgashvili, Göransson, Györfi, Győrffy, Heorhiyenko, Jerzowicz, Jørgensen, Jorissen, Jürgensen, Jürgenson, Jurajić, Jurić, Kevorkian, MacDheòrsa, MacGeorge, Yurchenko, Yuryev

Đorđević (Serbian Cyrillic: Ђорђевић, pronounced [d͡ʑɔ̝̌ːrd͡ʑe̞vit͡ɕ]; also transliterated Djordjevic) is a Serbian surname, a patronymic derived from the given name Đorđe ("George", from Ancient Greek Georgios meaning "farmer"). It is predominantly worn by ethnic Serbs, an Eastern Orthodox Christian people.

Đorđević is the fifth most frequent surname in Serbia.

It may refer to:

== Notable people ==
- Aleksandar Đorđević (born 1967), Serbian professional basketball coach and former player
- Aleksandar Đorđević (footballer) (born 1968), football coach and former player
- Bora Đorđević (1952–2024), Serbian singer, songwriter and poet
- Boriša Đorđević (born 1953), retired Serbian football player
- Borivoje Đorđević (born 1948), retired Serbian football player
- Boško Đorđević (1953–2026), retired Serbian football player
- Damien Djordjevic (born 1984), French figure skater
- Dragan Đorđević (born 1970), presidential candidate in the Serbian presidential election, 2004
- Filip Đorđević (born 1987), Serbian football player
- Jovan Đorđević (1826–1900), founder of the Novi Sad Serbian National Theatre and the National Theatre in Belgrade
- Kristijan Đorđević (born 1976), retired Serbian football player
- Marko Đorđević (footballer) (born 1983), Serbian football player
- Marko Đorđević (skier) (born 1978), Serbian alpine skier
- Milan Đorđević (born 1968), Serbian slalom canoer
- Milica Đorđević (born 1984), Serbian composer
- Nataša Đorđević (born 1974), Serbian singer
- Nebojša Đorđević (born 1973), Serbian tennis player
- Nenad Đorđević (born 1979), Serbian football player
- Predrag Đorđević (born 1972), retired Serbian football player
- Puriša Đorđević (1924–2022), Serbian film director and screenwriter
- Sanja Đorđević (born 1969), Montenegrin singer
- Saša Đorđević (footballer) (1981–2025), Serbian football player
- Slavoljub Đorđević (born 1981), Serbian football player
- Tatjana Đorđević (born 1985), Serbian singer
- Vladimir Đorđević (born 1982), Serbian football player
- Vlastimir Đorđević (born 1948), former Serbian colonel general
- Zoran Đorđević (football manager) (born 1952), Serbian football manager
- Zoran Đorđević (politician) (born 1970), Serbian politician and former Minister of Defense (2016–2017)

== See also ==
- Đurđević (disambiguation), a surname
- Đorđić, a surname
