= Gevorgyan =

Gevorgyan or Gevorgian, sometimes also spelled Gevorkian (Armenian: Գևորգյան) is an Armenian surname meaning "son of Gevorg", the equivalent of "son of George" (compare English Georgeson). The Western Armenian equivalent is Kevorkian.

Gevorgyan can refer to the following people:

== Persons ==
=== Gevorgian ===
- Kirill Gevorgian (born 1953), a Russian jurist and diplomat

=== Gevorgyan ===
- Ara Gevorgyan (born 1960), an Armenian musician
- Arayik Gevorgyan (born 1973), an Armenian Freestyle wrestler
- Armen Gevorgyan (born 1973), an Armenian politician
- Arsen Gevorgyan (born 1975), an Armenian judoka
- Artur Gevorgyan (born 1975), an Armenian-American boxer
- Edgar Gevorgyan (born 1982), an Armenian weightlifter
- Elmira Gevorgyan (1932–2025), an Armenian physician
- Eva Gevorgyan (born 2004), a Russian-Armenian classical pianist
- Maria Gevorgyan (born 1994), an Armenian chess player
- Mark Gevorgyan (born 2005), an Armenian footballer
- Nahapet Gevorgyan (born 1957), an Armenian politician
- Pavel Gevorgyan (born 1963), a Russian scientist
- Tereza Gevorgyan (born 1988), Armenian soprano
- Vahan Gevorgyan (born 1981), an Armenian-born Polish footballer

== Institutions ==
- Gevorkian Theological Seminary, theological school-college of the Armenian Apostolic Church founded by Catholicos Gevork IV in 1874 and located in the city of Vagharshapat (Echmiadzin), Armenia

== See also ==
- Gevorkyan
- Kevorkian (disambiguation)
