= Georgiadis =

Georgiadis is a Greek patronymic surname meaning "the son of George".

There are variations of the surname: The male version (Γεωργιάδης) can be spelled as 'Georgiadis' or 'Georgiades' and there are two female versions (Γεωργιάδη or Γεωργιάδου) spelled as 'Georgiadi' or 'Georgiadou'.

Notable people with this surname include:

== Men ==
- Adonis Georgiadis, Greek politician (deputy minister) (born 1972), publisher and author
- Constantinos Georgiades (born 1985), Greek Cypriot footballer
- Costa Georgiadis (born 1964), Greek Australian TV personality
- Gabriel Georgiades (born 1957), Greek American professor
- Georgios Georgiadis (disambiguation), several people
- Harris Georgiades (born 1972), Greek Cypriot economist and politician
- Ioannis Georgiadis (1876–1960), Greek fencer
- John Georgiades (born 1966), Greek Australian rules footballer
- John Georgiadis (1939–2021), British orchestral conductor
- Nicholas Georgiade (1923–2001), Greek American film actor
- Nicholas Georgiadis (1923–2001), Greek painter, stage and costume designer
- Nico Georgiadis (born 1996), Swiss chess grandmaster
- Soulis Georgiades (1934–1997), Greek film producer
- Thrasybulos Georgiades (1907–1977), Greek musicologist working in Germany
- Vasilis Georgiadis (1921–2000), Greek film director

== Women ==
- Katerina Georgiadou (born 1982), Greek fashion model
- Margo Georgiadis, Greek American business executive, CEO of Mattel
