= Jurewicz =

Jurewicz is a Polish-language surname. It is related to surnames in other languages:

Language	Masculine	Feminine
Polish	Jurewicz ([juˈrɛvit͡ʂ])	
Belarusian (Romanization)	Юрэвіч (Jurevič, Yurevich)	
Latvian	Jurevičs	Jureviča
Lithuanian	Jurevičius	Jurevičienė (married); Jurevičiūtė (unmarried)
Russian (Romanization)	Юревич (Yurevich, Iurevich)	
Ukrainian (Romanization)	Юревич (Yurevych, Iurevych, Jurevyč)	

== People ==
- Bryan Jurewicz, American football player
- Chodko Jurewicz (fl. 1422–1447), Lithuanian nobleman
- Chris Jay born Chris Jurewicz
- Mike Jurewicz (born 1945), American baseball player
- Theodore Jurewicz (born 1953), Polish-American Orthodox old-rite priest and artist specializing in painting Byzantine icons and frescoes
- John Jurewicz, son of Theodore and Polish-American artist specializing in painting Byzantine icons and frescoes.
