= The Butter Shave =

- Seinfeld episode
- Episode no.: Season 9 Episode 1
- Directed by: Andy Ackerman
- Written by: Alec Berg & Jeff Schaffer & David Mandel
- Production code: 901
- Original air date: September 25, 1997

Guest appearances
- Wayne Knight as Newman; Steve Hytner as Bania; Patrick Warburton as David Puddy; Gordon Jump as Thomassoulo; Kristin Davis as Jenna; Everett Greenbaum as McMaines; Connie Sawyer as Old Woman; Matthew Fonda as NBC Executive; Chris Parnell as NBC Executive; Frank Van Keeken as Vegetable Lasagna; Shannon Whirry as Cute Girl; Nancy Balbirer as Woman; Erica Y. Becoat as Stewardess; Torsten Voges as Cab Driver; George Georgiadis as Cab Driver; Brian Callaway as Passenger

Episode chronology
← Previous "The Summer of George"	Next → "The Voice"
- Seinfeld season 9

"The Butter Shave" is the 157th episode of the NBC sitcom Seinfeld. It is also the first episode of the ninth and final season. It aired on September 25, 1997. In this episode, George gets a new job and preferential treatment due to his co-workers mistakenly thinking he has a physical disability, Kramer rubs butter all over his body and accidentally burns it into his skin, and Elaine and David Puddy break up at the tail end of a European vacation, forcing them to endure an uncomfortable transatlantic flight together.

== Plot ==
Over the summer George, Jerry, and Kramer grew mustaches; they admit it was a bad idea, and shave them off. Not fully recovered from "The Summer of George", George is using a cane to get around. He gets a job with a playground equipment company, Play Now. They think he is disabled due to his use of the cane and are afraid of appearing prejudiced. George takes full advantage after they offer him his own disabled bathroom.

Jerry has another shot at an NBC pilot through an appearance on an NBC Showcase. He is annoyed that hack comic Kenny Bania's act is flourishing, attributing it to the fact that Bania's act always follows his, which warms up the audience. Bania also starts dating one of Jerry's ex-girlfriends.

While returning from a month-long vacation in Europe, on the long flight Elaine and David Puddy break up, get back together, and break up again. The man seated next to Elaine, Magnus, is exhausted by Elaine and Puddy's arguments. When they land in New York, there is a taxi cab shortage, so Elaine is forced to share a cab with Puddy and Magnus.

Kramer finds butter is better than shaving cream. His skin feels so good after shaving with butter, he takes to spreading it all over his body. He falls asleep as he lies out in the sun, and the butter burns into his skin. Newman finds the smell of a buttered Kramer appetizing. While getting ready for a shave, George slips on spilled shaving cream and sprains his good leg. He begins favoring the other leg. Thinking he is losing the use of both legs, Play Now buys him a mobility scooter. While riding it, George bumps an old man's scooter. A mob of elderly people chase George's cart with their own. With his scooter battery dying, George picks up his scooter and runs. His boss sees him. Now concerned about what will happen to his job, George is caught by the scooter owner, who hits George with his cane.

Informed that Bania is going to follow him on the NBC showcase, Jerry sabotages his own act so that Kenny's act will also bomb. Newman meets Kramer backstage. After Kramer has oregano and Parmesan cheese spilled on him, Newman attempts to eat him. The two run onto the stage. Thinking this is part of Bania's act, impressed NBC executives offer Bania a pilot on NBC.

== Production ==
Elaine's European vacation was written into the episode because actress Julia Louis-Dreyfus was on maternity leave and would not be back in time to shoot scenes with the rest of the regular cast. Over the summer break, multiple Seinfeld staff members had broken up with their long-term lovers during overseas vacations, inspiring the direction for the Elaine story.

The exterior shots were filmed on August 25, 1997. The majority of the episode's scenes were then filmed live before a studio audience on August 27. The scenes with Elaine were filmed on September 6.

The rooftop scene where Kramer is discovered to have butter burned into him was filmed atop the CBS Studio Center commissary building, with a cityscape background added in post-production. The shot of Kramer as a cooked turkey was accomplished by shooting actor Michael Richards lying on a table, then using a blue screen to superimpose a real turkey, with a string tied around its wing and then pulled to make it "wave".

The episode is dedicated to the memory of Brandon Tartikoff, NBC's President of Entertainment from 1981 to 1991, who died on August 27, 1997 (the same day the live audience portions of the episode were filmed) at the age of 48 after lifelong complications from Hodgkin's lymphoma. Tartikoff championed Seinfeld in the rocky early days of its run.
