= Caradog Jones =

Welsh mountaineer

John Caradoc Jones or "Crag" Jones (born 1962) is a Welsh mountaineer.

On 23 May 1995, Jones became the first Welshman to reach the summit of Mount Everest (and the 724th overall). Jones was part of a larger expedition led by British climber Henry Todd, but he made his ascent from the Tibetan side (i.e. north east ridge) as part of a lightweight pairing with Michael Knakkergaard Jørgensen, the first Dane to summit Everest; the pair had spent 10-weeks acclimatising.

Jones has climbed all over the world, and has made a diverse range of first ascents including with Mick Fowler on Hunza Peak in Pakistan (1991), with Fowler again with Yes, Please (E3 6a) on Yesnaby Castle sea-stack in Orkney (1996), and a solo climb of the highest peak of Three Brothers, South Georgia (2001). Jones has also undertaken exploratory expeditions, such as in 2005 with Julian Freeman-Attwood, Rich Howarth, and Skip Novak, when they completed a 17-day south–north traverse of South Georgia, which also included a first ascent of Peak 5680.

Jones was born and raised in Pontrhydfendigaid, a village near Tregaron, Ceredigion, in Wales. In 1982, he graduated with a degree in marine biology at Bangor University, and in-between climbing expeditions, Jones has worked in fisheries including in the Falklands and in South Georgia. He now lives with his wife and children in Helsby, Cheshire, working as a freelance fisheries consultant. He was awarded an honorary doctorate by Bangor University in 2023 for Sporting Achievements.

== See also ==
- Timeline of climbing Mount Everest
- List of 20th-century summiters of Mount Everest
