= Henry Todd (mountaineer) =

Scottish mountaineer and drug dealer (1945–2025)

Henry Barclay Todd (2 March 1945 – 3 November 2025) was a Scottish drug dealer, mountaineer and climbing expedition organiser. He played a central role, during the 1970s, in one of the world's largest LSD manufacturing operations. This drugs ring was broken up by Operation Julie and he was sentenced to 13 years of imprisonment, serving seven. After his release, he became one of the pioneers of commercial expeditions to Mount Everest and other Himalayan peaks over the twenty-year period from 1995.

== Early life ==
Todd was born in Broughty Ferry, Scotland, on 2 March 1945, one of three sons to May (née Brown) and Henry Todd. His father's job as an officer in the RAF meant that the family soon moved to Singapore where he spent most of the first 14 years of his life. The family later returned to Dundee and then moved to Cambridgeshire where Todd finished his schooling.

In Cambridge he enrolled at the Cambridgeshire College of Arts and Technology (CCAT), now part of Anglia Ruskin University. He did not complete his studies at CCAT but whilst there he became friends with fellow students David Gilmour and Syd Barrett who later founded Pink Floyd. In the mid 1960s, he worked as an orderly at Addenbrooke's Hospital and in 1968 he spent six months working for a London firm of insurance brokers. When he was arrested in 1970 he was a self-employed systems accountant, based in the Cambridgeshire village of Over.

== Drug dealing and Operation Julie ==
In the late 1960s and early 1970s, Todd was involved in the Cambridge drug scene. His girlfriend modelled for the artist Odile Crick, the wife of biologist Francis Crick, and was invited to parties thrown by the Cricks; he gave LSD to Francis Crick on several occasions in 1967/1968. Todd was arrested in 1970 for the possession of LSD, mescaline and cannabis when a van he was travelling in was stopped but the conviction was overturned on the technicality that there was no evidence to indicate which of the van's seven occupants was the owner of the drugs. He had a prior conviction for possessing cannabis and had been held in Oxford prison from Nov 1966–Feb 1968 after being convicted of theft and obtaining money by false pretences following his arrest for cheque offences in 1966.

In 1970, he first became involved with a drugs ring came to produce and distribute LSD on an industrial scale and he soon became one of the group's ringleaders. At its peak the group was thought to have been supplying around 90% of the LSD in the UK. The drug ring was the subject of a major police investigation, Operation Julie, and in March 1977 Todd was one of many people arrested.

He was enlisted by American David Solomon, who moved to Europe shortly after the 1966 amendment of the Federal Food, Drug, and Cosmetic Act which made LSD a controlled substance in the US. He arrived in Cambridge in 1968 where he enlisted a chemist, Richard Kemp, to work on the production of LSD. Todd met Solomon at a party in the area in 1970, and agreed to manage the distribution chain for the LSD being produced by Solomon and Kemp. By 1973, Kemp and Solomon had fallen out with Todd, who created his own production system with chemicals from Switzerland. With the help of chemist Andy Munro, they produced LSD at a lab in a house in Hampton Wick, London; Todd managed distribution in the UK and worldwide.

By the time they were caught, between 20 and 60 million doses of LSD had been produced. At the trial, Todd, who was described by the Crown as the "Marketing Manager" of the group, was represented by Michael Mansfield. Todd pleaded guilty to conspiring to possess, produce and supply LSD, possession of LSD with intent to supply and conspiring to aid and abet its possession by others. On 9 March 1978, he was sentenced to 13 years' imprisonment. Todd served seven years in jail.

== Mountaineering ==
Todd had been an enthusiastic mountaineer since the mid 1970s but much of the mountaineering he carried out before imprisonment was as a client climbing with professional guides. The proceeds from drug dealing supported this enthusiasm; a visit to the International Mountaineering School in Switzerland inspired him to tell the police after his arrest that he had been interested in "buying a climbing school in Switzerland which was on the market for £400,000".

After prison, Todd lived in Kingston upon Thames and his climbing revolved around the North London Mountaineering Club (NLMC). He climbed in the Alps and did some winter climbing in Scotland where his climbing partners included Stephen Venables, and then worked as a winter climbing instructor together with Simon Yates. He later made some first ascents in the Himalaya with Woolridge and Yates later joined some of Todd's Himalayan expeditions as a guide, as did Victor Saunders, another acquaintance from Todd's NLMC days.

His first trip to climb in the Himalaya was in 1984 when he travelled to India with a small party from the NLMC to climb in the Mulkila group. The terms of his probation meant that he could only leave the country if he was accompanied by an "officer of the law" but he was allowed to depart because the barrister, Andrew Bankes, was also a member of NLMC and a member of the party.

His first mountaineering visit to Nepal, in 1987, involved an unsuccessful attempt to climb Ama Dablam in alpine style with Andy Cave and a small party of others. He returned to the mountain in 1992, as expedition leader, and made a successful ascent by the south-west ridge. In 1988, a year after he first attempted Ama Dablam, Todd was a member of a Polish expedition to the south side of Annapurna. Todd only summited Tarke Kang, a subsidiary peak of 7,168 m (23,517 ft) on the easterly ridge from Annapurna, but his role in helping rescue Janusz Majer and another climber led to an invitation to join a Polish team on the north side of Everest in 1989. Todd was unsuccessful on the Everest expedition but this, his first visit to the north side of Everest, led to his organizing commercial expeditions to that side of the mountain.

In 1990, he was back in the Indian Himalaya when he and Mike Woolridge made the first ascent of a new line on Meru Peak. In 1993, he was on Pumori as the leader of an expedition, when eight of fourteen members summited. In 1994, Todd was a member of an expedition led by Ryszard Pawłowski which attempted the west face of Lhotse. Pawłowski was the only person to summit but it was Todd's first experience of Everest's neighbouring peak and over the following 12 years he himself held a permit to lead seven expeditions for Lhotse; Michael Jørgensen, Christine Boskoff and Rob Casserley all summited Lhotse on expeditions organised by Todd.

Todd took part in expeditions to a number of other locations in the years before he embarked on a career as an expedition organiser. Some were far from the Himalaya and included Denali, the Wrangell Mountains, and an unsuccessful attempt to make the first ascent of the SE ridge of Sarmiento in Tierra del Fuego at the end of 1992.

=== Expedition organiser ===
Todd established the company "Himalayan Guides" to organise commercial climbing expeditions which would provide clients with all of the support and advice they needed when climbing on a selected range of Himalayan peaks. At the outset, the people on his expeditions were a mixture of "invited friends" and climbers who paid for their place. Todd and his virtual corporation had no physical offices, only an answering machine and an e-mail address. He dealt with the process of applying for expedition permits, often some years in advance, and after securing the permit he put out word on the mountaineering grapevine and wait for the e-mails to roll in. His trips often filled within days of their announcement.

As expedition manager, Todd provided food, cooks, tents, full oxygen gear, and permits. He also handled the hiring of some Sherpas each season, their services being shared among clients, as were spaces in tents placed at camps higher up the mountain. Many clients would also hire their own dedicated Sherpas and sometimes a professional Guide. He had to deal with the process of importing equipment through the Nepali customs and arrange porters to transport all supplies to Base Camp. His prices were highly competitive and a Todd expedition was a "no-frills adventure for self-sufficient types" The same sirdar, Kami Nuhru Sherpa, was hired by Todd's company for many years and the Sherpa team were considered among the best in the early 2000s.

The first expedition under the "Himalayan Guides" banner was to the north side of Everest in 1995. Eight climbers supported by Todd's company reached the summit that year. Crag Jones, a member of the expedition, climbing independently within the expedition as one of Todd's "invited friends", became the first Welshman to summit Everest. Anatoli Boukreev worked for Todd as a mountain guide on the expedition, providing support for other climbers. Todd had "an immense knowledge of Everest" and often climbed to camp 3 or 4 but the highest he ever reached on the mountain was 8,300 m (27,200 ft) (between the South Col and the South Summit, a little below the Balcony) when, on 26 May 2000, a Serbian client was suffering from altitude sickness and hallucinating so Todd climbed up to him so that he could be brought down to safety.

In 1995, he led the first of many expeditions to Ama Dablam. Simon Yates was employed as a guide and all the expedition members reached the summit.

1996 was his first expedition to Cho Oyu; Todd summited on 27 September 1996 without using supplemental oxygen.

=== 2000-2002 Nepal ban ===
In May 2000, Todd was at the Everest Base Camp with a team that included Finn-Olaf Jones, an American who was filming a climbing program for the Discovery Channel's Travel Channel, posting dispatches from Base Camp as well as attempting to climb Everest. In the early stages of the expedition Jones was involved in a physical altercation with another climber at Base Camp and then, a week or two later, a fight broke out between Todd and Jones. There are conflicting reports about the details of the Todd/Jones interaction but the outcome was that Jones left Base Camp and, on 19 May, two days after the incident, he filed charges against Todd with the Nepalese police. An investigation was carried out and on 6 November the Nepali Culture Ministry announced that Todd "had been found guilty of violating the Tourism Act and was forbidden from entering the country until 2002".

As a result, Todd shifted his operations to Pakistan, but in between trips did an expedition to Cho Oyu in September 2001; the Base Camp normally used for attempts on that mountain's north-west ridge is in Chinese territory and although clients would normally access it from Nepal, via the Friendship Bridge near Kodari, it could also be accessed through China. He also had permits for spring 2002 to climb on the south (Nepalese) side of Everest and on Lhotse (also approached from the Everest Base Camp). Todd claimed that while he personally had been banned from Nepal, the ban did not prevent his company from operating on Everest; whilst his clients and guides climbed in Nepal, Todd was on the north side of the mountain in Tibet, communicating with his team by walkie-talkie from the North Col.

The ban ended on 1 June 2002 and Todd ran a regular cycle until 2006: a spring expedition to Everest, followed by an expedition to Cho Oyu via the north-west ridge in late summer/early autumn, and then an expedition to Ama Dablam via the south-west ridge later in the autumn. Lhotse expeditions ran parallel with several of the Everest permits. By 2008, well in his sixties, he stopped doing that, but did embark on the first of three expeditions to Manaslu. In 2012 two climbers from Todd's group lost their lives on Manaslu in a slab avalanche triggered by a serac fall.

== As icefall-fixer and oxygen supplier ==
When Todd first climbed through the Khumbu Icefall in 1994 the way through the crevasses had been prepared by others but there was contention about how to repay the people who had invested the time and effort into 'fixing' the icefall (and maintaining the 'fix' as the icefall moved during the climbing season). Todd saw the opportunity to setup an arrangement which involved his Sherpas 'fixing' the crossing, for a charge paid by those using the infrastructure, and he was the first to specially import narrow aluminium ladders for bridging the crevasses. In due course the Sagarmāthā Pollution Control Committee trained local Sherpas to do the 'fix', in a way that satisfied the commercial operators, but even by the late 1990s when the Sherpa 'icefall doctors' had completely taken on the task it was Todd who supplied the narrow aluminium ladders which weren't locally available.

Another sideline that Todd developed involved the supply of oxygen cylinders for use on the higher reaches of the mountain, both to his own clients and to other expeditions which were operating on the mountain. In the period from 1995 to 2020, a Russian company, Poisk, is estimated to have supplied over 90 percent of the high-altitude oxygen systems used in Nepal. Whilst other suppliers existed, the innovative design of the Poisk bottles, consisting of a thin titanium lining surrounded by a thick resin and fibre wrapping, meant that they weighed 5.5lbs whereas standard steel cylinders, which climbers might use when sleeping, weighed 13lb each, a crucial difference given that each one has to be carried.

In 1996, Todd arranged an advance purchase agreement with Poisk which gave him the rights as their exclusive distributor for Everest that year. Todd encountered a drawback of that arrangement when he had to leave Base Camp during the expedition to fly back to Kathmandu so he could ensure a smooth passage through customs for extra cylinders.

When Poisk introduced refillable cylinders there was an incentive to return empty bottles (which also helped to address the accumulation of empty cylinders on the mountain, particularly at the South Col). Whilst Poisk positioned themselves as the sole refiller, the fact that they could be refilled led to a range of outfits developing systems for refilling empty oxygen bottles (at a lower price). That led to speculation about the quality and reliability of the oxygen supplied, particularly as the associated regulators would sometimes freeze at high altitudes.

=== Death of Michael Matthews ===
When Michael Matthews reached the summit of Everest from the south side in 1999, he was using an oxygen system provided by Todd. During the descent, Matthews became separated from his guide, Michael Smith, and was never seen again.

Matthews' father initiated a private criminal prosecution for manslaughter against Todd. There were three defendants: Smith (who was Matthews' guide on the summit day), Jon Tinker (the expedition organiser) and Todd (who had supplied Tinker with the oxygen that Matthews was using). Amongst the claims laid by the prosecution was the allegation that the oxygen equipment supplied was "a 'ragtag' mixture of cylinders and regulator valves, with parts that had been filed down to make them fit, not always successfully". It was 2006 before the case was concluded, the judge dismissed the charges against all three defendants and in his comments about the oxygen equipment he stated that although "some of the cylinders were second hand and had been refilled", "the cylinders were not tested at base camp and the climbers had serious problems with them when they reached camps two and four" but "the prosecution case was based upon pure and wholly impermissible speculation" and there was "not one scrap of worthwhile evidence" that Matthews' oxygen had failed.

== Family life and death ==
When Todd was arrested in 1977 he was the father of a young daughter. He then had his second daughter in 1985 once he was out of prison. Todd married in 2004 a woman he had met on an expedition to climb Cho Oyu. In the year she married him, she summited Everest on one of the expeditions he was leading. Henry Todd died in Kathmandu, Nepal, on 3 November 2025 from a stroke after undergoing heart surgery a few days earlier.
