= Rob Casserley =

British surgeon and mountaineer

Robert Hargraves Casserley is a UK emergency and family doctor and mountaineer who has reached the peak of Mount Everest eight times. He appeared in the BBC documentary Everest ER.

Casserley was the first Westerner to twice double-summit Everest in one week. He was a guide on Everest in 2015 during the 2015 Mount Everest avalanches. During his 2015 expedition, an earthquake hit Nepal causing an avalanche at Everest base camp, which his team survived. Prior to that, he had reached the summit eight times.

Casserley was both a climbing partner and long time friend of Henry Todd. He joined Todd on about a dozen of the Himalayan expeditions that Todd led to various eight thousanders from the early part of the 21st century, and was co-leader of several. Todd was a non-climbing member of the base camp team on several expeditions that Casserley led to the Everest area, they summited Cho Oyu together in 2002 and Manaslu in 2009.
