= Three Brothers, South Georgia =

Three Brothers
- Location within South Georgia Island

Highest point
- Coordinates: 54°16′S 36°48′W

Geography
- Location: South Georgia

Climbing
- First ascent: 2001

The Three Brothers (54°16′S 36°48′W) is a group of three (actually four) mountain peaks at the northwest end of the Allardyce Range on South Georgia. They align in a north–south direction, situated 4 miles (6 km) west of the head of Cumberland West Bay in the central part of South Georgia. The origin of the name, which dates back to the 1930s, is not certain.

On 25 January 2001, Crag Jones made the first ascent, solo, of the highest of the Three Brothers peaks. This was part of a combined climbing and filming expedition, which resulted in five 30-minute programmes. Recorded in Welsh, and entitled Haf Ganol Gaeaf (Summer Midst Winter), it was broadcast with English subtitles. The series included: sailing to get there and back, history of the island, South Georgia's wildlife, and first ascent of the 'Three Brothers'.
