= Operation Julie =

1970s UK drug ring investigation

Operation Julie was a UK police investigation into the production of LSD by two drug rings during the mid-1970s. The operation, involving 11 police forces over a 2 1/2-year period, resulted in the break-up of one of the largest LSD manufacturing operations in the world. It culminated in 1977 with enough LSD to make 6.5 million 'tabs' with a then street value of £100 million (equivalent to £588 million today) being seized, 120 people arrested in the UK and France and over £800,000 discovered in Swiss bank accounts.

== Background ==
The two LSD rings broken up by Operation Julie had begun as one organisation. Its founders were David Solomon, an author, and Richard Kemp, a chemist, who first successfully synthesized LSD in 1969.

Unable to effectively distribute the LSD they had made, they turned to Henry Todd to handle sales. At this point the organisation was based in Cambridge. Later Todd enrolled Leaf Fielding as a tabletter, responsible for turning the raw material into accurately measured doses.

In 1973, the producers quarrelled with the distributors and production ceased for a time. Kemp and Solomon set about organising another distribution network and recommenced LSD production in west Wales. Todd recruited a chemist, Andy Munro, to synthesise LSD for his distribution network at a laboratory they set up in Hampton Wick, Greater London. There were now two separate functioning organisations.

In 1975, Todd and Fielding changed roles. Todd took over the tabletting, and Fielding ran the distribution network, supplying Russell Spencely who in turn supplied Alston Hughes (known as 'Smiles'). From Hughes, the LSD was distributed to a number of wholesale dealers in Wales and Birmingham.

In April 1975, Kemp's red Range Rover was involved in a collision with a car near Machynlleth; a passenger in the other car was killed. Kemp was known to Detective Inspector Dick Lee of the Thames Valley Drug Squad as a possible suspect in the drugs trade and when police searched his car they found six pieces of paper which, after being reconstructed, spelt hydrazine hydrate - a key ingredient in the manufacture of LSD. This lead gave police their first clue into the drug ring operating in west Wales.

== Operation Julie ==
The discovery in Kemp's car prompted establishment of Britain's first combined anti-drugs operation. It was led by Dick Lee of the Thames Valley Drug Squad. On 17 February 1976, a meeting in Brecon involving a number of chief constables and senior drug squad officers led to formation of a multi-force operation. This was the beginning of Operation Julie.

In April 1976, 28 drug squad officers from 10 police forces were chosen and sent to Devizes in Wiltshire where they were trained in surveillance techniques. In May 1976, a police team moved into a farmhouse named Bronwydd in Tregaron, overlooking Kemp's cottage. Initially, locals took them for birdwatchers. As the surveillance operation progressed from weeks into months, female officers were added. The first name of one of these surveillance officers, Police Sergeant Julie Taylor, was used as the operation's code name.

Surveillance of Kemp observed his regular 50-mile commutes between his home in Tregaron and Plas Llysyn, an old mansion owned by an American friend Paul Joseph Arnaboldi, in Carno near Llanidloes, mid-Wales. The mansion was watched by police and those arriving were monitored. Lee instructed police to break into the mansion. In the cellar, police took water samples which chemically matched LSD samples the police had.

Kemp's home was now put under 24-hour surveillance and listening devices were installed.

Lee also instructed two undercover officers to infiltrate the small community of Llanddewi Brefi to target Alston Hughes.

== London connection ==
In October 1976, a police team based at RAF Hendon monitored a house in Seymour Road, Hampton Wick. This was the LSD laboratory run by Todd and Munro. Glass utensils used in this laboratory had been secretly marked by police at the factory that produced them in Yorkshire.

== Raids, arrests and trial ==
On 26 March 1977, after 13 months of surveillance, Operation Julie officers swooped on 87 homes in Wales and England, including Fielding's home in Binfield Heath. The gang leaders were caught and a total of 120 suspects were arrested.

At Kemp's home a package containing £11,000 was found as well as LSD crystals and tabletting equipment. At Carno, laboratory equipment was dug out of a well. A further raid in the Dordogne region in France located documents that detailed and proved the LSD business had been immense. Details of French and Swiss accounts were found as well as share certificates.

On 1 December 1977, officers searched Kemp's cottage for a second time and dug up a large plastic box that contained 1.3 kg of LSD crystal - enough to create 6.5 million doses.

In 1978, 15 defendants, including Kemp's partner Christine Bott, appeared at Bristol Crown Court. It took a month for the prosecution to deliver the incriminating evidence. Kemp pleaded guilty and received 13 years in jail, as did Todd. Fielding and Hughes were sentenced to 8 years. Bott was sentenced to 9 years. In total, the 15 defendants received a combined 120 years in jail.

As a result of the seizure it was estimated the price of LSD tabs rose from £1 to £5 each, and that Operation Julie had removed 90% of LSD from the British market. It is thought that LSD produced by the two labs had been exported to over 100 countries. In total, 1.1 million tabs and enough LSD crystal to make a further 6.5 million, were discovered and destroyed.

== Proceeds of crime ==
After the sentencing the court ordered the seizure of more than £750,000 of assets, which included £450,000 held in foreign bank boxes in the name of Todd and two other ringleaders. That order, under the Misuse of Drugs Act 1971, was challenged and the House of Lords held that "Parliament had never intended orders of forfeiture to 'serve as a means of stripping the drug traffickers of the total profits of their unlawful enterprises'".

It was the failure to recover funds in this case which led to the introduction of the Drug Trafficking Offences Act 1986, which was the first legislation to tackle money laundering and empowered the courts to confiscate the proceeds of crime, as opposed to merely forfeiting property associated with the commission of an offence.

== Cultural references ==
A three-part television drama, called Operation Julie, was made by Tyne Tees Television and broadcast on ITV in 1985, following the events of the case from the police point of view. It was directed by Bob Mahoney.

The song "Julie's Been Working for the Drug Squad" by The Clash, from their second album Give 'em Enough Rope, takes its name from Operation Julie.

In December 2010, Welsh actor Matthew Rhys bought the film rights to the book Operation Julie: The World's Greatest LSD Bust by Lyn Ebenezer.

In July 2011, Leaf Fielding's book To Live Outside the Law gave the first insider account of Operation Julie.

Comedian Paul Merton recalled Operation Julie as the inspiration behind his "Policeman on Acid" sketch in his autobiography Only When I Laugh.

The radio drama Julie by Rob Gittins was broadcast on BBC Radio 4 on 26 September 2014.

In September 2016, Stephen Bentley's book Undercover: Operation Julie - The Inside Story gave an account of one of only three undercover officers engaged on the operation.

In August 2022, Theatr na nÓg presented the story as a rock musical to coincide with the National Eisteddfod of Wales at Tregaron, the geographical heart of the story.

Operation Julie is mentioned in the book Undoctored by Adam Kay due to his grandparents' house being used for surveillance during the operation.

In 2021, Catherine Hayes self-published Christine Bott's memoir The Untold story of Christine Bott. As a result of this, Richard Kemp broke 45 years of silence, and Hayes self-published the follow-up book After Julie: The Kemp Tapes.

In 2022, the BBC developed a podcast based on the books, and other contributions, called Acid Dream. The podcast was a finalist in the BBC Audio Drama Awards in 2023.
