= Daniel Jorgensen =

Dan, Daniel or Danny Jorgensen may refer to:

- Daniel Jørgensen (born 1993), Danish track and field athlete and snowboarder
- Dan Jørgensen (born 1975), Danish politician
- Dan Jorgensen (swimmer) (born 1968), retired American swimmer
- Danny Jorgensen, American sociologist
