= Jurgenson (surname) =

Jurgenson or Jürgenson is a Scandinavian surname variant of the Danish surname Jurgensen. The name is common in Estonia.

== List of people with the surname Jurgenson or Jürgenson ==
- Aili Jürgenson (1931–2017), birth name of Estonian patriot Aili Jõgi
- Christine Jurgenson, Canadian curler
- Kalle Jürgenson (born 1960), Estonian astrophysicist and politician
- Luba Jurgenson, French writer of Estonian/Russian origin
- Markus Jürgenson (born 1987), Estonian footballer
- Pyotr Ivanovich Jurgenson (1836–1904), composer and founder of the P. Jurgenson music publishing firm
- Romet Jürgenson (born 1999), Estonian rally driver

== See also ==
- Jorgensen, Joergensen, Jurgensen, Jürgensen, Juergensen, Jorgenson, Jurgenson
