= Đorđić =

Đorđić (Serbian Cyrillic: Ђорђић; also transliterated Djordjic) is a surname found in Bosnia and Serbia. Notable people with the surname include:

- Bojan Đorđić (born 1982), Serbian-born Swedish football player
- Ignjat Đorđić (1675–1737), Ragusan poet and translator
- Petar Đorđić (born 1990), Serbian handball player
- Ranko Đorđić (born 1957), Bosnian Serb football manager and former player
- Svemir Đorđić (born 1948), Serbian football player
- Zoran Đorđić (born 1966), former Serbian handball player

== See also ==
- Đorđević, a surname
- Đorđe, a given name
