= Jorissen =

Jorissen is a Dutch surname meaning "son of Joris", equivalent to English Georgeson. Notable people with the surname include:

- Adriaen Jorissen Thienpoint, Dutch explorer
- E. J. P. Jorissen (1829–1912), Dutch lawyer and politician
