= Yurevich =

Yurevich (Belarusian: Юрэ́віч; Russian: Юре́вич) is a Belarusian surname. Its Lithuanized form is Jurevičius, Polonized: Jurewicz, Romanian: Iurevici.

It may refer to:

- Alyaksandr Yurevich (born 1979), Belarusian footballer
- Anatoliy Yurevich (born 1957), Belarusian football coach
- Julia Yurevich, beauty pageant contestant who represented Bulgaria in Miss World 2008
- Mikhail Yurevich (born 1969), former governor (2010–2014) of Chelyabinsk Oblast, Russia
