= Jurkiewicz =

Jurkiewicz is a Polish surname, which is derived from the given name Jurek, a form of the Greek name Georgios. It may refer to the following notable people:

- Anna Jurkiewicz (born 1984), Polish figure skater
- Edward Jurkiewicz (born 1948), Polish basketball player
- Katarzyna Starr (born 1982, née Jurkiewicz), Polish and English chess master
- Mariusz Jurkiewicz (born 1982), Polish handball player
- Walt Jurkiewicz (1919–2002), American football player, teacher, and coach
- Wojciech Jurkiewicz (born 1977), Polish volleyball player
