= Nahapet Gevorgyan =

Armenian politician (born 1957)

Nahapet Gevorgyan (Armenian: Նահապետ Գեւորգյան; born June 28, 1957) was born in the village of Hoktember in the Hoktemberyan region in Armenia.

== Political career ==
On May 25, 2003 he was elected again to the NA from electoral district 30, and he serves on the NA Standing Committee on Defense, National Security and Internal Affairs. He is also a member of the Republican Party of Armenia Faction.
