= Petrus Olai =

Danish Franciscan friar and historiographer

Petrus Olai (Peder Olsen, ca. 1490–ca. 1570) was a Danish Franciscan friar and historiographer. No details about his life are known. He refers to himself as Petro Olavo Saneropio Minoritano in a colophon of his Collectanea ad historiam danicam pertinentia. A later note in the same manuscript by Anders Sørensen Vedel (fol. 171v) suggests that he was dead by c. 1570.

He was presumably a monk in Roskilde monastery, for which reason Lyschander (ca. 1620) refers to him as Petrus Olai Roschildensis. The byname Saneropius refers to Sonnerup parish (now in Lejre Municipality), some 10 km west of Roskilde.

Petrus likely began his Collectanea in c. 1515, when he was still a young monk, as a personal notebook. From c. 1522, he was employed by his order to write a chronicle about the Franciscans in Scandinavia. After the Reformation (in 1537) the order was dissolved in Denmark, but Petrus continued his work on Danish history until c. 1560, as Danorum Gesta, not to be confused with the earlier work Gesta Danorum.

The manuscript of Collectanea ad historiam danicam pertinentia (AM 107 8°, 172 folia) is a notebook with complicated structure, extended by numerous extra pages and loose slips of paper, and numerous interlinear and marginal notes, and has never been edited in its entirety.

The Danorum Gesta, on the other hand, is a coherent text. It is extant in the manuscripts Uppsala University Library DG 37, 86 folia, and Copenhagen, Royal Library, GKS 2461 4° (92 folia). It treats the history of Denmark from 1191 to 1559, but it contains little original information. The two manuscripts contain the same text from 1319, with only the Uppsala ms. containing the portion of 1191 to 1318. Both are near-contemporary copies but not autographs. The greater part of the text consists of excerpts from the Collectanea; the Gesta is, in fact, the systematic synthesis of the material collected over the years in his notebook. It represents the first effort at a coherent "Continuation of Saxo", as presented with more lasting influence (and in print) by Arild Hvidtfeldt in 1600.

The Colectanea were extensively used by other historians already during Petrus' lifetime, notably by Paulus Helie for his Skiby-chronicle, by Hans Svaning and by Anders Sørensen Vedel who inherited the Colectanea ms. after Petrus' death. Arne Magnusson acquired the ms. in 1726 and partial editions of the texts were published in Scriptores rerum Danicarum by Jakob Langebek beginning in 1772.

The Danorum Gesta was translated in part (for the period 1448–1559) into Danish, as the Roskilde-årbogen, which would be very influential in the decades leading up to the publication of Arild Hvidtfeldt's Danske Krønike in 1600.
