= John Jurewicz =

American painter

John Jurewicz is a Polish-American artist specializing in painting Byzantine icons and frescoes. John is the son of Fr. Theodore Jurewicz, an Orthodox old-rite priest and artist specializing in the same field of visual art.

Jurewicz grew up in Erie, Pennsylvania, the eighth of ten children in his family. He now lives in Chicago with his artist wife, Irene, an immigrant from Russia, and two daughters. John began painting icons alongside his father and traveled the United States working with him to work on projects. Jurewicz continues this tradition as his family journeys to Orthodox congregations to paint them. Jurewicz's independent work is concentrated in the Midwest, including Illinois and Indiana, as well as at a church in Dallas, Texas.
