= Tereza Gevorgyan =

Armenian soprano (born 1988)

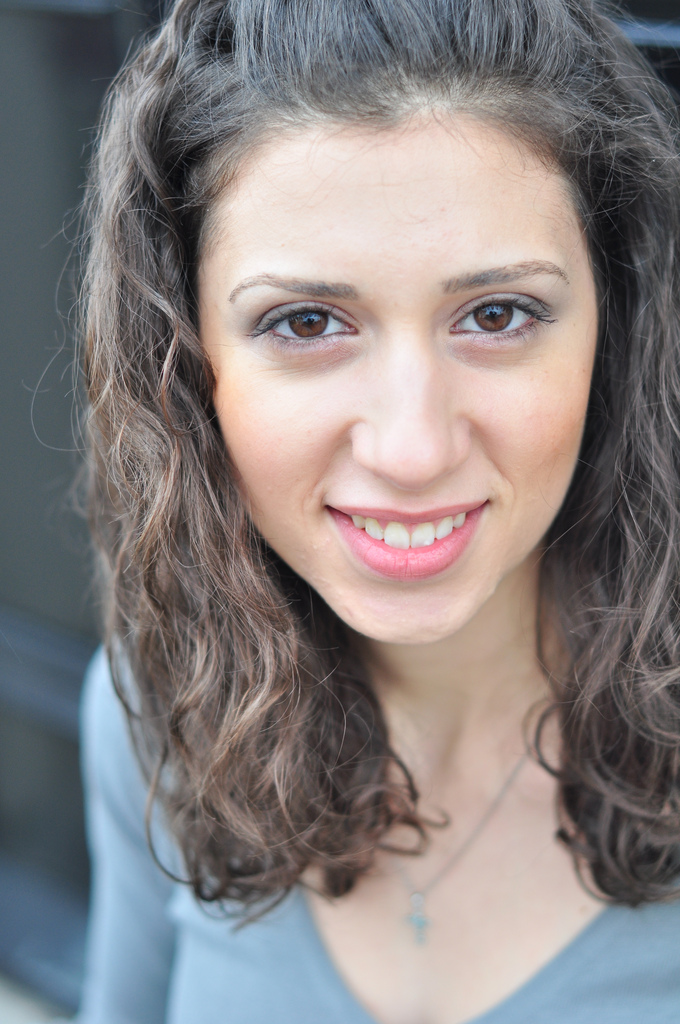
Tereza Gevorgyan, 2012

Tereza Gevorgyan (Armenian: Թերեզա Գևորգյան; born 1988) is an Armenian soprano.

== Biography ==
Tereza Gevorgyan studied in the Yerevan State Conservatoire with Rafael Akopyants. She studied with Lillian Watson and Jonathan Papp at the Royal Academy of Music, where she finished her Master of Arts with Distinction DipRAM; she also studied with Diane Forlano, where she is now part of the opera course. She is grateful for the generous support of the Raffy Manoukian Scholarship. At the age of eight, Gevorgyan entered Alexander Spendiaryan’s junior school of music to study piano. Later she transferred to the senior college, where she began studying classical singing.

Gevorgyan has won several vocal competitions in Armenia. In November 2006 she took part in Tatevik Sazandaryan's solo performers national contest, where she won two prizes: "Special" and "Hope". Two years later in November 2008 she competed in Gohar Gasparyan's solo performers' contest, where she won the Gohar Gasparyan prize. In April 2009 she advanced to the final stage of the Hans Gabor Belvedere auditions in Vienna, Austria. Gevorgyan also won first prize in the Ludmilla Andrew Russian Song Prize at the Royal Academy of Music. At the Royal Academy of Music, Gevorgyan was awarded the Douglas Samuel and Birdie Matthews Award.

- Winner of the Ludmilla Anrew Russian Song Prize
- Winner Of the Thelma Kings Singers' Award
- Winner of the Les Azuriales Karaviotis Prize

=== Performances ===
In opera she already performed Serafina Il campanello, Serpina in La serva padrona, Fanni in La cambiale di matrimonio (National Opera Studio in Armenia), Maria Bertram in Mansfield Park (Royal Academy of Music). She has sung the title role in the Armenian opera Anoush (The Tabernacle). She also sang in many opera scenes as Elvira in I puritani, Countess Adèle Le comte Ory, Agnes in The Growing Castle, Antonia in The Tales of Hoffmann and Miss Wingrave in Owen Wingrave. Gevorgyan was one of 12 young singers selected for the 2011 season Georg Solti Academy in Tuscany, having intensive training with Dame Kiri Te Kanawa and Sir Thomas Allen. During the course she had concerts in Tuscany and Florence. In 2011, Gevorgyan recorded an Italian song for the 100th birthday celebration CD of Georg Solti, which was produced by Richard Bonynge.

Performances in 2012 included concerts in Florence and Naples at the Palace of Caserta. In London she sang the Brahms Requiem and Mendelssohn's "Hear My Prayer" at the Church of St. Mary the Virgin with the Stanmore Choral Society. Gevorgyan also performed in the ISWA World Solid Waste Congress 2012 in Florence. She performed in New York City's Carnegie Hall and Chicago Symphony Hall celebrating Georg Solti's 100th birthday with the World Orchestra for Peace conducted by Valery Gergiev.

In March 2013, Gevorgyan sung the role of Tatiana in Tchaikovsky's Eugene Onegin at the Royal Academy of Music. She has auditioned for the Les Azuriales Young Artist Programme Competition and has been offered a place on the programme in Nice. She played Lisette in Opera Holland Park's 2017 production of Puccini's La rondine, described by Opera Today as singing a delightful, hyperactive Lisette with "style and accuracy".
