= Pavel Gevorgyan =

Russian professor, doctor of science in physics and mathematics

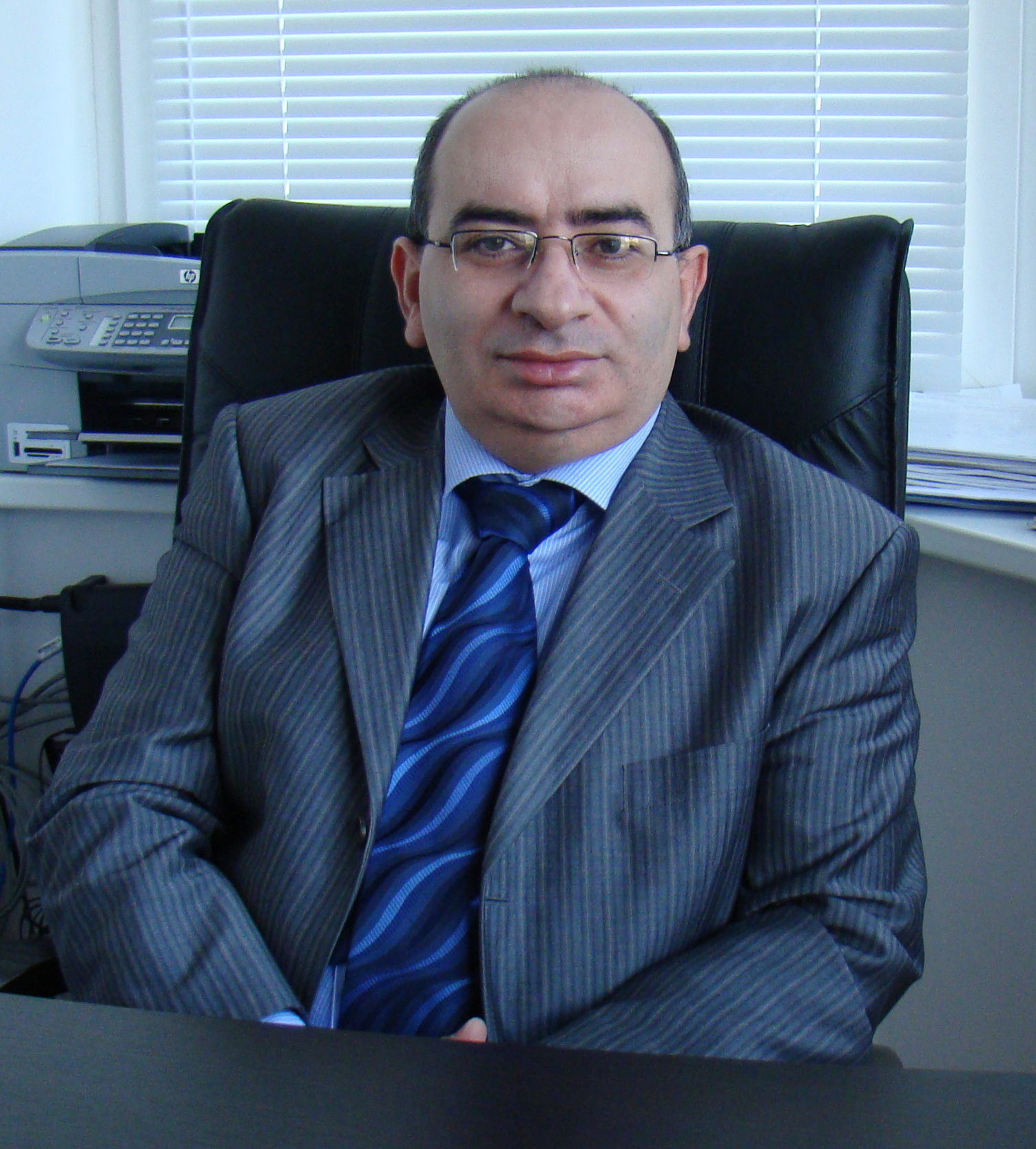
- Born: 8 April 1963 (age 63); Azokh, Nagorno-Karabakh, Soviet Union
- Education: Yerevan State University, Moscow State University
- Scientific career
- Fields: Mathematics
- Doctoral advisor: Yu.M. Smirnov

Pavel Georgyan (born 8 April 1963 in Azokh, Hadrut region, Nagorno-Karabakh, USSR) is a professor, doctor of science in physics and mathematics, corresponding member of Russian Academy of Natural Sciences, Head of Department of Mathematical Analysis] of Moscow State Pedagogical University.

Gevorgyan was awarded with the Russian Federation Government Prize in Education (2014).

He is an Honorary Worker of higher professional education of Russian Federation.

== Family ==
Gevorgyan is married and has two children.

== Education ==
- In 1980 entered Yerevan State University, Faculty of Mathematics and Mechanics
- In 1984 became the winner of Mathematical Olympiad for high school students (Armenia)
- In 1984 he transferred to MSU Moscow State University, Department of higher geometry and topology
- 1985–1989: Postgraduate in Moscow State University, Department of higher geometry and topology
- 1989: Candidate of Science (equivalent of Ph.D.) in Physics and Mathematics.

Dissertation: “Equivariant movability” (under the supervision of professor Yu.M.Smirnov).

- 2001: Doctor of Science in Physics and Mathematics

Dissertation: “Generalized shape theory and movability of continuous transformation groups”.

== Research area ==
Topological transformation groups. Equivariant topology. Shape theory.

== Career and present positions ==
- 1993–1996: Dean of Faculty of Natural Sciences, 1994–1996: Head of Department of Higher Mathematics, 1996–2000: Rector of Artsakh State University (in Nagorno-Karabakh)
- 2000-2015: Professor of Department of Higher Mathematics of Moscow Power Engineering Institute
- 2008-2016: Head of Department of Higher and Applied Mathematics of Academy of Labour and Social Relations
- 2015-2016: Vice-rector of Moscow State Pedagogical University
- Since 2015: Head of Department of Mathematical Analysis of Moscow State Pedagogical University
- Since 2005: Member of Scientific-Methodological Council on mathematics of Ministry of Education and Science of Russian Federation
- 2008: Corresponding member of Russian Academy of Natural Sciences
- 2012: Honorary Worker of Higher Professional Education of Russian Federation

== Publications ==
- Gevorgyan P.S., Pop I., Movable morphisms in strong shape category. Topology and its Applications, Elsevier BV (Netherlands), 2019, p. 107001.
- Геворкян П.С., Хименес Р., Об эквивариантных расслоениях G-CW-комплексов. Математический сборник, 2019, том 210, № 10, с. 91-98.
- Геворкян П.С., Теория шейпов. Фундаментальная и прикладная математика, 2019, том 22, № 6, с. 19-84.
- Gevorgyan P.S., Iliadis S.D., Groups of generalized isotopies and generalized G-spaces. Matematicki Vesnik, Drustvo Matematicara SR Srbije (Serbia), 2018, 70, № 2, pp. 110–119.
- Gevorgyan P.S., Pop I., Shape dimension of maps. Buletinul Academiei de Ştiinţe a Republicii Moldova. Matematica, Vladimir Andrunachievici Institute of Mathematics and Computer Science (Moldova), 2018, 86, № 1, pp. 3–11.
- Геворкян П.С., Группы обратимых бинарных операций топологического пространства. Известия НАН Армении: Математика, 2018, № 1, с. 37-44.
- Gevorgyan P.S., Pop I., On the n-movability of maps. Topology and its Applications, издательство Elsevier BV (Netherlands), 221(2017), pp. 309–325.
- Gevorgyan P.S., Iliadis S.D., Sadovnichy Yu V., Universality on frames. Topology and its Applications, издательство Elsevier BV (Netherlands), 220(2017), pp. 173–188.
- Gevorgyan P.S., Groups of binary operations and binary G-spaces. Topology and its Applications, издательство Elsevier BV (Netherlands), 201(2016), pp. 18–28.
- Gevorgyan P.S. and Pop I., Movability and uniform movability of shape morphisms. Bulletin Polish Acad. Sci. Math. 64 (2016), 69-83.
- Gevorgyan P. S., Groups of binary operations and binary G-spaces. Topology and its Applications. — 2016. — Vol. 201. — P. 18–28.
- Gevorgyan P. S. On binary G-spaces. Mathematical Notes. — 2014. — Vol. 96, no. 4. — P. 600–602.
- Gevorgyan P. S., Yu.M. Smirnovʼs general equivariant shape theory. Topology and its Applications, Volume 160(2013), pp. 1232–1236.
- Gevorgyan P. S., Equivariant movability of topological groups. Topology and its Applications, Volume 159, Issue 7, 15 April 2012, Pages 1761–1766.
- Gevorgyan P. S., On equivariant movability of topological groups. 2010 Int. Conf. On Top. And its Appl., Nafpaktos, Greece, p. 108-109.
- Gevorgyan P. S., Pop I. Uniformly movable categories and uniform movability of topological spaces. Bull. Polish Acad. Sci. Math., (55) 2007, 229—242.
- Gevorgyan P. S., Movable categories. 2006 Int. Conf. On Top. And its Appl., Aegion, Greece, p. 74-75.
- Gevorgyan P. S., Some questions of equivariant movability. Glasnik Mat., 39(59)(2004), p. 185—198.
- Gevorgyan P. S., Movable categories. Glasnik Mat., 38(58)(2003), p. 177—183.
- Gevorgyan P. S., Free equivariant shapes. Sixteenth Summer Conference on Topology and its Applications, July 18–20, 2001, New York, NY, United States.
- Gevorgyan P. S., Algebraic characterization of movable spaces. Algebra, Geometry and Applications, 2001, N 1, p. 12-18.
- Gevorgyan P. S., On the topological distributive algebras. Int. Conf. On Topology and its Applications, Yokohama, Japan, September 1–3, 1999.
- Геворкян П. С., Вопросы эквиваринтной подвижности G-пространств. Вестник МГУ, Сер. 1, Математика. Механика, 2003, № 2, с. 59-63.
- Геворкян П. С., Шейповые морфизмы в транзитивные G-пространства. Мат. Заметки, 2002, т. 72, вып. 6, с. 821—827.
- Геворкян П. С., Теория K-шейпов. Известия НАН Армении, сер. Математика.
- Геворкян П. С., Об одном критерии подвижности. Мат. Заметки, 2002, т. 71, N 2, с. 311—315.
- Геворкян П. С., Эквивариантная теорема Фрейденталя и эквивариантная G-подвижность. УМН, 2001, т. 56, вып. 1(337), с. 159—161.
- Georgian P. S., An equivariant generalization of Arens-Ellis theorem, Izvestya Natsionalnoi Akademii Nauk Armenii. Matematica, vol. 31, No. 5 (1996), pp. 70–75 (in Russian).
- Геворкян П. С., Мажоранты для G-подвижных компактов. УМН, 1989, т. 44, N 1, с. 191—192.
- Геворкян П. С., О G-подвижности G-пространства. УМН, 1988, т. 43, N 3, с. 177—178.
- Georgian P. S., Linearization of completely regular G-spaces, 5 Tiraspol Symposium on General Topology and Its Applications, (1985), pp. 61–62 (in Russian).

=== Textbooks on mathematics ===
- Gevorgyan P. S., Higher Mathematics. Principles of Mathematical Analysis. Moscow, Fizmatlit, 2004, 2013. - 240p. (in Russian).
- Gevorgyan P. S., Higher Mathematics. Integrals, Series, Complex analysis, Differential Equations. Part 2. Moscow, Fizmatlit, 2007. - 272p. (in Russian).
- Gevorgyan P. S., Higher Mathematics. Linear Algebra and Analytic Geometry. Moscow, Fizmatlit, 2007. - 208p. (in Russian).
- Petrushko I. M., Gevorgyan P. S., etc., The course of higher mathematics. Series. Moscow, 2009. -173p. (in Russian).
- Gevorgyan P. S., Lancova O.Yu., etc., Higher Mathematics for Economists. Moscow, Economika, 2010. - 352p. (in Russian).
- Gevorgyan P. S., Bogataya S.I., etc., Problems in Higher Mathematics for Economists. Moscow, Economika, 2010. - 384p. (in Russian).
- Gevorgyan P. S., Potemkin A.V., Eysimont I.M., Probability theory and mathematical statistics. Moscow, Economika, 2012. - 208p. (in Russian).
- Gevorgyan P. S., Zakaryan V.S., Higher Mathematics. Part I. Yerevan, Editprint, 2009. - 384p. (in Armenian).
- Gevorgyan P. S., Zakaryan V.S., Higher Mathematics. Part II. Yerevan, Editprint, 2012. - 464p. (in Armenian).
