= Soulis Georgiades =

Greek film producer

- Σούλης Γεωργιάδης
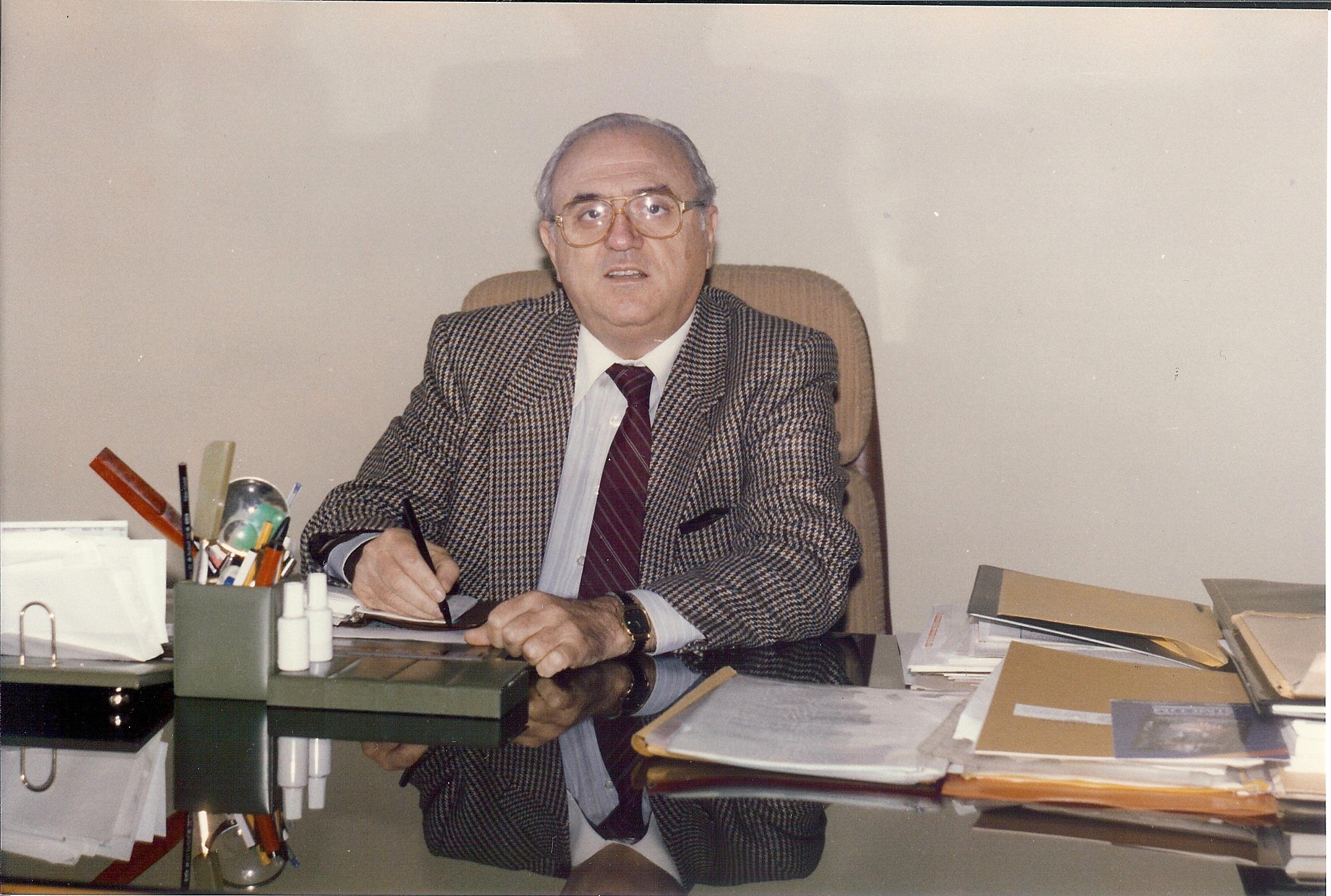
- Born: Athanasios Georgiades; 1934; Thessaloniki, Greece
- Died: 24 January 1997 (aged 62–63); Athens, Greece
- Occupations: Producer, director

Soulis Georgiades (1934–1997) was a Greek film producer and director.

== Early life and family ==
Georgiades was born in Thessaloniki, Greece in 1934 to Dimitri and Maria (Domouza) Georgiades. His father was from Rapsani and his mother was from Thessaloniki. As a child, Georgiades was interested in cinema and organised small shows on his own. After finishing his education in Thessaloniki, he attended the Institute for the Study of Cinematography in Paris, where he studied with Costa-Gavras, Dimitri Kollatos, Vassilis Vassilikos, and Dimitris Makris. He finished his coursework in 1956.

== Career ==
Georgiades worked as a commercial director for a number of advertisements, including for clients Fratelli Fabbri Editori and IMEC. In 1962, he founded the Art Film Production Company in Milan; his later advertisements were produced through here. He was the first to center Milva in an advertisement early in her career. In 1965, Minister George Mpakatselos asked him to move to Athens to help establish Greek public television. The following year, he founded his second company, General Film Production, which closed in 1979. From there, he founded DEK, Ltd., which offered video cassette duplication services. In 1976, he directed a twelve-film documentary series called Our National Heritage (Η εθνική μας κληρονομιά). In the mid-1980s, he acquired the studios of Finos Film, which included two 800 square metres (8,600 sq ft) sound stages.

In 1988, he acquired a hotel and restaurant with the intention to integrate several foreign productions that made use of facilities for audio-visual soundstage. Throughout his career, he directed and produced tourist films for the company Greeks for Tourism. Georgiades was also a friend and collaborator of Walter Chiari.

He was a member of the Hellenic Union of Directors in 1969 and sat on the prize and admissions committees for the Thessaloniki International Film Festival in 1979 and 1980. He sat on the Committee of the Ministry of Hellenic Industry for the development of cinematography in 1980 and 1981. He was also a member of the Greek Association of Audiovisual Producers and remained on its board of directors until 1995.

== Personal life ==
In addition to films, Georgiades enjoyed cooking and Italian cuisine. In 1957, he met Maria Bianconi, daughter of painter Fulvio Bianconi; the couple were married the following year in Milan and had two sons, Dimitri and Piero. They separated in 1971 and he remarried in 1985. He suffered a stroke in 1989 and had a bypass operation. He died of a heart attack in Athens on 24 January 1997.

== Awards and honours ==
- 1962: Prix d'honor, Trieste Film Festival
- 1963: First prize, Bordighera Humour Film Festival
- 1964: First prize, Bordighera Humour Film Festival
- 1964: First prize, MIFED (Mercato internazionale del film e del documentario)
- 1964: First prize, Prime Minister of Italy

== Selected filmography ==
=== Film ===
| Year | Title (English) | Title (Greek) | Director | Producer | Notes | Ref |
|---|---|---|---|---|---|---|
| 1952 | Life Ended at Eight | Στις οκτώ έσβησε η ζωή | X | X | | |
| 1955 | The Visitor | Ο ΕΠΙΣΚΕΠΤΗΣ | X | | | |
| 1962 | The Nightmare | Ο εφιάλτης | X | X | | |
| 1967 | Lovers of the Middle Wall | Οι Εραστές του Μεσαίου Τοίχου | X | X | | |
| 1970 | The Mutiny of Ten | Η ανταρσία των δέκα | | X | Co-produced with Errikos Andreou | |
| 1978 | Intrigue in Delphi | Το κόλπο του τούνελ | X | X | Co-directed with Sergio Bergonzelli | |
| 1979 | The Tunnel Trick | ΤΟ ΚΟΛΠΟ ΤΟΥ ΤΟΥΝΕΛ | X | | Co-directed by Sergio Bergonzelli | |
| 1985 | The Murder Wore Tuxedos | O Δολοφόνος φορούσε σμόκιν | X | X | | |
| 1986 | Strange Meeting | Παράξενη συνάντηση | | X | | |
| 1987 | I Want a Man | ..Άντρα θέλω ... | | X | | |
| 1987 | Like This, That and Otherwise | Έτσι, αλλιώς ... και αλλιώτικα | | X | | |
| 1987 | Reverse Route | Αντίστροφη Πορεία | | X | | |
| 1987 | The Woman of the First Page | Η ΓΥΝΑΙΚΑ ΤΗΣ ΠΡΩΤΗΣ ΣΕΛΙΔΑΣ | | X | | |
| 1988 | My Servant... and I | Ο υπηρέτης μου και εγώ ... | | X | | |
| 1988 | The Air Hostess | Η Αεροσυνοδός | X | X | | |

=== Television ===
| Year(s) | Title (English) | Title (Greek) | Director | Producer | Notes | Ref |
|---|---|---|---|---|---|---|
| 1980 | Wooden Swords | Τα Ξύλινα σπαθιά | | X | | |
| 1986 | A Star is Born... With Caesarean Delivery | Ένα αστέρι γεννιέται ... με καισαρική | | X | | |
| 1986 | Emigrants' Café | Καφενείο Εμιγκρέκ | X | X | 13 episodes | |
| 1987 | The Woman of the First Page | Η γυναίκα της πρώτης σελίδας | | X | | |
| 1988 | Mr. Butterfly Goes to Paradise | Ο πεταλούδας πάει στον παράδεισο | | X | | |
| 1988-1989 | Self-Portraits | Αυτοπροσωπογραφίες | X | X | 40 episodes | |
| 1989 | The Companion and the Cop | Ο σύντροφος κι 'ο μπάτσος | | X | | |
| 1992 | Amazon Files | ΦΑΚΕΛΟΣ ΑΜΑΖΩΝ | | X | | |
| 1993 | The Thirteenth Box | ΤΟ ΔΕΚΑΤΟ ΤΡΙΤΟ ΚΙΒΩΤΙΟ | | X | | |
| 1994 | Someone Protect Her | ΚΑΠΟΙΟΣ ΝΑ ΤΗΝ ΦΥΛΑΕΙ | | X | | |
| 1995 | Anyhow | ΕΤΣΙ ΚΙ 'ΑΛΛΙΩΣ | | X | | |
| 1996 | Come to Psalti | ΕΛΑ ΣΤΟΝ ΨΑΛΤΗ | | X | | |
