= Gabriel Georgiades =

American professor of aerospace engineering

Gabriel G. Georgiades
- Born: January 18, 1957 (age 69)
- Education: Georgia Institute of Technology (BA); Pennsylvania State University (BAE, MS)
- Known for: Aircraft structures
- Scientific career
- Workplaces: California State Polytechnic University, Pomona

Gabriel Georgiades (born January 18, 1957) is a professor of aerospace engineering in the Department of Aerospace Engineering at California State Polytechnic University, Pomona. He is a widely published author known throughout the world as one of the leading authorities on light aircraft spin tendencies and recovery, along with a major contributor to the creation of the finite element method for analyzing aircraft structures.

== Education ==
Professor Gabriel Georgiades obtained a BA from Jacksonville University in 1979 and a BAE from the Georgia Institute of Technology in 1979.

== Career ==
After working in industry for a number of years at aviation companies such as Piper Aircraft, Georgiades pursued a MS from Pennsylvania State University in aerospace engineering, graduating in 1982. Since 1985, Georgiades has been a full-time professor at California State Polytechnic University, Pomona, teaching courses in structures and finite element method. Gabriel Georgiades is an elected national fellow of the American Institute of Aeronautics and Astronautics (AIAA). Gabriel has held elected AIAA offices such as regional chair, chair-elect, vice chancellor of education, and advisory committee representative and was the former "Evolution of Flight" program officer for the San Gabriel Valley region of AIAA.
