= Annie Jorgensen =

American politician (1886–1956)

Member of the Connecticut House of Representatives from Bozrah
- In office 1955 – July 27, 1956
- Preceded by: Lawrence M. Gilman
- Succeeded by: Harold D. Winchester

Personal details
- Born: Annie Latimer; December 4, 1886 Montville, Connecticut, U.S.
- Died: July 27, 1956 (aged 69) New London, Connecticut, U.S.
- Party: Democratic
- Spouse: S. Oliver Jorgensen (m. 1954)
- Children: 1

Annie Jorgensen (December 4, 1886 – July 27, 1956) was an American politician who served in the Connecticut House of Representatives from 1955 to her death in 1956, representing the town of Bozrah as a Democrat.

Jorgensen died on July 27, 1956, at Lawrence + Memorial Hospital in New London, Connecticut. She was 69.
