= Jorgenson =

Jorgenson may refer to the following notable people:

- Bill Jorgenson, American bluegrass musician
- Carl O. Jorgenson, American politician
- Dale W. Jorgenson, economist at Harvard University
- Dave Jorgenson, American journalist
- Joe Jorgenson, Australian rugby player
- John Jorgenson, American musician
- Matteo Jorgenson, American professional cyclist
- Terri Jorgenson, American politician
- Warner Jorgenson, Canadian politician

== See also ==
- Jorgensen, Joergensen, Jurgensen, Jürgensen, Juergensen, Jorgenson, Jurgenson
