= Kenneth Jørgensen =

Danish handball player (born 1976)

Personal information
- Full name: Kenneth Jørgensen
- Nationality: Danish (Denmark)
- Born: 17 July 1976 (age 50) Middelfart, Denmark
- Height: 190 cm (75 in)

Sport
- Sport: Handball
- Position: Right Winger

Senior clubs
- Years: Team
- –: Fredericia HK
- –: KIF Kolding

Kenneth Jørgensen (born 17 July 1976) is a Danish former handballer and current handball coach. During his playing career he played for Danish Handball League sides Fredericia HK and KIF Kolding.

In 2022 he became the coach of KIF Koldings U17 team together with Martin Buk Eriksen.
