= Theodore Jurewicz =

American painter

- Born: 1948 or 1949 (age 76–77); Erie, Pennsylvania, U.S.

Fr. Theodore Jurewicz (Russian: Феодор Юревич; born 1948 or 1949) is a Polish-American Orthodox old-rite priest and artist specializing in painting Byzantine icons and frescoes. Father Jurewicz is also an archpriest of the Russian Orthodox Church Outside Russia, and serves the parish of the Nativity of the Lord in Erie, Pennsylvania.

== Personal life ==
Fr. Theodore was born Frank Jurewicz in 1949 into a Roman Catholic family in Erie, Pennsylvania.

As a child he attended church assiduously and often visited the Old Believer parish of the Nativity of Christ in Erie. From these visits he developed a deep interest in the Eastern Orthodox Church, and, while still a teenager, converted to Orthodoxy and joined the Russian Orthodox Church Outside Russia.

He married and attended the Holy Trinity Seminary as a married seminarian. In January 1974, Theodore Jurewicz was ordained priest.

Theodore Jurewicz is the father of noted Chicago-based iconographer John Jurewicz.

== Art ==
Fr. Jurewicz is held to be one of the most renowned icon painters in North America today, and has painted about a dozen Eastern Orthodox churches across North America. He was a student of the late Archimandrite Cyprian, founder of the Russian school of iconography outside of Russia.

One of his more famous works was his commission to paint the entire church at New Gračanica Monastery in Third Lake, Illinois, a faithful replica of the original Gračanica monastery in Kosovo, which is listed on the UNESCO World Heritage List as an endangered example of medieval monuments. Done over the span of three years, it is painted in a Byzantine style and features richly colored designs and religious scenes covering the walls, vaults, pillars and dome of the church. The frescoes are painted in acrylics on dry plaster.

Another notable commission of Fr. Theodore is the Saint Sava Serbian Orthodox Church in Merrillville, Indiana where he painted the original frescoes lining the walls and a fresco of the Virgin Mary and the Christ child over the center altar.

In Canada, the most notable Father Jurewcz's work can be seen at St Nicholas Serbian Orthodox Church, 1401 Barton St E, Hamilton ON. This work was done in the early 2000's and took approx 5 years to complete. The work has been captured in pictures by Historical Hamilton, as the church is the oldest Serbian Orthodox Church in Eastern Canada. This church is open to visit and to admire the work.

Fr. Theodore has also mastered the art of Coptic Orthodox iconography. His Coptic iconography can be seen at St. George Coptic Orthodox Church in Toledo, Ohio.

== Sources ==
- "иерей Феодор Юревич" (in Russian).
- "The Parma Parish History". St. Sergius of Radonezh. Archived from the original on February 6, 2023.
