= Elmira Gevorgyan =

Armenian physician (1932–2025)

Elmira Musheghi Gevorgyan (Armenian: Էլմիրա Մուշեղի Գևորգյան; 1 February 1932 – 3 August 2025) was an Armenian physician and neurologist.

== Life and career ==
Gevorgyan was born on 1 February 1932 in Armenian SSR, Transcaucasian SFSR, USSR. She graduated from the Medical Institute of Yerevan in 1955.

From 1973 to 2000, she served as chief neurologist of the Ministry of Health. From 1968, she was the president of the Society of Neurologists of the People's Republic of Armenia. From 1976 to 1996, she was the director of the Department of Neurology, Neurosurgery, and Medical Genetics at the Armenian Medical Institute. From 1996 to 1996, she served as vice-president of the Armenian Department of the International Association for Brain Research.

She was a member of the New York Academy of Sciences from 1998, a member of the International Academy of Ecology and Biolife Safety from 1998 to 2000, and a member of the RD Medical Scientific Academy from 2000 to 2001. She was named "Significant Woman of Science 2005" by the American Biographical Institute, and the Cambridge International Biographical Center recognized her as a leading health professional in the same year.

Gevorgyan died on 3 August 2025, at the age of 93.
