= Jurevičius =

- Lithuanian surname
- m.: Jurevičius
- f.: (unmarried): Jurevičiūtė
- f.: (married): Jurevičienė
- Related names: Polish: Jurewicz, Belarusian/Russian: Yurevich

Jurevičius is a Lithuanian language family name. It may refer to the following notable people:

- Joe Jurevicius, American football player
- Nathan Jurevicius, Australian artist
- Jonas Jurevicius, Juzė Jurevičienė Lithuanian Righteous Among the Nations
- Lina Jurevičiūtė, 2007 entry of Lithuania in the Junior Eurovision Song Contest
