= Jurgensen =

Jurgensen or Jürgensen is a surname of Danish origin. The name refers to:

- Dennis Jürgensen (born 1961), Danish author of children's stories
- Jacob Dahl Jurgensen (born 1975), Danish artist and sculptor living in London, England
- Nicola Jürgensen (born 1975), German clarinetist and academic teacher
- Shane Jurgensen (born 1978), Australian professional cricketer
- Sonny Jurgensen (1934–2026), American football player

== See also ==
- Jorgensen, Joergensen, Jurgensen, Jürgensen, Juergensen, Jorgenson, Jurgenson
