= Jacob Dahl Jurgensen =

Jacob Dahl (born 1975 in Copenhagen, Denmark), formerly known as Jacob Dahl Jürgensen, is an artist based in Copenhagen, Denmark. He attended Goldsmiths College. Dahl works in sculpture, digital printmaking, collage and installation, amongst other media. His work is in the collection of the Saatchi Gallery, the British Museum, The Danish Arts Foundation and the Sammlung Goetz amongst others.
