= Katarzyna Starr =

Polish chess player (born 1982)

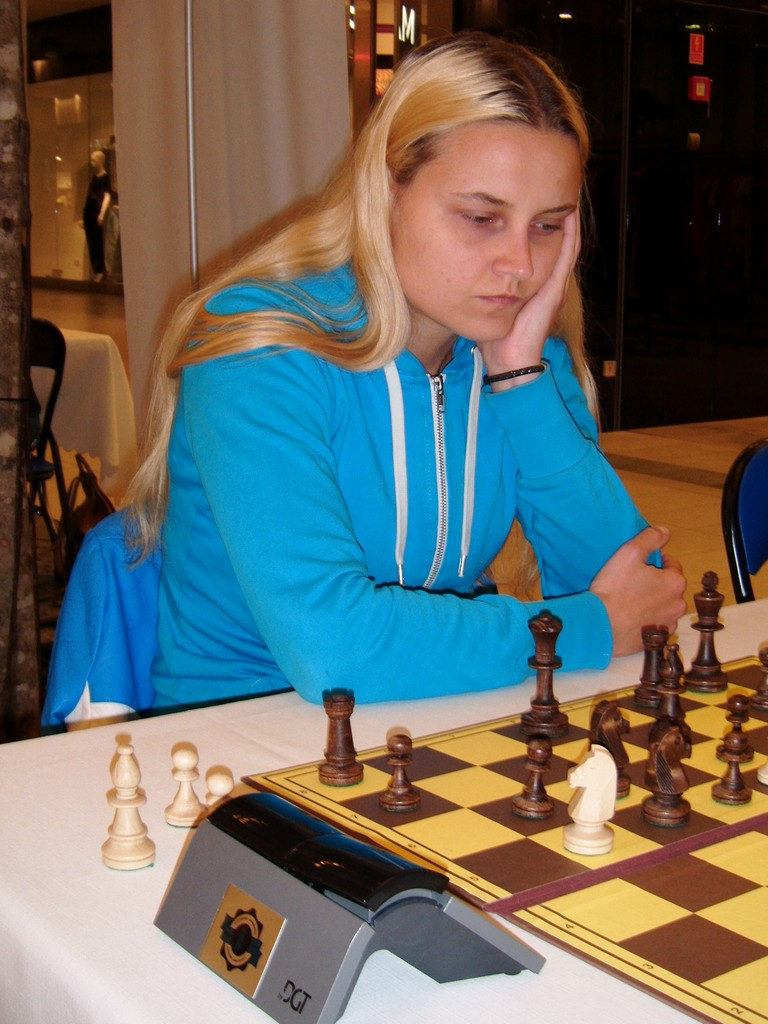
- Katarzyna Starr in 2013

Personal information
- Born: 21 October 1982 (age 43) Katowice, Poland

Chess career
- Country: Poland (until 2021); England (since 2021)
- Title: Woman FIDE Master (2021)
- FIDE rating: 2172 (February 2017)
- Peak rating: 2225 (July 1999)

Katarzyna Starr (née Jurkiewicz; born 21 October 1982) is a Polish Woman FIDE Master (2021) who from 2021 representing England.

== Chess career ==
At the turn of the 20th and 21st centuries, Katarzyna was among the top national juniors, winning medals in Polish Youth Chess Championships in various girls age groups:

- 1998 – Krynica Morska (gold in U16 group), Trzebinia (gold in U20 group),
- 1999 – Nowa Ruda (gold in U18 group), Trzebinia (silver in U20 group),
- 2000 – Trzebinia (gold in U20 group),
- 2001 – Brzeg Dolny (gold in U20 group),
- 2002 – Trzebinia (silver in U20 group).

Katarzyna was also a multiple representative of Poland at the World and European Youth Chess Championships, achieving the best results in 1998 (Oropesa del Mar, World Youth Chess Championship in U16 girls group – 6th place) and in 1999 (Oropesa del Mar, World Youth Chess Championship in U18 girls group – 9th place). In 2001, she won three medals at the World Girls' Junior Team Chess Championship held in Rio de Janeiro.

Her achievements include two medals of the Polish Chess Championships in categories with shortened playing time: in 2000 in Żnin she won a bronze medal in Polish Women's Blitz Chess Championship, and in 2002 in Płock – also bronze, in Polish Women's Rapid Chess Championship. In 2002, she appeared in the finals of individual Polish Women's Chess Championship for the only time in her career, taking 11th place in Ostrów Wielkopolski.

In 2000, in Zakopane Katarzyna with chess club PTSz Płock won silver medal in Polish Team Chess Championship. In 2012, in Wrocław Katarzyna with chess club JKSz MCKiS Jaworzno won Polish Women's Team Chess Championship.

In 2003, she ended her chess career and since that year, she rarely participates in tournaments classified by the FIDE.

Katarzyna reached the highest rating in her career on July 1, 1999, with a score of 2225 points, she was ranked 11th among Polish female chess players.
