= Adolf Ditlev Jørgensen =

Danish historian (1840–1897)

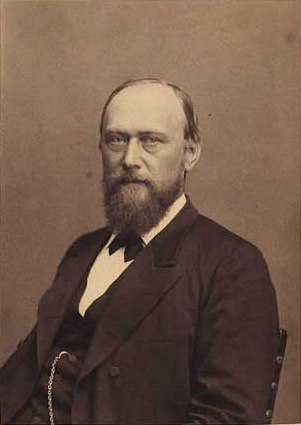
Adolph Ditlev Jørgensen

Adolf Ditlev Jørgensen (11 June 1840 – 5 October 1897) was a Danish historian and National Archivist.

== Biography ==
He was born at Gråsten in the Duchy of Schleswig. He attended Flensborg lærde Skole in Flensburg (1853–1857). He entered Flensborg Latinskole and graduated with distinction in 1859. In 1863, Jørgensen was employed as a high school teacher at Flensburg Alten Gymnasium. In 1864 he went to Copenhagen where from 1869 he was an assistant in the Danish archives and from 1874 deputy clerk. Jorgensen became National Archivist from 1883. He took over the management of the Danish National Archives and carried out a modernization including the establishment of three provincial archives.

He was a member of the Royal Danish Academy of Sciences and Letters from 1883 and from 1894 was commander 2nd degree of the Order of the Dannebrog.

== Selected works ==
- Bidrag til Nordens Historie i Middelalderen (1871)
- Den Nordiske Kirkes Grundlæggelse (1874–1878)
- 40 Fortællinger af Fædrelandets Historie (1882; 1886)
- Udsigt over de danske Rigsarchivers Historie (1884)
- Georg Zoega (1881)
- Niels Stensen (1884)
- Johannes Ewald (1888)
