= Danny Jorgensen =

American sociologist

Danny Lynn Jorgensen (born 1951) is an American professor at the Department of Religious Studies of the University of South Florida, for which he also served as chair from 1999 to 2006.

Jorgensen has been active in the John Whitmer Historical Association since the late 1980s, serving as its president from 1996 to 1997.

== Education ==
- Ph.D., Sociology, Ohio State University, 1979, Linguistics minor. Dissertation: "Tarot Divination in the Valley of the Sun: An Existential Sociology of the Esoteric and Occult."
- M.A., Sociology, Western Kentucky University, Bowling Green, KY, 1974, Thesis: "The Social Construction of Professional Knowledge: Illustrative Empirical Patterns in Social Work, 1956-1973."
- B.S., Sociology, Northern Arizona University, Flagstaff, AZ, 1972, extended major, including field work.

== Bibliography ==
=== Journal articles ===
- The Rise of Mormonism. By Rodney Stark (Reid L. Neilson, ed.). New York: Columbia University Press, 2005. Choice (May 2006).
- Images of the New Jerusalem: Latter Day Saint Factions Interpretations of Independence, Missouri. By Craig S. Campbell. Knoxville: The University of Tennessee Press, 2004. Choice (2005).
- Equal Rites: The Book of Mormon, Masonry, Gender, and American Culture. By Clyde R. Forsberg Jr. New York: Columbia Press, 2004. Choice (December 2005).
- An Introduction to Mormonism. By Douglas J. Davies. New York: Cambridge University Press, 2003. Choice (September 2004).
- All Abraham's Children: Changing Mormon Conceptions of Race and Lineage. By Armand L. Mauss. Urbana: University of Illinois Press, 2003. Choice (April 2004).
- Pagan Theology: Paganism as a World Religion. By Michael York. New York: New York University, 2003. Choice 41 (October 2003): 357.
- By the Hand of Mormon: The American Scripture that Launched a New World Religion. By Terryl L. Givens. New York: Oxford University Press, 2002. Choice 40 (February 2003): 999.
- "Introduction to Emma Curtis Hopkins: Forgotten Founder of New Thought," Journal of the Society for the Study of Metaphysical Religion 8 (2, Fall, 2002): 79–88
- One Nation Under Gods: A History of the Mormon Church. By Richard Abanes. New York: Four Walls Eight Windows, 2002. Choice 40 (November 2002): 484.
- [Review of] Mormon History. By Ronald W. Walker, David J. Whittaker, and James B. Allen. Urbana: University of Illinois Press, 2001. Choice 39 (7, March 2002): 261.
- "The Mormon Gender-Inclusive Image of God," Journal of Mormon History 27 (1, Spring, 2001): 95–126.
- The New Believers: Sects,"Cults" and Alternative Religions. By David V. Barrett. London: Cassell, 2001. Choice 39 (4, December 2001): 283.
- Mormons and Mormonism: An Introduction to an American World Religion. By Eric A. Eliason (ed.). Urbana: University of Illinois Press, 2001). Choice 39 (2, October 2001): 294.
- The Mormon Culture of Salvation: Force, Grace and Gory. By Douglas J. Davies, Burlington, VT: Ashgate, 2000. Choice 38 (10, June, 2001): 300.
- Daughters of the Goddess: Studies of Healing, Identity, and Empowerment. By Wendy Griffin (ed.). Walnut Creek, CA: Altamira, 2000. Sociology of Religion.
