= Göransson =

Göransson is a Swedish surname. It means "son of Göran" and was thus originally a patronymic. Notable people with the surname include:

- André Göransson (born 1994), Swedish tennis player
- Ann-Marie Göransson (born 1947), Swedish major general and surgeon
- Bengt Göransson (1932–2021), Swedish politician
- Bertil Göransson (1919–2004), Swedish rower who competed in the 1956 Summer Olympics
- Curt Göransson (1909–1996), Swedish Army general
- Göran Göransson (born 1956), Swedish former footballer and manager
- Göran Fredrik Göransson (1819–1900), Swedish merchant, ironmaster and industrialist
- Johan Göransson Gyllenstierna (1635–1680), Swedish statesman
- Lecy Goranson, American actress
- Ludwig Göransson (born 1984), Swedish film composer
- Richard Göransson (born 1978), Swedish auto racing driver
- Rickard Göransson, Swedish musician
- Sverker Göranson (born 1954), Swedish army general
- Tim Göransson (born 1988), Swedish tennis player
- Tord Göransson (1910–1997), Swedish diplomat
