= Jorgensen (disambiguation) =

Jorgensen may refer to:

- Jorgensen, a common Danish-Norwegian surname
- Jorgensen Center
- Jorgensen's General Store, American historical site in Grant-Valkaria, Florida
- R. v. Jorgensen, a Canadian legal decision by the Supreme Court of Canada

== See also ==
- Jorgenson
