= Georgios Georgiadis =

Georgios Georgiadis may refer to:

- Georgios Georgiadis (athlete) (born 1948), Greek hammer thrower in the 1972 Summer Olympics
- Georgios Georgiadis (footballer, born 1971), Greek footballer
- Georgios Georgiadis (footballer, born 1972), Greek footballer, now a football coach
- Georgios Georgiadis (footballer, born 1987), Greek footballer
- Georgios Georgiadis (Prince of Samos) (born 1866), Ottoman-appointed Prince of Samos who reigned from 1907 to 1908
