= Gevorkyan =

Gevorkyan or Gevorkian, also spelled Gevorgyan (Armenian: Գևորգյան) or Kevorkian (Armenian: Կևորկյան) as a surname may refer to:

== Gevorkyan / Gevorkian spelling ==
- Armen Gevorkyan, Armenian amateur boxer
- Artur Gevorkyan (born 1984), Turkmen football player
- Ivan Gevorkyan (1907–1989), Soviet Armenian surgeon and scientist
- Karen Gevorkian (born 1941), Armenian Soviet-Russian film director and screenwriter
- Lusine Gevorkyan (born 1983), lead singer of the Russian band Louna
- Tatyana Gevorkyan (born 1974), Russian television presenter, journalist and actress
- Vladimir Gevorkyan (born 1955), Belarusian football coach

== Kevorkian spelling ==
- Armen V. Kevorkian, American-Armenian visual effects supervisor and television director
- François Kevorkian (born 1954), French-born, U.S.-based DJ, producer, remixer and label owner
- Hagop Kevorkian (1872–1962), Armenian-American archeologist, connoisseur of art, and collector
- Jack Kevorkian (1928–2011), American pathologist and euthanasia proponent
- Jerry Kevorkian (1933–2021), American applied mathematician and founding member of the University of Washington's Department of Applied Mathematics
- Nadera Shalhoub-Kevorkian, feminist scholar
- Noura Kevorkian, Syrian Canadian documentary filmmaker
- Ralph G. Kevorkian, co-pilot in TWA Flight 800 accident in 1996
- Raymond Kévorkian (born 1953), French Armenian historian
- Vahram Kevorkian (1887–1911), football player of Armenian descent

== See also ==
- Kevorkian Death Cycle, American electro-industrial band from Riverside, California
- Gevorgian Seminary
- Gevorkyan v. Moshkov, a landmark case that established the precedent for the application of Russian copyright law to online services.
