= Michael Knakkergaard Jørgensen =

Danish alpinist

Michael Jorgenson
- Michael Knakkergaard Jørgensen
- Born: 5 December 1967; Copenhagen, Denmark
- Died: 30 April 1999 (aged 31); Makalu
- Cause of death: Fall
- Resting place: Makalu
- Known for: First Dane to summit Mount Everest, Lhotse and Makalu

Michael Knakkergaard Jørgensen (5 December 1967 in Copenhagen; died 30 April 1999 in Nepal) was a Danish mountaineer. In May 1995, he became the first Danish person to climb Mount Everest, via the north side in Tibet. He would then go on to be the first Dane to summit Lhotse (8501 m) and Makalu (8,462 m).

From 1990 to 1996, Jørgensen was in the military and deployed as a UN soldier.

In 1999, Jørgensen would make his second trip to Makalu, after the mountain claimed his climbing partner Per Lyhne. He arrived prepared for the summit push, leading an expedition of experienced climbers, André Gorge Marchal, who had summited eight eight-thousanders, and Ilgvars Pauls, who had climbed five previously. Despite their experience, weather made climbing conditions difficult on the mountain. On 30 April 1999, Jørgensen became the first Dane to summit Mount Makalu (8,462 m), the world's fifth highest mountain.

On the descent, a rope broke, causing Jørgensen to fall over 500 metres (1,600 ft) to his death. Jørgensen's body later came to rest nearby Makalu's camp 3, where it became a feature for other climbers in their pursuit to the summit.

== Notable climbs ==
Sources:

- May 1995: Climbs Mount Everest using artificial oxygen, first Dane to summit the top.
- May 1996: Attempts both to climb Mount Everest without the use of oxygen cylinders and Lhotse, the world's fourth highest mountain, but both attempts have to be abandoned. Experienced the worst night in Mount Everest's history, when eight people die in a storm.
- January 1997: Summitted Mount Vinson in Antarctica.
- February 1997: Climbs Aconcagua in South America.
- May 1997: Guide on Henry Todd's expedition and climbs Lhotse.
- September 1997: Participates in a Danish-Nepalese expedition to Makalu, where climbing partner Per Lyhne dies. He fails to reach the top.
- September and October 1998: Climb Mt. Kilimanjaro and Mt. Kenya in Africa.
- April 1999: Makes another attempt to climb Makalu - dies on 30 April during the descent after a successful summit.
