= George (surname) =

George is a surname of Irish, English, Welsh, South Indian Christian, Middle Eastern Christian, French, or Native American origin. The German form is Georg. Notable people with the surname include:

- Alex or Alexander George (disambiguation), several people
- Alexandru George (1930–2012), Romanian writer
- Allan George (born 1999), American football player
- Anju Bobby George (born 1977), Indian athlete
- Arthur George (1915–2013), Australian lawyer and soccer administrator
- Augustus George (1817–1902), English cricketer
- Barry George (born 1960), British man who was wrongly convicted of murder
- Bill or Billy George, see William George (disambiguation)
- Bobby George (born 1945), English darts player and presenter
- Brandon George (born 2000), American football player
- Brian George (born 1952), Israeli-born British actor
- Bud George (1927–2017), American politician
- Camilla George (born 1988), Nigerian-born British jazz musician
- Cathy George, American volleyball coach
- Charlie George (born 1950), English footballer
- Charlie George (comedian), (fl. 2020s) British comedian
- Christopher George (1931–1983), Greek-American television and film actor
- Chief Dan George (1899–1981), chief of the Tsleil-Waututh Nation, author, poet and actor
- Daniel George (rugby union) (born 1986), Welsh rugby player
- Daniel G. George (1840–1916), Union Navy sailor and Medal of Honor recipient
- Darryl George (born 1993), Australian baseball player
- David George (disambiguation), several people
- Dennis George (born 1983), West Indies cricketer
- Devean George (born 1977), American basketball player
- Eddie George (born 1973), American football player
- Eden George (1863–1927), Mayor of Christchurch and member of the New South Wales Legislative Assembly
- Edward George, Baron George (1938–2009), British banker
- Eirwyn George (1936–2026), Welsh poet
- Elizabeth George (born 1949), American novelist
- Ella George, Australian politician
- Ella M. George (1850–1938), American teacher, lecturer, social reformer
- Elmer George (1928–1976), American race car driver
- Elva A. George (c.1876–1953), American dietitian
- Emma George (born 1974), Australian athlete
- Esmond George (1888–1959), South Australian theatre director, watercolor artist and art critic
- Even George (1875–1969), Australian politician
- Finidi George (born 1971), Nigerian soccer player
- Florence A. George (1864–1918), English schoolteacher and cookbook writer
- Francis George (1937–2015), American Archbishop and Cardinal
- Frank Honywill George (1921–1997), British psychologist and cyberneticist
- Fricson George (born 1974), Ecuadorian association football player
- Gabrielle George (born 1997), English association footballer
- Genevieve George (1927–2002), Canadian baseball player
- Gladys George (1904–1954), American actress
- Götz George (1938–2016), German actor
- Grover C. George (1893–1976), American farmer and politician
- Gwyneth George (1920–2016), British concert cellist
- Harold Huston George (1892–1942), United States Army brigadier general
- Harry L. George (1849–1923), American collector of Native American artifacts
- Heather George (1907–1983), Australian commercial photographer
- Heinrich George (1893–1946), German stage and film actor
- Helen Margaret George (1883–1982), British artist and sculptor
- Henry George (disambiguation), several people
- Inara George (born 1974), American singer-songwriter
- Isaiah George (born 2004), Canadian ice hockey player
- Jack George (basketball) (1928–1989), American basketball player
- Jacolby George (born 2003), American football player
- James Z. George (1826–1897), US Senator from Mississippi
- Jamie George (born 1990) English rugby union player
- Katie George (cosplayer) (born 1988), American cosplayer
- Katie George (cricketer) (born 1999), English cricketer
- Katie George (sportscaster) (born 1993), American sportscaster
- Linda George (Australian singer) (born 1951), English-born Australian pop singer
- Linda George (Assyrian singer) (born 1964), Assyrian-American pop singer popular in the 1980s–2010s
- Linda K. George (born 1947), American sociologist and gerontologist
- Lizzie George (1863–1937), American clubwoman and philanthropist
- Lynda Day George, American television actress popular in the 1960s and 1970s
- Leroy George (born 1987), Dutch footballer
- Louis George (disambiguation), several people
- Lynda Day George (born 1944), American TV and film actress
- Lowell George (1945–1979), American singer-songwriter and producer
- Lloyd D. George (1930–2020), United States District Judge
- Lloyd R. George (1925–2012), American politician
- Madeline Rees George (1851–1931), South Australian educator
- Manfred George (1893–1965), born Manfred Georg Cohn, German emigrant journalist, author and translator
- Marie George (1877–1974), American actress and singer
- Mary Dorothy George (1878–1971), British historian and compiler of the BM Satires
- Maryanne J. George, American Christian musician
- Margaret George (born 1943), American historical novelist
- Max A. George (born 1988), British singer-songwriter
- Mechthild Georg, German mezzo-soprano
- Melissa George (born 1976), Australian actress
- Melvin Clark George (1849–1933), American politician
- Meriam George (born 1987), Egyptian model
- Michael J. George (1948–2010), American politician
- Mike George (wrestler), American retired professional wrestler
- Myron Virgil George (1900–1972), American politician
- Nate George (born 2006), American baseball player
- Nelson George (born 1957), African-American author, culture critic and filmmaker
- Newell A. George (1904–1992), American politician
- Nina George (born 1973), German author and journalist
- Noel George (1897–1929), English football goalkeeper of the 1920s
- Norman George (born 1946), Cook Islands politician
- Oorlagh George (born 1980), American filmmaker from Northern Ireland
- Paul George (born 1990), American basketball player
- Paul George (disambiguation), several people
- Pete George (1929–2021), American weightlifter and Olympic champion
- Peter George (disambiguation), several people
- Phyllis George (1949–2020), Miss America, sportscaster
- Robert George (disambiguation), several people
- Sophia George (born 1964), Jamaican singer
- Stefan George (1868–1933), German poet
- Susan George (disambiguation), several people
- Terry George (born 1952), Irish screenwriter and director
- Thomas George (disambiguation), several people
- Tom George (born 1956), American politician
- Tony George (born 1959), CEO of the Indianapolis Motor Speedway Co.
- Tyler George (born 1982), American curler
- Uwe George (born 1940), German documentary film maker and writer
- Vanessa George (born 1970), English paedophile convicted in the 2009 Plymouth child abuse case
- W. L. George (1882–1926), English writer
- Wally George (1931–2003), American conservative radio and television commentator
- Walter George (disambiguation), several people
- William George (disambiguation), several people

== See also ==
- Lloyd George (disambiguation), including people with the surname Lloyd George
- George (given name)
- George (disambiguation)
- Gorgeous George (disambiguation)
- Georgiev
- Georgievski
