= 2021 Canadian honours =

Canadian government recognitions

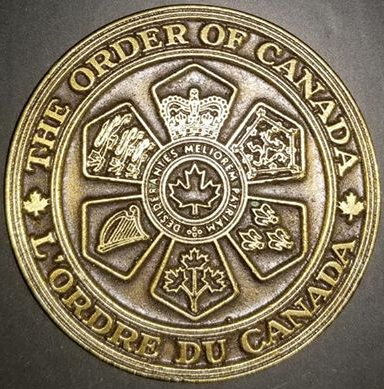
The Seal of the Order of Canada

The Canadian Honours of 2021 were announced on 30 December 2020.

== The Order of Canada ==
=== Companions of the Order of Canada ===
Undress ribbon of a Companion of the Order of Canada

- Robert Daniel Steadward, CC, AOE

=== Officers of the Order of Canada ===
Undress ribbon of an Officer of the Order of Canada

- John Borrows, OC, FRSC
- Helen M. Burt, OC
- John Challis, OC
- Elizabeth A. Edwards, OC
- Peter E. Gilgan, OC, OOnt
- J. Edward Johnson, OC
- Daniel Heath Justice, OC
- Vivian C. McAlister, OC
- Tony Penikett, OC
- The Hon. Lynn Smith, OC, QC
- Daniel Taylor, OC
- Yanick Villedieu, OC, CQ
- Lori Jeanne West, OC

=== Members of the Order of Canada ===
Undress ribbon for a Member of the Order of Canada

- Mary S. Aitken, CM
- Yaprak Baltacioğlu, CM
- Art Bergmann, CM
- Guy Berthiaume, CM
- Myer Bick, CM
- Carolle Brabant, CM
- Michael S.W. Bradstreet, CM
- John W. Brink, CM
- Barbara Elizabeth Butler, CM
- James Casey, CM, MSM
- Brian Cherney, CM
- Gina Cody, CM
- David Cooper, CM
- Michel Cusson, CM
- Rita Davies, CM
- Serge Demers, CM
- Stan Dragland, CM
- L. David Dubé, CM
- Jacalyn Duffin, CM, FRSC
- John G. Geiger, CM
- Susan R. George Bahl, CM
- Vivek Goel, CM
- Gary Gullickson, CM
- John Hartman, CM
- Fr. James Lassiter Holland, CM, AOE, OMI
- Sally Horsfall Eaton, CM, CD
- Ray Ivany, CM, ONS
- Michael A.S. Jewett, CM
- Elder Carolyn King, CM
- R=obert Krell, CM
- Susan Keiko Langdon, CM
- Larry J. Macdonald, CM
- The Hon. Louise Mailhot, CM, OQ
- Marilyn McHarg, CM, OOnt
- Cheryl Lisa Meeches, CM, OM
- Andrew Molson, CM
- Geoff Molson, CM, CQ
- Morris Moscovitch, CM
- Ginette Noiseux, CM
- Leonard Pennachetti, CM
- Lloyd R. Posno, CM
- Heather Ross, CM
- Terry Salman, CM
- Brian Segal, CM
- Douglas R. Stollery, CM, QC
- Frances Westley, CM
- Frances Elizabeth Wright, CM, AOE

== Order of Military Merit ==
Undress ribbon for a Commander of the Order of Military Merit

=== Termination of appointment ===
- Captain (Retired) Jean-Charles Perreault

(Notice is hereby given that the appointment of Captain (Retired) Jean-Charles Perreault to the Order of Military Merit was terminated by Ordinance signed by the Administrator of the Government of Canada on February 3, 2021.

[Dated] Ottawa, April 10, 2021

[Signed] Ian McCowan Secretary General of the Order of Military Merit)

== Order of Merit of the Police Forces ==
=== Officers of the Order of Merit of the Police Forces ===
Undress ribbon of an Officer of the Order of Merit of the Police Forces

- Deputy Chief Brian Bigras, O.O.M.
- Detective Bruce Chapman, O.O.M.
- Deputy Chief Howard Chow, O.O.M. (This is a promotion within the Order)
- Chief Nishan J. Duraiappah, O.O.M. (This is a promotion within the Order)
- Chief Superintendent Keith Douglas Scott Finn, O.O.M.
- Deputy Chief Rajwinder Singh Gill, O.O.M.
- Superintendent Eric Gordon, O.O.M.
- Associate Director-General André Goulet, O.O.M.
- Inspector Daffydd F. Hermann, O.O.M.
- Superintendent Deanna Hill, O.O.M.
- Chief Panagiotis (Peter) Lambrinakos, O.O.M. (This is a promotion within the Order)
- Chief Constable Mark W. Neufeld, O.O.M. (This is a promotion within the Order)
- Sergeant Sean Plater, O.O.M., M.B.
- Ms. Kelly Colleen Rainbow, O.O.M.
- Chief Allan G. Sauve, O.O.M. (This is a promotion within the Order)

=== Members of the Order of Merit of the Police Forces ===
Undress ribbon of a Member of the Order of Merit of the Police Forces

- Deputy Chief Marc Andrews, M.O.M.
- Superintendent Robert Scott Baptist, M.O.M.
- Superintendent John Michael Baranyi, M.O.M.
- Associate Director Caroline Bernard, M.O.M.
- Chief Keith Hunter Blake, M.O.M.
- Chief Lorne Blumhagen, M.O.M.
- Ms. Paula Brown, M.O.M.
- Chief Julia Cecchetto, M.O.M.
- Inspector David Anthony Dalal, M.O.M., C.D.
- Staff Sergeant Gurinder Dhanoa, M.O.M.
- Deputy Chief Ryan K. Diodati, M.O.M.
- Inspector Lori S. Doonan, M.O.M.
- Superintendent Ralph Paul Ehlebracht, M.O.M.
- Chief Superintendent Mark Flynn, M.O.M.
- Staff Sergeant Valarie Gates, M.O.M.
- Deputy Chief Daryl Goetz, M.O.M.
- Superintendent Pauline Anne Gray, M.O.M.
- Staff Sergeant Stephen Alexander Halliday, M.O.M. (Retired)
- Ms. Rhonda Harte-Pittman, M.O.M.
- Deputy Chief Shirley Hilton, M.O.M.
- Sergeant Gordon T. Hughes, M.O.M.
- Deputy Chief Randal A. Huisman, M.O.M.
- Superintendent Jennifer Ann Hyland, M.O.M.
- Sergeant Ralph Kaisers, M.O.M.
- Inspector Francis Patrick Conor King, M.O.M.
- Captain Jean J. L. Lafrenière, M.O.M.
- Patrol Sergeant Grant Lindgren, M.O.M.
- Detective Superintendent Mark A. Loader, M.O.M.
- Chief Daryl R. Longworth, M.O.M.
- Inspector Bethany Dawn McAndie, M.O.M.
- Deputy Chief Kathryn A. McLellan, M.O.M.
- Superintendent Karen A. Meyer, M.O.M.
- Chief Superintendent Brad J. Mueller, M.O.M.
- Staff Sergeant Robert W. Patterson, M.O.M., C.D.
- Deputy Chief Gordon Perrier, M.O.M.
- Chief J. David Poirier, M.O.M.
- Inspector Michael J. Procyk, M.O.M.
- Inspector Michael Purdy, M.O.M.
- Inspector Susan Riddell, M.O.M.
- Chief Hugh Stevenson, M.O.M.
- Mr. Steven James Strang, M.O.M.
- Chief Superintendent Sean Anthony Sullivan, M.O.M.
- Superintendent Peter Kamal Tewfik, M.O.M.
- Corporal Christopher D. Voller, M.O.M.
- Staff Sergeant Darcy J. Woolfitt, M.O.M.
- Superintendent Kelly Young, M.O.M.

=== Termination of appointments ===
- Inspector (Retired) Glenn Louis Howard Trivett (Ontario Provincial Police)
- Police Chief (Retired) Frank Elsner (Victoria Police Department)

== Most Venerable Order of the Hospital of St. John of Jerusalem ==
Undress ribbon for all grades of the Most Venerable Order of the Hospital of St. John of Jerusalem

=== Knights and Dames of the Order of St. John ===
- Her Honour the Honourable Salma Lakhani
- Leslie Helen Jack, Branch Manager at St. John Ambulance (Burlington, Ontario)

=== Commanders of the Order of St. John ===
- Michael David Dan, C.M., O.Ont.
- Lieutenant-Colonel Jason Brent English, M.M.M., C.D.
- Lieutenant-Colonel Carl Gauthier, M.M.M., C.D., AdeC
- Major Éric Girard, C.D.
- Commander Scott Edward Nelson, M.V.O., C.D., AdeC

=== Officers of the Order of St. John ===
- Frank S. Beals
- Michel Doré
- Ronald Larry Green, C.D.
- Heather M. G. Leong
- Claire Elizabeth Mackley
- Lieutenant Joseph Henry Serge Malaison, C.D.
- Lieutenant-Colonel William Andrew Sergeant, O.M.M., C.D., A.D.C. (Retired)
- Martin Wong

=== Members of the Order of St. John ===
- Kim Almond-Pike
- Nicholas James Nathan Barrett
- Barry Ernest Boughen
- Captain Jason Charles Burgoin, C.D.
- Kevin Ka Jun Chan
- Leon Harold Ren-Bo Chew
- Captain Jacques François Marc-André Delisle, C.D.
- Isabelle Derasp
- Jason Andrew Dippel
- Susan Eldersby
- Jean-Pierre Flores
- Martin Garreau
- Matthew James Gauthier
- Sarah Giesbrecht
- Jacques Gosselin
- Brendan Hilton Grue
- Joanne Haggstrom
- Emilie Hamel
- Murray Clair Hamer
- Jennifer Susan Hauser
- Warrant Officer Andrew Christian Derek Hilland, C.D.
- John Richard Hoadley
- Adam C. L. Kinnear
- Robert Dale Leepart
- Nancy Legris
- Anthony Ho Ching Leung
- Ralph Leung
- Judith E. MacArthur
- Diana Eve MacKenzie
- Sean David McCue
- Carol Miller
- James Douglas Mitchell
- Melanie Victoria Moore
- Sean Christopher Morris
- Sylvia Susan Nobbs
- William Michael Grant Osborne
- Michael Otto
- Laura Adele Parrott
- Jonathan Pepin
- Jean Maurice Pigeon
- Gail Anne Pirie
- Joyce Geraldine Anne Polley
- Chanse Wayne Proulx
- Lieutenant-Colonel Felipe Quiroz-Borrero, C.D.
- Barbara Ann Renkers
- Lee Gregory Roche
- Emilie Nicole Romita
- Sander Francis Sarioglu
- Douglas William Sirant
- John Charles Tousignan
- Chance Kenneth Veinotte

== Provincial & Territorial Honours ==
=== National Order of Québec ===
==== Grand Officers of the National Order of Québec ====
Undress ribbon for a Grand Officer of the National Order of Québec

- M. Guy Rocher (promotion)

==== Officers of the National Order of Québec ====
Undress ribbon for an Officer of the National Order of Québec

- M. Renaldo Battista
- M. Ivan Bernier
- M. Guy Breton
- Mme Sophie Brochu
- M. Brian Bronfman
- Mme Louise Caouette-Laberge
- M. Fernand Dansereau
- M. Jean-Pierre Ménard
- M. Serge Ménard
- Mme Suzanne Sauvage
- M. David Saint-Jacques
- M. Jean-Marc Vallée
- M. Jean-P. Vézina

==== Knight of the National Order of Québec ====
Undress ribbon for a Knight of the National Order of Québec

- M. Steve Barakatt
- M. Louis Bernatchez
- M. Charles Binamé
- M. Marcel Boyer
- Mme Madeleine Careau
- M. Guillaume Côté
- M. Mario Cyr
- M. Gaston Déry
- Mme Claire Deschênes
- Mme Johanne Elsener
- Mme Anne-Marie Hubert
- Mme Florence Junca-Adenot
- Mme Louise Latraverse
- M. Andrew Molson
- Mme Michèle Ouimet
- Mme Morag Park
- M. Claude Provencher
- Mme Jennifer Stoddart
- Mme Sophie Thibault
- Mme Sylvie Vachon

=== Saskatchewan Order of Merit ===
- Mavis Ashbourne-Palmer
- Michael Bishop
- Albert Brown
- Marie-Anne Day Walker-Pelletier, CM
- Hart Godden
- Solomon Ratt

=== Order of Ontario ===
- Payam Akhavan
- Walter Arbib
- Teresa Cascioli
- George Chuvalo
- Dr. Angela Cooper Brathwaite
- Aimée Craft
- Stephen Diamond
- Nishan Duraiappah
- Mitch Frazer
- Leo Goldhar
- Suresh "Steve" Gupta
- Elise Harding-Davis
- Armand P. La Barge
- Sandra Laronde
- Dave Levac
- David I. McKay
- Barbara Morrongiello
- Lori Nikkel
- Rose Patten
- Christina Petrowska-Quilico
- Robert Poirier
- Dr. Kevin Smith
- Joan VanDuzer
- Sara Waxman

=== Order of British Columbia ===
- Chief Joe Alphonse
- Joe Average, MGC
- Brenda Baptiste
- Frances Belzberg, OC
- Dr. Debra Braithwaite
- Ajay Dilawri
- Debra Doucette (Hewson)
- Dr. Bonnie Henry
- Carol A. Lee
- James McEwen
- Andrew Petter, CM, QC
- Dolph Schluter
- Dr. Poul Sorensen
- Arran and Ratana Stephens
- Marvin Storrow, QC

=== Alberta Order of Excellence ===
- Joan Donald, CM
- Dr. Cyril Kay, OC, FRSC, FCAHS
- Murray McCann, MSM
- Dr. Barb Olson
- Dr. Merle Olson
- Dr. Greg Powell, OC, FRCPC
- Lena Heavy Shields-Russell
- Cor van Raay

=== Order of Prince Edward Island ===
- Noreen Corrigan-Murphy
- Maitland MacIsaac
- Dr. Heather Morrison

=== Order of Manitoba ===
- Steve Bell
- Franklin (Lynn) Bishop
- Ruth Christie
- Dr. Michael Eskin, CM
- Dr. Gordon Goldsborough
- Gregg Hanson, CM
- Kyle Irving
- Ava Kobrinsky
- Claudette Leclerc
- Doris Mae Oulton
- Greg Selinger
- Arni Thorsteinson

=== Order of New Brunswick ===
- Wesley Armour, CM
- Edward Barrett
- Armand Caron
- David Christie
- Madeleine Dubé
- Huberte Gautreau
- Constantine Passaris
- Dr. Jennifer Russell
- Ralph Thomas
- Elizabeth Weir

=== Order of Nova Scotia ===
- Ronald Bourgeois
- Lee Cohen
- Saeed El-Darahali
- Paula Marshall
- Wanda Robson

=== Order of Newfoundland and Labrador ===
Undress ribbon for a member of the Order of Newfoundland and Labrador

- John R. Barrett
- David Gordon Bradley
- N. Louise Bradley, CM
- Fred Budgell
- Dr. Alice M. Collins
- Marlene Creates
- Dr. Donald Bruce Dingwell, OC
- Lester C. Powell
- Dr. Ted O. Rosales

=== Order of Nunavut ===
- Maryanne Inuaraq Tattuinee
- Dorothy Atuat Tootoo

=== Order of the Northwest Territories ===
- JoAnne Deneron
- Paul Kaeser II
- Mary Effie Snowshoe

=== Order of Yukon ===
- Peter Menzies
- David Mossop
- Dr. David Storey

== Meritorious Service Decorations ==
=== Meritorious Service Cross (Civil Division) ===
Undress ribbon for Meritious Service Cross in the civilian division

- Helen Margaret (Peggy) Truscott, M.S.C. (posthumous)
- Robin Wettlaufer, M.S.C.

=== Meritorious Service Medal (Civil Division) ===
Undress ribbon for Meritious Service Medal in the civilian division

- Bassel Ramli, M.S.M.
- Omar Salaymeh, M.S.M.
- Pierre Allard, M.S.M. (posthumous)
- Annie Roy, M.S.M.
- Stephen Allen, M.S.M.
- Don Wright, M.S.M.
- Ken Zakem, M.S.M.
- Roger Augustine, M.S.M.
- Yahya Badran, M.S.M.
- Mohamed Hage, M.S.M.
- Kurt D. Lynn, M.S.M. (posthumous)
- Lauren Elizabeth Rathmell, M.S.M.
- Carolyn Elsie Louise Bateman, O.P.E.I., M.S.M.
- Joan Elaine Hoffman te Raa, M.S.M. (posthumous)
- Betty Begg-Brooks, M.S.M.
- Elyse Benoît, M.S.M.
- Maryse Bouvette, M.S.M.
- Isabelle Delisle, M.S.M. (posthumous)
- Suzanne Fitzback, M.S.M.
- Robert Gendron, M.S.M.
- Maureen Bianchini-Purvis, M.S.M.
- April Billard, M.S.M.
- Joan Bell Chaisson, M.S.M.
- Dana Bookman, M.S.M.
- Clarence Bourgoin, M.S.M.
- Alan Broadbent, C.M., M.S.M.
- Scott Bryan, M.S.M.
- William Di Nardo, M.S.M.
- William C. Brooks, M.S.M.
- Georges Edward Potvin, M.S.M.
- William Frederick George Williams, M.S.M.
- Didier Calvet, M.S.M.
- Claude Caron, M.S.M.
- Roland Case, M.S.M.
- Stephanie Case, M.S.M.
- Susan Chalmers-Gauvin, M.S.M.
- Igor Dobrovolskiy, M.S.M.
- Shannon Christensen, M.S.M.
- Diane Lee Clemons, M.S.M.
- Michael Clemons, O.Ont., M.S.M.
- Jocelyn Dianne Cousineau, M.S.M.
- Captain Médric Léo Robert Cousineau, S.C., M.S.M., C.D. (Ret'd)
- Marie-France Dubreuil, M.S.M.
- Patrice Lauzon, M.S.M.
- Jeremy Dutcher, M.S.M.
- Marilyn L. Dyck, M.S.M.
- Corey Fleischer, M.S.M.
- Jean-Martin Fortier, M.S.M.
- Serge Fournier, M.S.M.
- Robert Lessard, M.S.M.
- Jonathan Michaud, M.S.M.
- Brother Réjean Gadouas, M.S.M.
- Larry Gauthier, M.S.M.
- Rick Goodwin, M.S.M.
- James Adrian Gehrels, M.S.M. (posthumous)
- Glenn C. Stronks, M.S.M.
- Isabelle Genest, M.S.M.
- Catherine Morissette, M.S.M.
- Mathieu Ouellet, M.S.M.
- Claude B. Gingras, M.S.M.
- Art Gruenig, M.S.M.
- Robert Hughes, M.S.M.
- Colonel Robert Mark Hutchings, M.S.M., C.D., (Ret'd)
- Narmin Ismail, M.S.M.
- Brent Kaulback, M.S.M.
- Tim Kwan, M.S.M.
- Martine Laurier, M.S.M.
- Normand Martin, M.S.M.
- Pat Lazo, M.S.M.
- Steve Wilson, M.S.M.
- Brian Leavitt, M.S.M.
- Eric Rajah, A.O.E., M.S.M.
- Patricia (Patti) Leigh, O.B.C., M.S.M.
- Victoria Lennox, M.S.M.
- Cyprian Szalankiewicz, M.S.M.
- Todd McDonald, M.S.M.
- Ashley Ward, M.S.M.
- Bruce McKelvey, M.S.M.
- Janet McKelvey, O.Ont., M.S.M.
- Steve Mesler, M.S.M.
- Leigh Parise, M.S.M.
- Julia Ogina, M.S.M.
- Kelvin Redvers, M.S.M.
- T'áncháy Sarah Judith Redvers, M.S.M.
- Elaine Ruth Maxine Cormier Semkuley, M.S.M.
- Myron Semkuley, M.S.M.
- Jacques-Denis Simard, M.S.M.
- Jacques Simoneau, M.S.M.
- William J. Simpson, M.S.M., Q.C. (posthumous)
- Christopher Southin, M.S.M.
- Harry J. Stewart, M.S.M.
- Nancy Stevens, M.S.M.
- Brent Tookenay, M.S.M.
- Marian Walsh, M.S.M.
- Marion Willis, M.S.M.

=== Sovereign's Medal for Volunteers ===
Undress ribbon of the Sovereign's Medal for Volunteers

- Paulette Lenore Aamot
- Rory Allen
- Doreen June Ander
- Deborah Auchinleck
- Sandra Margaret Bartlett
- Theresa Marie Bastien
- Rémi Beaudin
- Dominique Bellemare
- Annette Bergeron
- Wilma Bianco
- Virginia Bidwell
- Pat Birchall
- Tony Birchall
- James Linscott Blake
- Ron Blechinger
- Jill Bobula
- Cathy Bonnell
- Denise Cadieux
- Elizabeth Campbell
- Dianne Ruth Campbell
- Sharon Campbell
- Robert Carr
- Shannon Carson
- Elena Catalano
- Sabrina Cataldo
- Louis Christ
- Jane Christie
- George Clements
- Geraldine Patricia Cloutier
- Carolyn Cockram
- Linda Maxine Conley
- Jennifer Paige Cook
- Sally Cooke Venne
- Barry Cornish
- Blanche Côte
- Christopher McDougal Croner
- Perry Dalton
- Maria D'Iorio
- Philippe Dugas
- Diya Duggal
- Raveena Duggal
- Barbara DuMoulin
- Derek Egan
- Hilary Feldman
- Ernest Ferne
- Jill Ferne
- William Charles Ford
- Mario Frangione
- Judy Gallant
- Maureen Gibson
- Isabel Gillissie
- Mary Lynne Golphy
- Beverly Gordon
- Kevin Lynn Graham
- Susan Graham
- Robert Groulx
- Mona Hardy
- Russell Hart
- Shelby Hayter
- Dave Hedlund
- Pam Hiensch
- John David Hind
- Lise Hodgson Madore
- Leslie Horton
- Brad Hrycyna
- D. Michael Jackson, CVO, SOM
- Hilary Johnstone
- Muhammad Azam Kahloo
- Bill Kalmakoff
- Krishan Kapila
- Brian W. Karam
- W. Douglas Keam
- Colleen Kellner
- Sandra Kerr
- Yvonne Kyle
- Krista Laberge
- Carol LaFayette-Boyd
- Gilles Landry
- Maria Lee
- Donna Leonard Robb
- Jean-Michel Longpré
- Lyn Lunsted
- Jennie MacKenzie
- Brian MacLellan
- Roger Mainville
- Donald Steve Maksymchuk
- Anne Marshall
- Randall Marusyk
- Sunita Mathur
- Daniel Matthews
- Sandi McCrory
- Raymond Charles McGill
- Michael McKay
- Ronald Francis McKay
- Donald McKinnon
- Bonnie Lynne Meadows
- Joanne Millette
- Doug Moen
- Albert Monsour
- Anna Monteduro
- Susan Morrison
- Steve Nadeau
- Donna Needham
- Janette Newcombe
- Cécile Nicole
- Annette Niven
- Primrose Paruboczy
- Richard Percy
- Vicki Plouffe
- Louise Prouse
- Roger Prouse
- Sid Robinson
- Dana Said
- Joy Saunders
- Jeff Sawatsky
- Neil Sawatzky
- Steve Scott
- Judy Shannahan
- Bernice Anna Jane Smith
- Debra Lee Smith
- Darlene Stakiw
- John Stuart
- Louise Sullivan
- Kyle Taylor
- Solange Thériault
- Ronald Theroux
- Yvonne Theroux
- Robert Thompson
- Derrick Thue
- Reginald Tweten
- Janet Uffelman
- Shelly Ullery
- Peggy Vink
- Samara Visram
- Norma Weiner
- Marion Weir
- Susan Welsh
- Janet Wilson
- Orest J. Wilura
- Travis Young
- Joanne Zuk

== Commonwealth and Foreign Orders, Decorations and Medal awarded to Canadians ==
=== From Her Majesty The Queen in Right of the Commonwealth of Australia ===
==== Public Service Medal ====
- Mr. Charles Cameron MacLachlan

==== Meritorious Unit Citation ====
- Master Warrant Officer David Allan Joseph Kennedy, C.D.
- Corporal Wayne George Tompkins (Retired)

==== Australian Operational Service Medal – Border Protection ====
- Captain Rodney John Hallsworth, C.D.

=== From Her Majesty The Queen in Right of New Zealand ===
==== Member of the New Zealand Order of Merit ====
- Ms. Janet Lynn Lane

=== From Her Majesty The Queen in Right of the United Kingdom ===
==== Member of the Most Excellent Order of the British Empire (Civil Division) ====
- Nina Kong Vickie Yue
- Nicholas Davies

==== Operational Service Medal for Iraq and Syria with Clasp ====
- Captain Jordan Gregory Rychlo
- Captain Scott C. Stewart, C.D.
- Sergeant Timothy Walter Parkes Ellis, C.D.
- Sergeant Patrick Edward Slack, C.D.

=== From the President of the Republic of Austria ===
==== Grand Decoration of Honour in Gold for Services to the Republic of Austria ====
- Clare Hutchinson

=== From the President of the Republic of Colombia ===
==== "Fe en la Causa" Military Medal, Extraordinary Category ====
- Brigadier-General Nicolas Dan Stanton, O.M.M., M.S.M., C.D.

=== From the President of the Republic of Croatia ===
==== Order of the Croatian Interlace ====
- Ms. Hazel McCallion, C.M.

=== From Her Majesty The Queen of the Kingdom of Denmark ===
==== Knight of the Royal Order of the Dannebrog ====
- Mr. André Vautour

=== From the President of the Republic of Finland ===
==== Commander of the Order of the Lion of Finland ====
- Judith M. Romanchuk

=== From the President of the French Republic ===
==== Commander of the National Order of the Legion of Honour ====
- Isabelle Hudon

==== Officer of the National Order of the Legion of Honour ====
- Ms. Céline Dion, C.C., O.Q.

==== Knight of the National Order of the Legion of Honour ====
- Mr. Yoshua Bengio, O.C.
- Mr. Régis Labeaume
- Ms. Ginette Reno, O.C., C.Q.

==== Commander of the National Order of Merit ====
- Lieutenant-General Wayne Donald Eyre, C.M.M., M.S.C., C.D.

==== Officer of the National Order of Merit ====
- Dr. Thierry Mesana

==== Knight of the National Order of Merit ====
- Ms. Rhonda Rioux
- Mr. Carl Viel
- Ms. Diane Audet
- Ms. Delphine Persouyre
- Mr. Gérard Poupée

==== Officer of the Order of Academic Palms ====
- Mr. Jacques Frémont

==== Knight of the Order of Academic Palms ====
- Ms. Carmen Bauer
- Mr. Michel Tremblay
- Mr. Jean-Charles Cachon
- Mr. Daniel Doz
- Mr. Brian Stock

==== Commander of the Order of Arts and Letters ====
- Mr. David Cronenberg, C.C., O.Ont.

==== Officer of the Order of the Arts and Letters ====
- Michèle Maheux

==== Knight of the Order of Arts and Letters ====
- Ms. Monia Chokri
- Mr. Étienne Dupuis
- Wayne Carter
- Avery Rueb

==== Knight of the Order of Agricultural Merit ====
- Jean-Francis Quaglia
- Caroline Thierry

==== National Defence Medal, Gold Echelon ====
- Lieutenant-General Walter Semianiw, C.M.M., M.S.C., C.D. (Retired)

==== National Defence Medal, Bronze Echelon ====
- Lieutenant-Commander Joseph Bruno Tremblay, C.D.
- Lieutenant-Colonel Joseph Rosaire Mario Ferland, M.S.M., C.D.
- Major Alexandre Maurice Mario Ouellet, C.D.

==== Foreign Affairs Medal of Honour, Bronze Echelon ====
- Myriam Hinojosa
- Rosa-Maria Oliveira-Torres

=== From the President of the Federal Republic of Germany ===
==== Officer's Cross of the Order of Merit of the Federal Republic of Germany ====
- Ms. Margaret Atwood, C.C., O.Ont., C.H.

=== From the President of Hungary ===
==== Officer's Cross of the Order of Merit of Hungary ====
- Ms. Anna Szenthe
- Mr. Zoltán Vass

==== Knight's Cross of the Order of Merit of Hungary ====
- Mr. Ábel Nagytóthy-Tóth

==== Gold Cross of Merit of Hungary ====
- Mr. Laszlo Szabo
- Mr. Tamás Kálmán Kontra
- Ms. Sophia Alexandra Zsigmond Szoke

=== From the President of the Italian Republic ===
==== Commander of the Order of the Star of Italy ====
- Ms. Yolanda McKimmie

=== From His Majesty The Emperor of Japan ===
==== Order of the Rising Sun, Gold Rays with Neck Ribbon ====
- Mr. David Worts

==== Order of the Rising Sun, Gold Rays with Rosette ====
- Mr. Dan Goodman
- Mr. Gaëtan Labadie
- Mr. Wu Pao-shuen (Frankie)
- Mr. Jacob Kovalio

==== Order of the Rising Sun, Gold and Silver Rays ====
- Mr. Dereck Oikawa
- Mr. Chris Spearman
- Mr. Ronald Starr
- Ms. Masako Takahatake
- Ms. Suzanne Éthier
- Mr. Wan Tat Kong

==== Order of the Rising Sun, Gold and Silver Star ====
- The Honourable David Tkachuk

==== Order of the Rising Sun, Silver Rays ====
- Ms. Keiko Belair

=== From the President of the Republic of Korea ===
==== Order of National Security Merit, Guksun Medal ====
- Lieutenant-General Wayne Donald Eyre, C.M.M., M.S.C., C.D.

==== Korea Service Medal ====
- Lieutenant-General Wayne Donald Eyre, C.M.M., M.S.C., C.D.
- Commander Samuel Edward Patchell, C.D.
- Captain Richard Thomas Detlef Spiller
- Colonel Richard Tod Strickland, C.D.
- Major Gordon James Barr, C.D.
- Master Corporal Jean-Ricardo Cleophat
- Major Shona Ann Durno Couturier
- Lieutenant-Colonel Gordon James Danylchuk, C.D.
- Lieutenant-Colonel Robert Glen Hart, C.D.
- Warrant Officer Andréanne Lise Micheline Joly, M.M.M., C.D.
- Warrant Officer Simon Joseph Pierre Labadie, C.D.
- Major Susan Adele Magill, C.D.
- Lieutenant-Commander Ji-Hwan Park, C.D.
- Colonel Stewart William Taylor, C.D.
- Sergeant Chad Edward Walker, C.D.
- Captain(N) Robert Jeffrey Watt, C.D.
- Major Christian Dominik Whelan, C.D.

=== From the Government of the Republic of Latvia ===
==== Order of the Three Stars, Fourth Class ====
- Ms. Vizma Mara Maksins

=== From His Royal Highness the Grand Duke of Luxembourg ===
==== Knight of the Order of the Oak Crown ====
- Mr. Paul Willox

=== From the Secretary General of the North Atlantic Treaty Organization ===
==== NATO Meritorious Service Medal ====
- Lieutenant-Colonel David Ross Canavan, M.S.M., C.D.
- Commodore Marie Thérèse Josée Kurtz, O.M.M., C.D.
- Colonel Timothy David Charles Marcella, M.S.M., C.D.
- Lieutenant-Colonel Allan Glen MacNeil, C.D.
- Warrant Officer Gregory J. Slate, C.D.

==== NATO Meritorious Service Medal, Second Award ====
- Mr. Scott Alfred Bruce

==== NATO Non-Article 5 Medal for the ISAF Operation ====
- Mr. Scott Alfred Bruce
- Mr. John-Paul Gravelines
- Mr. James Wood

==== NATO Non-Article 5 Medal for Operation Resolute Support ====
- Mr. Scott Alfred Bruce
- Mr. Kevin Sorenson

=== From the President of the Republic of Poland ===
==== Officer's Cross of the Order of Polonia Restituta ====
- Mr. Stefan Olbrecht

==== Knight's Cross of the Order of Polonia Restituta ====
- Mr. Wladyslaw Pilipiak

==== Cross with Swords of the Order of the Cross of Independence ====
- Mr. Zbigniew Franciszek Pierscianowski (posthumous)

==== Siberian Exiles Cross ====
- Ms. Alice Basarke
- Mr. Andrzej Dabrowski (posthumous)
- Ms. Joanna Erland
- Ms. Maria Gajdecki
- Ms. Teresa Kosierb
- Mr. Feliks Tadeusz Kosierb
- Mr. Mieczyslaw Król
- Ms. Krystyna Makomaski
- Mr. Rafal Przednówek
- Ms. Helena Szuta
- Ms. Helena Tkaczewski

=== From the President of Ukraine ===
==== Order of Merit, 3rd Class ====
- Ms. Lenna Koszarny
- Mr. Taras Bahriy

==== Cross of Ivan Mazepa ====
- Mr. Marco Levytsky
- Dr. James Rutka

=== From the President of the United States of America ===
==== Legion of Merit ====
===== Commander of the Legion of Merit =====
- Lieutenant-General Wayne Donald Eyre, C.M.M., M.S.C., C.D.

===== Officer of the Legion of Merit, Second Award =====
- Lieutenant-General Christopher John Coates, C.M.M., M.S.M., C.D.
- Lieutenant-General Joseph Christian Giles Juneau, C.M.M., M.S.M., C.D. (retired)
- Major-General Joseph Raymond Marc Gagné, O.M.M., M.S.C., M.S.M., C.D.
- Major-General David Craig Aitchison, C.D.

===== Officer of the Legion of Merit =====
- Brigadier-General Peter Kenneth Scott, C.D.
- Brigadier-General Christopher Charles Ayotte, O.M.M., C.D.
- Major-General Marie Annabelle Jennie Carignan, C.M.M., M.S.M., C.D.
- Major-General David William Lowthian, O.M.M., M.S.M., C.D. (Ret'd)
- Brigadier-General Paul James Peyton, M.S.M., C.D.

===== Legionnaire of the Legion of Merit =====
- Colonel Richard Tod Strickland, C.D.
- Colonel Stewart William Taylor, C.D.

==== Bronze Star Medal ====
- Captain Alexander J. Buck, C.D.
- Colonel Denis Pierre Gerard Guy Boucher, O.M.M., C.D.

==== Defence Meritorious Service Medal ====
- Corporal Carl William Boland
- Master Sailor Amanda Yvonne Clancy
- Captain Thomas J.H. Geilen, C.D.
- Major Andrew W. McGregor, C.D.
- Sergeant Karine Gil Georgette Christine Moreau, C.D.
- Sergeant John E. Sullivan, C.D.
- Major Kaitlin A. Baskerville, C.D.
- Major Matthew P. Coughlin
- Captain Shona Ann Durno Couturier
- Lieutenant-Colonel Gordon J. Danylchuk, C.D.
- Colonel Benoit Michel Vincent Giroux, C.D.
- Commander Stephan R. Gresmak, C.D.
- Major Rony Khalil
- Lieutenant Gabrielle M. C. L. Lajoie
- Master Warrant Officer J. G. Steve Lambert, C.D.
- Major Michael G. L. Lee, C.D.
- Major Susan Adele Magill, C.D.
- Major Tahir M. Malik, C.D.
- Major Dennis S. Maringer, C.D.
- Major Ryan W. Matthies, C.D.
- Lieutenant-Colonel Donald J. McKillop, C.D.
- Lieutenant-Colonel Shaun D. O'Leary, C.D.
- Lieutenant-Commander Jill A. L. Page, C.D.
- Lieutenant-Colonel D. R. Piers Pappin, C.D.
- Colonel J. Marcel Yvon Daniel Rivière, C.D.
- Lieutenant-Colonel Norman A. R. Ruttle, C.D.
- Captain Justin J. Salter
- Captain Mark W. Spears
- Major Kyle D. Spindler, C.D.
- Warrant Officer Bryan D. Toope, C.D.
- Lieutenant-Colonel Lisa Marie Baspaly-Hays, O.M.M., C.D.
- Captain(N) Jeffrey Allan Biddiscombe, M.M.M., C.D.
- Major Cullen Patrick Downey, M.S.M., C.D.
- Colonel Eric Sabin Joseph Joffre Fortin, C.D.
- Colonel Edward Allan Scott Gillingham, C.D.
- Major Michael Kenneth Harris, C.D.
- Major Codi Alexander Micklethwaite, C.D.
- Major Leslie Deanne Wenzel, C.D.
- Major Garrett J. Milne, C.D.
- Major Gordon James Barr, C.D.
- Colonel Timothy James Bishop, O.M.M., M.S.M., C.D.
- Major Jonathan David Vincent Bussey, C.D.
- Major Daniel David Corkum, C.D.
- Chief Warrant Officer Dwayne Nelson Earle, C.D.
- Colonel Richard Aaron Taylor Harvie, C.D. (Retired)
- Staff Sergeant Erik Howells
- Warrant Officer Andréanne Lise Micheline Joly, M.M.M., C.D.
- Chief Warrant Officer René Kiens, M.M.M., M.S.M., C.D.
- Warrant Officer Simon Joseph Pierre Labadie, C.D.
- Master Warrant Officer Patrick Timothy Love, M.M.M., C.D.
- Major Luc Pierre Martin, C.D.
- Lieutenant-Colonel Kevin Henny K. L. Ng, C.D.
- Colonel Joseph Normand Marc Parent, C.D.
- Sergeant Franco D. Pittui
- Major Scott Malcolm Sinclair, C.D.
- Major Peter Dyck Teichroeb, C.D.
- Captain(N) Michael Edward Thomson, M.S.M., C.D.

==== Meritorious Service Medal ====
- Lieutenant-Colonel A. Frédéric Guénette, C.D.
- Lieutenant-Colonel Brendan C. Insley, C.D.
- Major Michael Wayne Lang, C.D.
- Major Jack P. Nguyen, C.D.
- Lieutenant-Colonel François Perreault, C.D.
- Lieutenant-Colonel Christopher Ray Adams, C.D.
- Captain Joseph Michael S. Dussault, C.D.
- Lieutenant-Colonel Joshua Andrew Klemen, M.S.M., C.D.
- Major Maurice Paul Raymond Ricard, C.D.
- Major Malcolm Alastair McMurachy, M.M.M., C.D.
- Major Joel Douglas Levandier, C.D.
- Major Philippe Turcotte, C.D.
- Lieutenant-Colonel Theodore Bernhard Weber, C.D.
- Lieutenant-Colonel Timothy Ernest Woods, C.D.

==== Air Medal ====
- Lieutenant-Colonel Dale M. Campbell, C.D.
- Major Michael P. Garrett
- Sergeant Douglas J. James, C.D.
- Major Ian R. McDonald, C.D.
- Major Stephen Angus McLean, C.D.
- Master Corporal Zachary D. Niemelainen, C.D.
- Captain Viktor Antun Spanovic
- Captain Dennis Gordon Williams
- Major Justin J. Boates, C.D.
- Major David J. Foyers, C.D.
- Sergeant Kathryn M. Gautier, C.D.
- Captain Robert T. Kropaczewski
- Warrant Officer Raymond E. C. Moggy, C.D.
- Captain Niko P. J. Politis, C.D.
- Sergeant Patrick E. Porter, C.D.
- Master Corporal Francis D. Roller
- Major Brian James Coyle, C.D.
- Master Corporal Devin Edward Tuck

===== Air Medal, Second Oak Leaf Cluster =====
- Major Michael P. Garrett
- Major Ian R. McDonald, C.D.
- Captain Alexander J. Buck, C.D.
- Chief Warrant Officer Joseph Dominique Georges Martin, C.D.
- Lieutenant-Colonel Joseph Daniel Steeve Veillette, C.D.

===== Air Medal, First Oak Leaf Cluster =====
- Major Michael P. Garrett
- Major Ian R. McDonald, C.D.
- Major David A. Murphy, C.D.
- Colonel Donald Thomas Saunders, C.D.

== Errata of Commonwealth and Foreign Orders, Decorations and Medal awarded to Canadians ==
=== Corrections from 26 June 2021 ===
The notice published on page 2958 of the 31 October 2020 issue of the Canada Gazette, Part I, contained an error. Accordingly, the following modifications are made.

- Delete the following award: From Her Majesty The Queen in Right of the United Kingdom of the United Kingdom, Officer of the Most Excellent Order of the British Empire to Mr. Tony Sau-wo Yu, Replace with the following: Member of the Most Excellent Order of the British Empire (Civil Division) to Mr. Tony Sau-wo Yu.

The notice published on page 812 of the February 27, 2021 issue of the Canada Gazette, Part I, contained an error. Accordingly, the following modifications are made.

- Delete the following award: From His Majesty The Emperor of Japan, the Order of the Rising Sun, Gold and Silver Rays to Mr. Dereck Oikawa, Replace with the following: the Order of the Rising Sun, Gold and Silver Rays to Mr. Stephen Dereck Oikawa
