= George Paul =

George Paul may refer to:

- George Howard Paul (1826–1890), American newspaperman, businessman and politician
- George St Paul (1562–1613), English politician
- George Vivian Paul, Indian standup comedian
- Sir George Paul, 2nd Baronet (1746–1820), English prison reformer and philanthropist
- George S Paul, Indian writer, essayist and music journalist
- Sir George Graham Paul, British jurist

== See also ==
- Paul George (disambiguation)
