= George Waters =

George Waters may refer to:

- George Waters (businessman) (1916–2003), pioneer in the credit card industry
- George Waters (MP) (1827–1905), Member of Parliament for Mallow, Ireland
- George Alexander Waters (1820–1903), British Navy officer
- George Roger Waters (born 1943), full name of English musician Roger Waters

== See also ==
- George Walters (disambiguation)
- George Watters (soldier) (1904–1980), Scottish miner and labourer who fought in the Spanish Civil War
- George Watters II (born 1949), American motion picture sound editor
