= Tony George (disambiguation) =

Tony George or Anthony George may refer to:

- Anthony George (1921–2005), American actor
- Anthony C. George (1938–2024), Grenadian artist
- Anthony Hastings George (1886–1944), British diplomat
- Tony George (born 1959), American auto racing executive
- Tony George (American football) (born 1975), American football defensive back
- Tony George (politician), American politician from Missouri
- Tony George (weightlifter) (1919–2006), New Zealand weightlifter

== See also ==
- George Anthony (disambiguation)
