= George Walter (disambiguation) =

George Walter (1928–2008) was a politician.

George Walter is also the name of:

- George Walter (1790–1854), English railway entrepreneur
- George Walter of George Walter Brewing Company
- Walter Goehr (1903-1960), German composer, who used this pseudonym in Britain

== See also ==
- George Walther (disambiguation)
- George Walters (disambiguation)
- Walter George (disambiguation)
