= George David (disambiguation) =

George David (born 1942) is the former head of United Technologies Corporation.

George David may also refer to:

- George A. David (born 1937) Greek Cypriot Coca-Cola executive

== See also ==
- David George (disambiguation)
- George Davis (disambiguation)
