= Senator George =

Senator George may refer to:

== Members of the United States Senate ==
- James Z. George (1826–1897), U.S. Senator from Mississippi from 1881 to 1897
- Walter F. George (1878–1957), U.S. Senator from Georgia from 1922 to 1957

== United States state senate members ==
- Gary George (Oregon politician), Oregon State Senate
- Gary George (Wisconsin politician) (born 1954), Wisconsin State Senate
- Grover C. George (1893–1976), Minnesota State Senate
- Larry George (born c. 1968), Oregon State Senate
- Melvin Clark George (1849–1933), Oregon State Senate
- Tom George (born 1956), Michigan State Senate
- Walter George (Nebraska politician) (1929–1996), Nebraska State Senate
