= George Walters =

George Walters may refer to:

- George Walters (VC) (1829–1872), English recipient of the Victoria Cross
- George Walters (footballer) (1939–2015), Scottish footballer
- George Walters (MP) for Barnstaple

== See also ==
- George Walter (disambiguation)
- George Waters (disambiguation)
