= Gorgeous =

Gorgeous may refer to:

== Animals ==
- Gorgeous barb, a species of cyprinid fish native to Africa
- Gorgeous bushshrike, a bird in the family Malaconotidae
- Gorgeous prawn goby, a species of goby native to tropical reefs of the Indian Ocean to the western Pacific Ocean

== Film and television ==
- Gorgeous (film), a 1999 film starring Jackie Chan
- Gorgeous Enterprises, a London-based film production company
- "Gorgeous" (Juliet Bravo), a 1981 television episode

== Music ==
- The Gorgeous, a Canadian rock band

=== Albums ===
- Gorgeous (808 State album), 1993
- Gorgeous (Guttermouth album), 1999
- Gorgeous (EP), by F.Cuz, 2010

=== Songs ===
- "Gorgeous" (Doja Cat song), 2025
- "Gorgeous" (Kanye West song), 2010
- "Gorgeous" (Taylor Swift song), 2017
- "Gorgeous", from the play The Apple Tree, 1966
- "Gorgeous", by Alanis Morissette from Jagged Little Pill (20th Anniversary Edition), 2015
- "Gorgeous", by Baby Keem from The Melodic Blue, 2021
- "Gorgeous", by Eighteen Visions from Vanity, 2002
- "Gorgeous", by Idina Menzel from I Stand, 2008
- "Gorgeous", by Illenium from Ascend, 2019
- "Gorgeous", by Jeffree Star from Beauty Killer, 2009
- "Gorgeous", by Katy Perry featuring Kim Petras from 143, 2024
- "Gorgeous", by Saint Jhn, 2020
- "Gorgeous", by Slowthai from Nothing Great About Britain, 2019
- "Gorgeous", by X Ambassadors from VHS, 2015

== People ==
- Gorgeous (comedian) (born 1978), Japanese comedian
- Vincent Basciano (born 1959), nicknamed Vinny Gorgeous, American mobster
- Jimmy Garvin (born 1952), ring name "Gorgeous" Jimmy Garvin, American retired professional wrestler
- Gigi Gorgeous (born 1992), Canadian internet personality, actress, and model

== See also ==
- Gorgeous George (disambiguation)
- Gorgeous Ladies of Wrestling, women's professional wrestling promotion
- Jorgeous
- Physical attractiveness
