= Joe Walters (Scottish footballer) =

Scottish footballer

Personal information
- Date of birth: 10 February 1935
- Place of birth: Glasgow, Scotland
- Date of death: 19 July 2017 (aged 82)
- Position: Wing half

Youth career
- Glasgow Perthshire

Senior career*
Years	Team	Apps	(Gls)
1956–1962	Clyde	91	(1)
1962–1964	Albion Rovers	51	(3)
1964–1965	Ards	0	(0)
1965–1966	Stenhousemuir		
Total		142	(4)

International career
1960	Scottish Football League XI	1	(0)
- * Club domestic league appearances and goals

Joe Walters (1935–2017) was a Scottish footballer, who played as a wing half.

Walters was best known for his time at Clyde where he made over 230 appearances, and was part of the 1957–58 Scottish Cup winning team. He then moved to Albion Rovers. His brother, George Walters, played for Clyde and Oldham Athletic.

Walters died on 19 July 2017 at the age of 82.
