= Tony George (politician) =

American politician

Tony George is an American former politician.

Tony George won election to the Missouri House of Representatives' 74th district in 2006, defeating Steve Webb and Ingrid Owens in a Democratic Party primary to succeed his father, the term-limited Thomas E. George, in office. Tony George ran for reelection in 2008, facing Webb for a second time. George lost the electoral rematch and stepped down as state representative after completing a single two-term term. George faced Webb and another candidate, Don Zykan, during the 2010 primaries, and lost.
