= Marilyn McHarg =

Canadian activist

Marilyn McHarg, CM OOnt is a humanitarian executive. She was President and CEO of Dignitas International, as well as a founding member and general director of the Canadian section of Médecins Sans Frontières (MSF) / Doctors Without Borders, an independent medical humanitarian organization.

== Biography ==
With a master's degree in applied sciences in nursing (1984–1987) from McGill University in Montréal, McHarg spent nine years in Africa from 1991 until 2000 working for MSF as a field nurse in Uganda, a training consultant and a medical coordinator in Sudan, and a medical coordinator as well as Head of Mission in South Sudan and Liberia.

Following nine years in the field identifying humanitarian needs, translating medical policy into project activities, supervising financial management and logistical support, and implementing project activities ranging from health education and basic health services to water and sanitation services, relief distributions, and famine response, McHarg was based in Europe as Operational Director for MSF in Holland and later as Director of Operations with MSF in Geneva from 2000 until 2006 with responsibility for missions in 20 countries.

Prior to her work with MSF, McHarg was a registered nurse at Women's College Hospital and Sunnybrook Medical Centre in Toronto and a research assistant and laboratory technologist at St. Joseph's Hospital in Hamilton, Ontario and research assistant at Queen's University in Kingston, Ontario.

In addition to her master's degree, McHarg graduated with a Bachelor of Science: life sciences and psychology from Queen’s University in Kingston, Ontario (1978–1983) and holds certificates in tropical medicine, critical care, quality assurance and nursing audits. In 1996 she obtained a pilot’s license.

In acknowledgement of her humanitarian work, she was awarded the Golden Jubilee in 2002. She received an honorary Doctor of Laws degree and the Alumni Humanitarian award from Queen’s University, as well as an award of distinction from the Cenntenial Foundation in 2008. In 2011, McHarg was named as a Woman of the Year by Chatelaine magazine, and in 2012 she received an honorary diploma from Niagara College and the Successful Canadian Women award from Adsum in Nova Scotia. In 2015, she was made a member of the Order of Ontario and in the 2021 Canadian Honours List, she was made a member of the Order of Canada.
