= Thomas George =

Thomas George may refer to:

- Thomas George (Australian politician) (born 1949), member of the New South Wales Legislative Assembly
- Thomas E. George, American politician from Missouri
- Thomas F. George, chancellor and professor of chemistry and physics at the University of Missouri-St. Louis
- Thomas N. George (born 1938), American politician from Massachusetts
- Tom George (born 1956), American politician from Michigan
- Thomas George (rower) (born 1994), British rower
- Thomas St George (1615–1703), English officer of arms
- Thomas St George (Clogher MP), Irish politician
- Thomas R. St. George, American author
- Tom George (director), British director of film and television
