= George Walther =

George Walther may refer to:

- George Walther Sr. (1876–1961), American inventor, engineer and businessman
- George H. Walther (1828–1895), American politician and soldier

== See also ==
- George Walter (1928–2008), Antiguan politician
