= Henry George (disambiguation) =

Henry George (1839–1897) was an American political economist.

Henry George may also refer to:

- Henry George Jr. (1862–1916), member of the United States House of Representatives
- Henry George (cyclist) (1891–1976), Belgian track cyclist
- Harry L. George (1849–1923), American collector of Native American artifacts

== People with the given names ==
- Henry George Bohn (1796–1884), British publisher
- Henry George Bonavia Hunt (1847–1917), founder of the Trinity College of Music
- Henry George Carroll (1865–1939), Canadian politician, jurist and Lieutenant-Governor of Quebec
- Henry George Glyde (1906–1998), Canadian painter and art educator
- Henry George Kendall (1874–1965), English sea captain
- Henry George Lackner (1851–1925), Ontario doctor and political figure
- Henry George Lamond (1885–1969), Australian farmer and writer
- Henry George Lyons (1864–1944), British geologist
- Henry George Raverty (1825–1906), British Indian Army officer and linguist
- Henry George Smith (1852–1924), Australian chemist
- Henry George Ward (1797–1860), English diplomat and politician

== See also ==
- George Henry (disambiguation)
- Sir Henry St George (1581–1644), English officer of arms
- Sir Henry St George, the younger (1625–1715), his son, English officer of arms
