= George Henry =

George Henry may refer to:

- George Henry (baseball) (1863–1934), baseball player
- George Henry (painter) (1858–1943), Scottish painter
- George Morrison Reid Henry (1891–1983), entomologist and ornithologist
- George Stewart Henry (1871–1953), farmer, businessman and politician
- M. George Henry, bishop of Western North Carolina in the Episcopal Church
- Bunky Henry (1944–2018), professional golfer
- Maungwudaus (1811–1888), went by the name George Henry

== See also ==
- Henry George (disambiguation)
