= George Anthony =

George Anthony may refer to:

- George T. Anthony (1824–1896), seventh governor of Kansas
- George Anthony (cricketer) (1875–1907), English cricketer
- George Anthony (footballer) (1904–1971), Australian rules footballer for Footscray
- George Anthony (journalist) (born 1940), Canadian entertainment journalist
- George Wilfred Anthony (1810–1859), English landscape painter, art teacher and art critic
- George Anthony, grandfather of Caylee Anthony
