= Walter George =

Walter George may refer to:

- Walter George (athlete) (1858–1943), British runner
- Walter George (cricketer) (1847–1938), English cricketer
- Walter F. George (1878–1957), U.S. senator and judge from the state of Georgia
- Walter George (Nebraska politician) (1929–1996)
- W. L. George (1882–1926), English writer
- Walter Sykes George (1881–1962), English architect
- Wally George (1931–2003), American conservative radio and television commentator

== See also ==
- George Walter (disambiguation)
