= Susan George =

Susan George may refer to:

- Susan George (actress) (born 1950), English film and television actress
- Susan George (political scientist) (1934–2026), French and American political and social scientist
- Susan R. George, Canadian molecular pharmacologist and neuroendocrinologist
- Susan Elizabeth George (born 1949), American writer

== See also ==
- Suzane George (active from 2007), Indian television actress
- Suzy George, American attorney and foreign policy advisor
