= George A. David =

Greek Cypriot businessman (born 1937)

George Alkiviades David OBE, MFR (Greek: Γεώργιος Α. Δαυίδ; born 10 June 1937) is a Greek Cypriot businessman. He served as chairman of the board of directors of Coca-Cola HBC AG from 1981 to 2016. He later became chairman emeritus. In 2021, he was appointed a Companion of the Order of St Michael and St George (CMG).

== Early life and education ==
David was born in Petra, Cyprus. He attended the English School in Nicosia and Lindisfarne College in Wales, and graduated from the University of Edinburgh with a degree in commerce in 1959. He is a Regent of the University of Edinburgh.

== Career ==
David served as chairman of the board of directors of Coca-Cola HBC AG from 1981 to 2016.

David was a board member of Titan Cement Co. SA from 2001 to 2013. He served as chairman of the board of EFG Eurobank from 2013 to 2014. He has also served as a board member of Petros Petropoulos S.A.

=== Public and charitable activity ===
David has held trustee and advisory roles connected with educational and cultural organisations. He has chaired the board of the Center for Asia Minor Studies since 2009. Since 2013, he was also President of the Greek Committee of the A. G. Leventis Foundation; having been a Trustee before. and has served as president of its Greek Committee since 1981. He is listed as a co-founder of The Hellenic Initiative. The George David Family Scholarships support postgraduate study at the University of Edinburgh for students from Greece or Cyprus.

=== Agriculture ===
David has supported scholarship programmes and educational initiatives connected with institutions in Cyprus, Greece and the United Kingdom.

David established the Atsas Farm project in Cyprus. The project has been described as promoting regenerative agriculture and offering training activities.

=== Honours and recognition ===
In 2021, David was appointed a Companion of the Order of St Michael and St George (CMG). He has also received honorary doctorates and other forms of recognition from academic institutions in Greece and Cyprus. In 2014, he received an ALBA "Business Unusual" award for business internationalisation. In 2009, David was appointed an Officer of the Order of the British Empire (OBE). He received the Medal of the Order of the Federal Republic of Nigeria (MFR) for his services to the Nigerian nation in 2008.
