= George Walther Sr. =

American inventor, engineer and businessman (1876–1961)

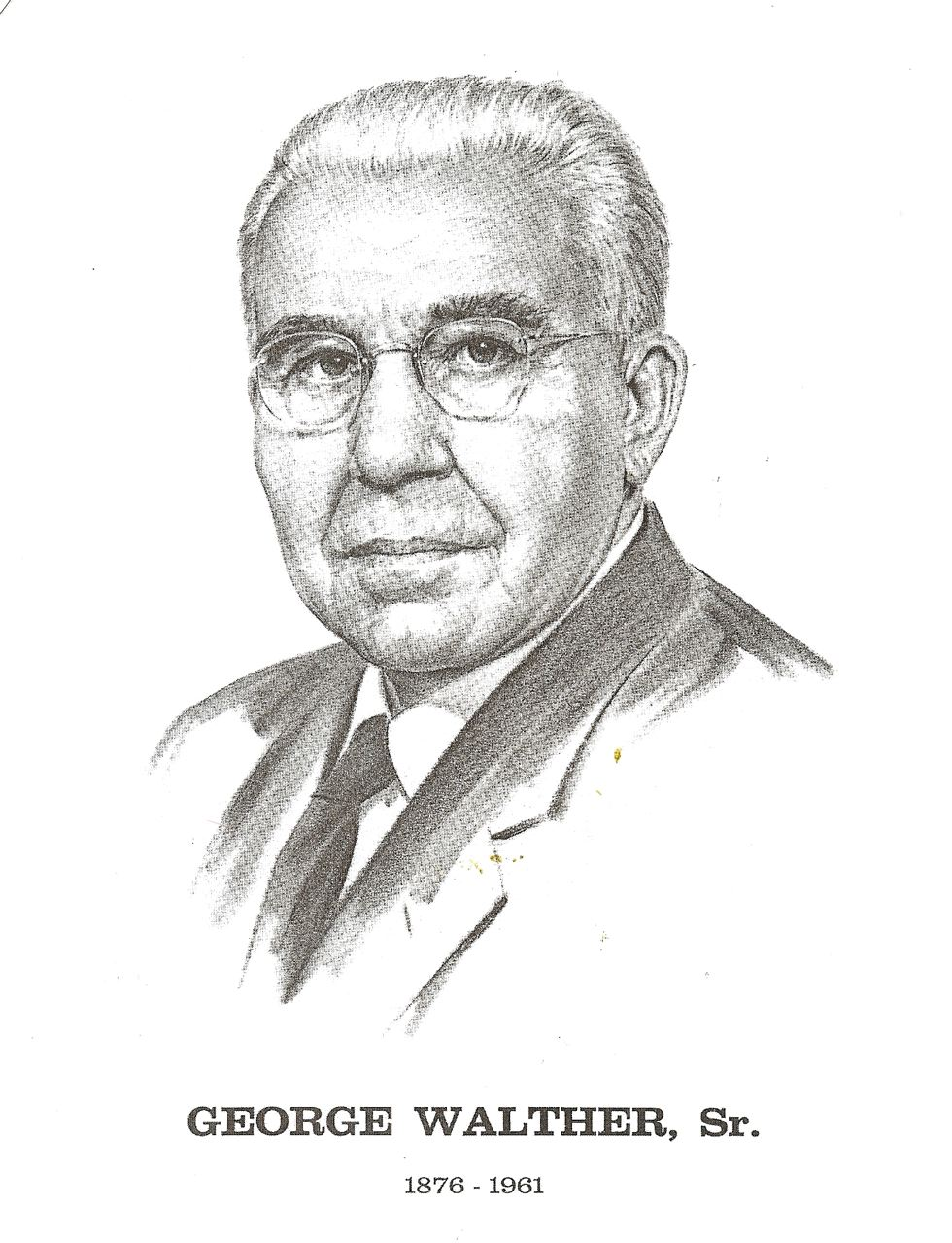
- Tribute of Walther
- Born: George Walther; August 13, 1876; Steinbach-Michelstadt, German Empire
- Died: April 10, 1961 (aged 84); Dayton, Ohio, U.S.
- Education: Michelstadt Technical Institute, Self-educated via personal co-op jobs at mid-west foundries
- Occupation(s): Inventor, Engineer, Businessman
- Known for: Patent for first successful cast steel wheel, patents for engineering advances for brake drums, fifth wheels and landing legs for trucking industry
- Spouse: Katie Nicholas
- Children: Elizabeth, George Jr., John, James, Gretchen, Jacob, David, Mary Jane, Daniel, William, Richard, Fredrick
- Parent(s): Heinrich and Elizabeth Walther
- Awards: Honorary Doctor of Engineering from University of Dayton (1958)

George Walther Sr. (August 13, 1876 – April 10, 1961) was an American inventor, engineer, businessman, civic leader and the holder of over 100 patents for truck wheels, brake drums, fifth wheels, and landing gear/legs for the trucking industry. He was the founder of the Dayton Steel Foundry.

Walther developed the first practical cast steel wheel for solid rubber tires. This was a basic but critical contribution to the evolution of the early trucking industry and the U.S. Army trucks in World War I.

Walther followed the design of the cast steel wheel for solid rubber tires with the design of a cast steel wheel for pneumatic tires and then the design of an improved brake drum. When semi-trailer semi trailer trucks were developed, he designed improved versions of the fifth wheel and landing legs for semi-trailer trucks. Walther's engineering skills resulted in patents for many developments of truck wheels, brake drums, fifth wheels, and landing legs that have helped to expand the role of trucks in the transportation industry.

== Early life in Germany ==
George Walther was born on August 13, 1876, in the industrial German city of Steinbach-Michelstadt, in the Grand Duchy of Hesse, in the German Empire. The two cities, separated only by a railroad, were small: Michelstadt was the larger, with 1,500 people, and Steinbach, home of the Walthers, had 700 residents.

The son of Heinrich and Elizabeth Walther, Walther was number 5 of 7 children. The Walther boys, according to the custom of the day, started their apprentice training early. Walther was fascinated with foundry work. He started to work in an iron foundry helping fashion solid iron wheels for mine cars.

Toward the close of the 19th century in the Grand Duchy of Hesse, German Empire, two teenagers, Walther and his brother Jacob, one an apprentice molder and the other an apprentice pattern maker, dreamed of opportunity in the country across the Atlantic Ocean.

In 1892 the two youths took their dreams to their father. Many other German fathers were hearing the same requests "We want to go to America." Their father considered the request carefully and then decided that the two boys could go to America to live with his brother Jacob in Dayton, Ohio. Their father borrowed the money to pay for their passage, signing a personal note as security.

== Coming to America ==
Walther was 16 years old when he and his brother, 17, arrived in Dayton, Ohio, in 1892 to live with their uncle. Their early training as apprentice molders and pattern makers in the German foundry that made wheels for mine cars helped them find jobs. Within six months they sent their father the passage money he had borrowed to allow them to come to America.

During the day Walther worked as an apprentice iron molder at the Dayton shop of McHose and Lyon Company, manufacturers of building columns and ornamental iron. His brother found a job with Barney and Smith, manufacturers of railroad cars. After work Walther attended the Y.M.C.A. night school. Later he enrolled in the International Correspondence School, a home mail course.

After being in the United States for the required five continuous years, Walther became a U.S. citizen on October 17, 1899.

It was not all work and no play for Walther. He somehow found the time for active participation in sports. He became interested in the sport of the day: bicycling. He was an active bicyclist and won a number of prizes in bicycle racing. In 1897 Walther was the Ohio State 5-mile Champion and in 1899 won the title of Ohio State 1-mile Champion with a winning time of 2 minutes 32 3/5 seconds. On the same day Walther and C.G. Wagner won the 5-mile Tandem race.

Ten years after he had left for America, in 1902, Walther returned to Germany to further his education. He enrolled in the Technical School of Michelstadt and spent a year of intensive study. After a year at the Technical School of Michelstadt over, Walther boarded a ship to America and returned to Dayton in 1903.

Walther created his own foundry self-study or coop program to study the foundry business by getting jobs at foundry to foundry throughout the Midwest. Walther's private "co-oping" took him into iron and steel foundries in Cincinnati, Hamilton, Pittsburgh and Milwaukee. He watched, asked questions and listened to old foundry men ... he was learning the foundry business.

Walther became convinced there were business opportunities in the steel foundry business. He knew there were only two steel foundries in Ohio and none in the Dayton area, where his brother was working. So Walther returned to Dayton with a plan to create the Dayton Steel Foundry Company.

== Dayton Steel Foundry ==
In 1905 Walther and his brother along with two others, Geo. Martin and Mr. Graham, formed a partnership, with a thousand dollars each. Walther's share was one acre of land that he purchased on South Broadway.

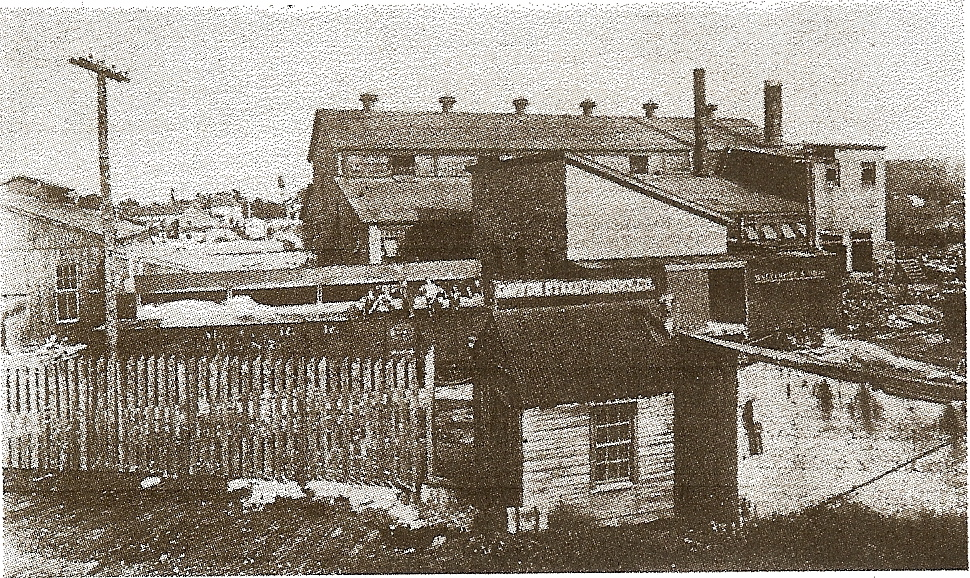
The first photograph of Dayton Steel Foundry. The small shanty in the foreground is the office. The foundry building is in the background.

The Dayton Steel Foundry was built on land that was previously a corn field at the intersection of Miami Chapel Road and South Broadway Street in Dayton, Ohio. The foundry initially consisted of a tiny, ten by eight foot shanty for an office and a small building for a foundry opened for work in the spring of 1905.

The foundry initially used a crucible steel melting process. Scrap steel metal was melted in crucibles in oil furnaces. The furnace was lined with fire brick and had a steel cover which was removed for a melter to take a crucible with molten steel from the furnace. The melter was protected by an asbestos suit and gloves as he had to stand right over the intense heat to carefully grab the crucibles with tongs without breaking them. With several employees the two brothers handled the melting and molding. Many a night Walther slept in a hammock in the foundry because he couldn't leave the work.

Convinced that the infant automobile industry had a good future, Walther and his brother concentrated on small steel castings for passenger cars, many of which were manufactured in Indianapolis and a few in Dayton.

After a few years, the two partners, Martin and Graham, who had more assets than Walther and his brother, felt their other assets might be endangered as partners in Dayton Steel Foundry and were interested in withdrawing from the partnership. Walther then borrowed money to buy their two interests. In 1909 the Dayton Steel Foundry was incorporated by Walther and his brother with $500,000 common stock and $250,000 preferred stock.

Walther and his brother were continuously looking to improve the foundry operations. In 1911 the Dayton Steel Foundry installed a 2-ton converter and changed from crucible steel melting to making steel by the converter process. While the Dayton Steel Foundry made steel castings by the converter process, Walther and his brother monitored new developments on electric furnaces.

Dayton Steel Foundry installed its first electric furnace to make steel melted by electricity in 1916. The electric furnace was one of the first in the entire country. As demand for Dayton Steel Truck Wheels increased, a second electric furnace was installed in 1918 and a third in 1922.

== Self-starter housing casting ==
Walther had both personal and business relationships with other Dayton business leaders of his era. Among these was Charles Kettering.

Kettering was an American inventor and the founder of Delco (Dayton Engineering Laboratories Company). Among Kettering's most famous inventions was the automotive self-starter.

The last step in creating the self-starter was to create the housing to enclose the electrical system, or self-starter. The self-starter housing had to be strong to not crack from bumps in roads. Kettering contacted a new local company, the Dayton Steel Foundry. Walther was able to quickly create a mold to create a housing casting to enclose the self-starter.

Kettering explained to Walther that until Delco actually had an order for the self-starter, he did not have any money to pay for the initial self-starter housing casting. Kettering offered to give Walther shares of his new company, Delco, instead of money. Walther replied that he could wait. Kettering received an order from Cadillac for the Delco self-starter and Dayton Steel Foundry manufactured thousands of self-starter housing castings.

== Dayton steel wheel patent ==
The Dayton Steel Foundry Company focused on steel castings for the automobile industry. Sales began to climb and soon Walther was spending most of his time traveling around the country selling castings for passenger cars.

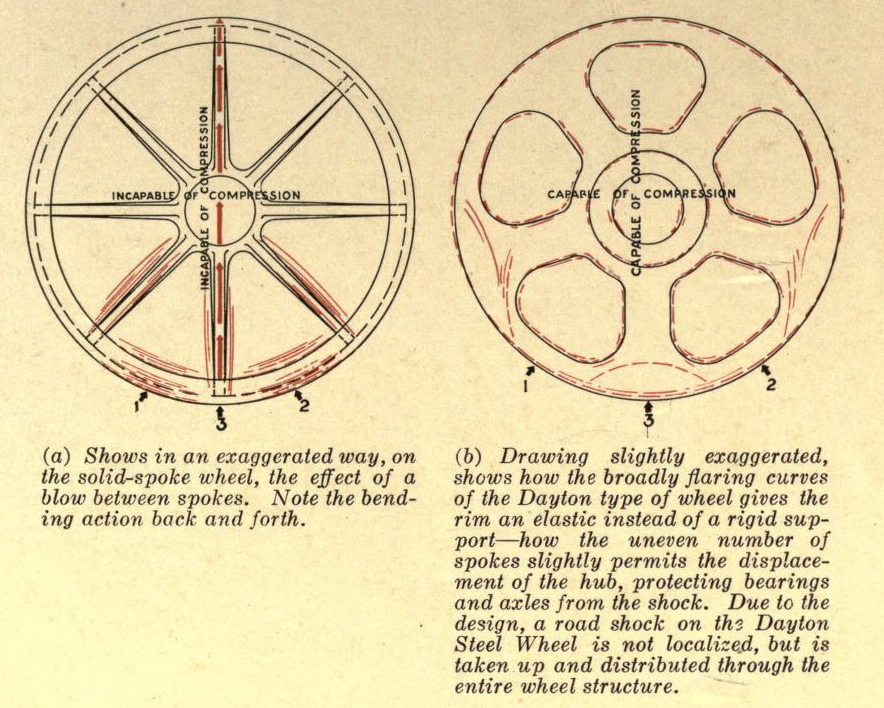
George Walther designed a wheel with an odd number of spokes to better distribute cargo weight and withstand road shock.

Around 1910 Walther heard talk about a new vehicle in the automotive industry - trucks. Walther listened more and more to discussions about trucks, especially at White Motor Company and Packard Motor Company. Walther reasoned, if Dayton Steel Foundry could manufacture castings for automobiles, the trucks should offer more opportunities for steel casting sales.

Initially wooden-spoke wheels were being used on passenger cars and these were used on the first trucks. The wheels were not satisfactory, but they were the only wheels available. Walther heard that the White Motor Company was looking at a cast steel wheel that had been made in Belgium. Walther was able to see the Belgium steel wheel at the White Motor Company. A look at the wheel and Walther's engineering knowledge convinced him that this wheel would break if it were jarred. Walther discussed it over with his brother, telling him that he was certain that he could design and build a wheel that would not break.

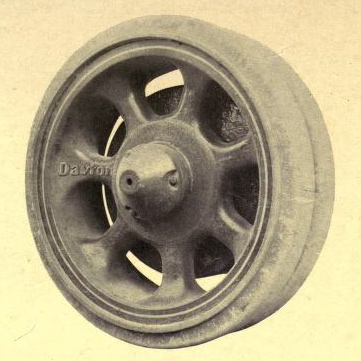
The Dayton Steel Wheel featured an odd number of spokes that were hollow steel with sweeping curves where the spoke joined the rim.

Existing wheels with either 6 or 8 wooden or solid steel spokes would break from either the weight of the cargo or from jarring from bumps in uneven roads. Walther designed a wheel with an odd number of spokes, either 5 or 7, that would better distribute the weight of the cargo across the truck wheels and axles.

They decided to test Walther's design, and two years later, in 1912, the Dayton Steel Foundry produced a cast steel cruciform spoke-type wheel that used solid rubber tires for the White Motor Company. The Dayton Steel Wheel featured an odd number of spokes that were hollow steel with sweeping curves where the spoke joined the rim.

This opened new horizons for the Dayton Steel Foundry to an entirely new industry – trucks. The wooden spoke wheel was on its way out. A patent was granted for the first practical cast steel wheel for solid rubber tires to Walther and the Dayton Steel Foundry on December 13, 1913.

This first patent marked the beginning of more than 100 trucking industry patents that were to be granted to Walther and the Dayton Steel Foundry.

== World War I – U.S. Army Liberty trucks ==
One of the first big customers for the Dayton Steel Wheel was the U.S. Army. By the time the forecast of World War I started to rumble in Europe, faster and better modes of travel became a major challenge in Europe and this country. In August 1914, the different war boards of the Allies in Europe sent an urgent request to the U. S. for heavy-duty trucks. A huge increase in the number of trucks was needed for logistics support in a war against Germany. Trucks were needed to carry supplies; food, medical supplies, and ammunition.

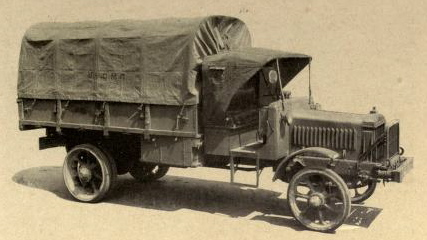
U.S. Army World War 1 Liberty Truck. Note the 7-spoke wheels made by the Dayton Steel Foundry

When war exploded in 1914, the United States Government issued a call for better truck wheels. Walther heard this and by 1916 was ready to submit his ideas to the War Department. Walther had developed a cast steel, hollow-spoke wheel to be used with a solid rubber tire. It was the first of its kind. Walther carried this wheel on the train to Washington where he presented it to the War Department.

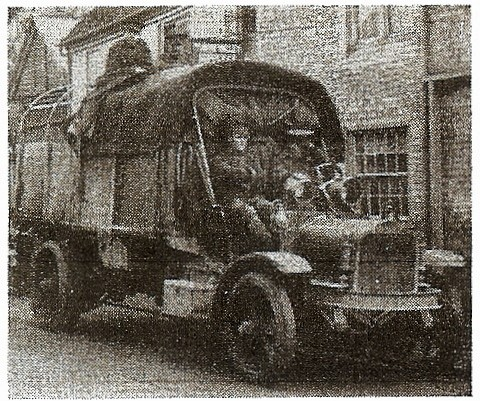
Three ton White Motors U.S. Army truck with Dayton Steel Wheels in a French village during World War I.

The War Department formed a committee to study how to design and build the best Army truck. Walther was invited to be a member. It was here that he presented his wheel, along with other manufacturers. Two Walther wheels, one with 7 and one with 5 spokes tested better than competing wheels with 6 or 8 spokes. The Walther 7 spoke wheel became the standard for the Army's famous Class B quartermaster Liberty trucks and Government four-wheel trailers. The Walther 5 spoke wheel was used on Class A Army trucks. These wheels were produced under sub-contract for White Motors, Mack, General Motors Truck Company and several smaller companies.

The Standard B "Liberty" Truck was a United States Army vehicle used in World War I. The Liberty Truck was designed by the Motor Transport section of the Quartermaster Corps in cooperation with the members of the Society of Automotive Engineers. Production of the 3–5 ton truck began in 1917, and the first models appeared ten weeks after the design was standardized. Of the almost 9,500 produced by 15 manufacturers, more than 7,500 were sent overseas. The specs for the wheels for the Liberty Truck were identical to the Dayton Steel Wheel.

By the end of World War I, Dayton Steel Foundry was producing not only cast steel wheels but also gun mounts and other related castings for both the U.S. Government and the Allies. At this time that the Walther brothers began to see the vision of the future for the Dayton Steel Foundry - truck wheels. The world would soon roll on cast steel wheels by the thousands.

== Post World War I business expansion ==
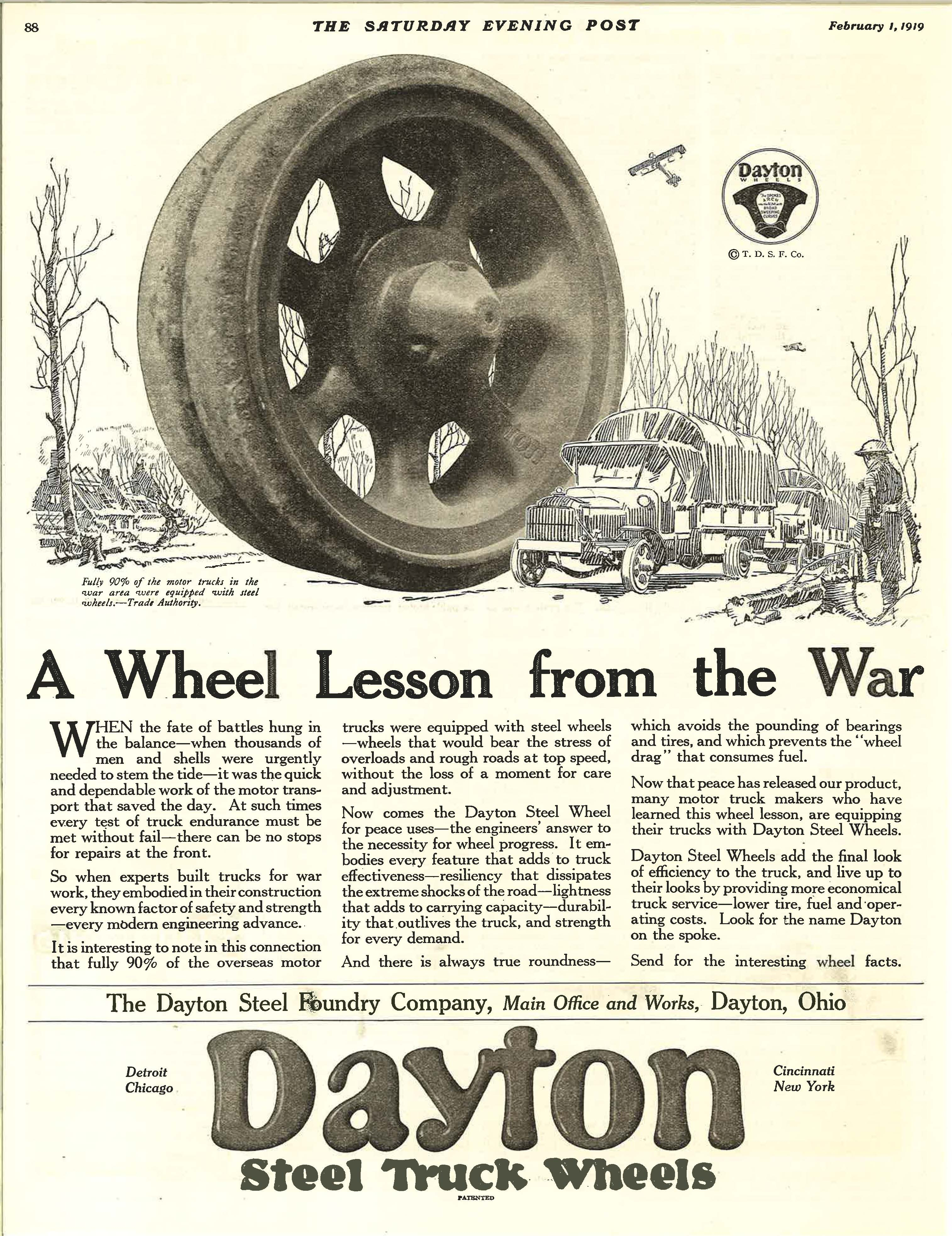
Success of Dayton Steel Truck Wheel in World War I prompted Dayton Steel Foundry advertisement in Saturday Evening Post.

After the war, Walther found a ready market for his wheels. The truck manufactures that built the U.S. Army's trucks were familiar with the quality of the Dayton Steel Wheels.

Walther authorized a series of advertisements in major magazines such as the Saturday Evening Post to promote the Dayton Steel Truck Wheel. Sales were good. The success of the U.S. Army Liberty Truck with Dayton Steel Truck Wheels did much to establish the good name of the Dayton Steel Foundry throughout the trucking industry.

Under Walther's leadership, Dayton Steel Foundry became the world's largest manufacture of steel truck wheels. To recognize this market leadership, Walther announced a contest for truck drivers and fleet owners for the best suggestions and ideas for reducing operating costs in motor transportation. This contest was advertised in major magazines such as Popular Science.

Companies that used and stayed with the Dayton Steel Wheels included: White Motors, Mack, Federal, Brockway, Pierce-Arrow, Garford, American-LaFrance, Trailmobile, Fruehauf Trailer, GMC and many others.

== Pneumatic tires replace solid rubber tires ==
Soon after the war ended, troubles developed on solid rubber tires on commercial vehicles traveling at higher speeds. Walther was approached by Firestone to design and manufacture a wheel including tire rims for what was called the Giant Pneumatic Tire.

Walther had been thinking about wheel designs for pneumatic tires because the increased speed of commercial vehicles was causing problems with the solid rubber tires. He believed that pneumatic tires were the coming thing. He studied everything that had been done in the development of wheels for pneumatic tires. Among the war equipment exhibited in Washington after World War I was dual pneumatic wheel equipment made by Michelin Tire Company of France. Walther studied these wheels and the ones being made by Firestone in this country. He felt that both could be vastly improved.

Walther's first wheel designed for pneumatic tires included an aperture for valve stems from the inner tube for the pneumatic tire. Walther was granted a patent for this wheel on January 6, 1925.

Walther was not satisfied with his initial wheel design for pneumatic tires. The wheel had limited space for a brake drum. In addition, the design was difficult to handle, both in the foundry and the machine shop. George Walther set about improving his new wheel.

Walther new design allowed plenty of room for the brake drum and made for much simpler casting and machining. To the truck owner and operator, Walther's new wheel meant easier handling in mounting and dismounting rims and tires. Patent # 1.665.485 was granted on this wheel on April 10, 1928.

Walther's initial cast steel wheel designed for solid rubber tires lasted for about 10 years. In the 1920s the pneumatic tire with an inner tube provided significant performance advantages over solid rubber tires. Walther focused on truck wheels for pneumatic tires. Over the next 50 years, Walther was granted multiple additional patents for new and improved truck wheels.

== Brake drums ==
During the Dayton Steel Foundry's first 20 years the foundry did not produce brake drums on a commercial scale. Walther became interested in the development of brake drum design and construction. He studied all types of brake drums. He became familiar with the design, construction, and metallurgical problems involved. In the mid-1920s, Walther engineered and obtained patents for an improved truck brake drum. In 1930, Dayton Steel Foundry began commercial production of brake drums based upon Walther's improvements on existing designs.

Dissatisfaction with the cast irons then being used for brake drums prompted Walther and his staff to experiment with other materials better suited for the heavier loads and increased speeds of modern trucks. This research program, under Walther's direct supervision, produced a custom-built material which, for the lack of a better name, the company designated "Brake Drum Iron". This stronger, more wear-resistant and thermal-stable brake drum iron is a molybdenum alloyed iron, and with a few minor changes in analysis, is the iron still standard for most brake drums today. Until World War II Dayton Steel Foundry was the world's largest consumer of molybdenum for cast iron.

== Fifth wheel and landing legs ==
Walther, the businessman, observed that semi-trailer trucks were carrying an increased share of the trucking cargo. Walther started working on the design and engineering of fifth wheels and landing legs for semi-trailer trucks.

=== Fifth wheel – for semi-trailer trucks ===
The third major product designed by Walther and manufactured by the Dayton Steel Foundry was the 5th wheel. Semi-trailer trucks were starting to appear in the marketplace in the 1920s and 1930s. A logical next product, after wheels and brake drums, was the fifth wheel or 5th wheel.

The term 'fifth wheel' comes from a coupling device to attach a truck trailer to the truck cab. Basically a wheel was placed on the rear frame section of the truck, which back then only had four wheels, this wheel that was placed on the frame was the "fifth wheel" hence the name.

In 1932, the company introduced a fifth wheel mounting for trucks. Then in 1941 the Universal Dayton Fifth Wheel was put into production.

Walther was granted several patents for improved designs for the 5th wheel.

=== Landing legs – for semi-trailer trucks ===
The fourth major product designed by Walther and manufactured by the Dayton Steel Foundry is landing gear or landing legs. The landing legs work in combination with the 5th wheel, so that when the trailer is detached from the 5th wheel at the rear of the truck cab, the landing legs would automatically be extended down into a vertical position to support the front end of the trailer. Trailer landing legs, both manual and hydraulic, were developed and added to the company's line of products.

== World War II support ==
During the interval between the two World Wars, Dayton Steel Foundry did high-quality, specification steel castings for exacting federal work for projects such as TVA, and others. Following its World War I example, the company contributed heavily toward war production during the Second World War They made bogie brackets for half-tracks, gun slides for mountain howitzers, wheels for tank retrievers and other special applications, truck wheels, government fifth wheels and landing gears.

== Expansion - plants and products ==
After the end of World War II, there was rapid expansion of the trucking industry in the US and around the world. Trucks need wheels and brakes and semi-trailer trucks need fifth wheels and landing legs. This created a growing market for products manufactured by the Dayton Steel Foundry.

=== Family members join business ===
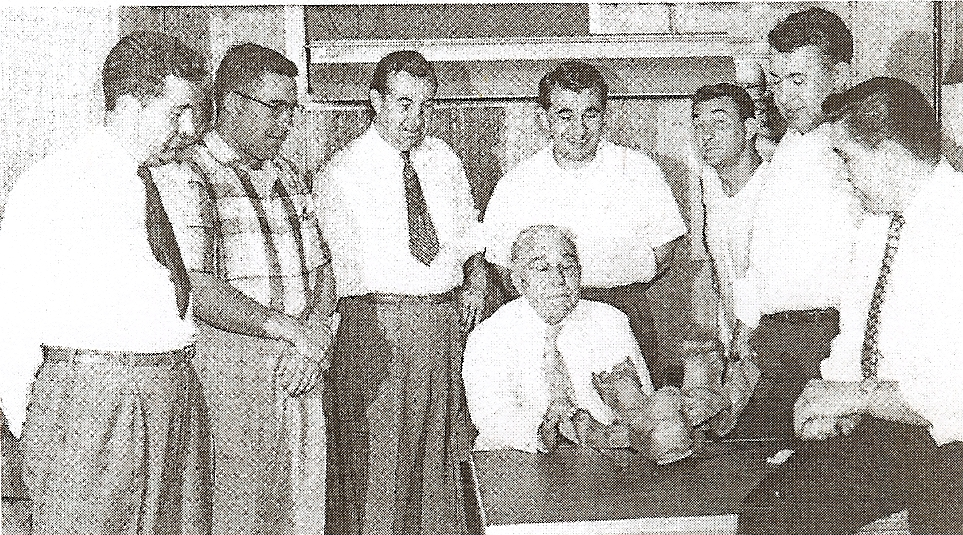
George Walther and his sons (John, Daniel, George Jr, Jacob, David, Jimmy, Dick) inspect a truck wheel to celebrate 50th Anniversary of Dayton Steel Foundry in 1955

All nine of Walther's sons and two of his three daughters worked for the company, in various different capacities. Walther turned the leadership company over to his first son, George Jr. in 1941.

Walther died in 1961, at age 84, but the company continued to grow under the family's leadership. In the 1970s, the Dayton Steel Foundry was one of the largest manufacturers of steel truck wheels in the world, with manufacturing operations at multiple USA sites plus four other countries (Canada, France, England, Mexico) – and licensing agreements with companies in three more countries (Spain, Brazil, Columbia).

== Civic leader ==
Walther was active in civic matters. He was a member of the Board of Directors that was responsible for the building of a new Dayton Y.M.C.A. building. He served a member of the Board of Directors for the Good Samaritan Hospital. Walther was a member of the Board of Directors for the Montgomery County Orphanage. He also served as a member of the Board of Directors for the Miami Valley Hospital. For a number of years Walther served as an Associate Member of the Lay Board of Trustees for the University of Dayton.

Walther was an Associate Member of the Truck and Trailer Manufactures' Association and a charter member of the groups' Old Timer Club. He was also a member of the Newcomen Society, an organization of steam men.

Walther has been elected as a director of various companies. He served as a member of the board of directors for Winters National Bank at the same time that Charles Kettering was chairman of the board of directors for Winters National Bank.

He has been a Mason, a Shriner, an Odd Fellow and a member of the Rotary Club. Walther and 7 of his 9 sons presented a program at a Dayton Rotary meeting in 1948.

== Personal life ==
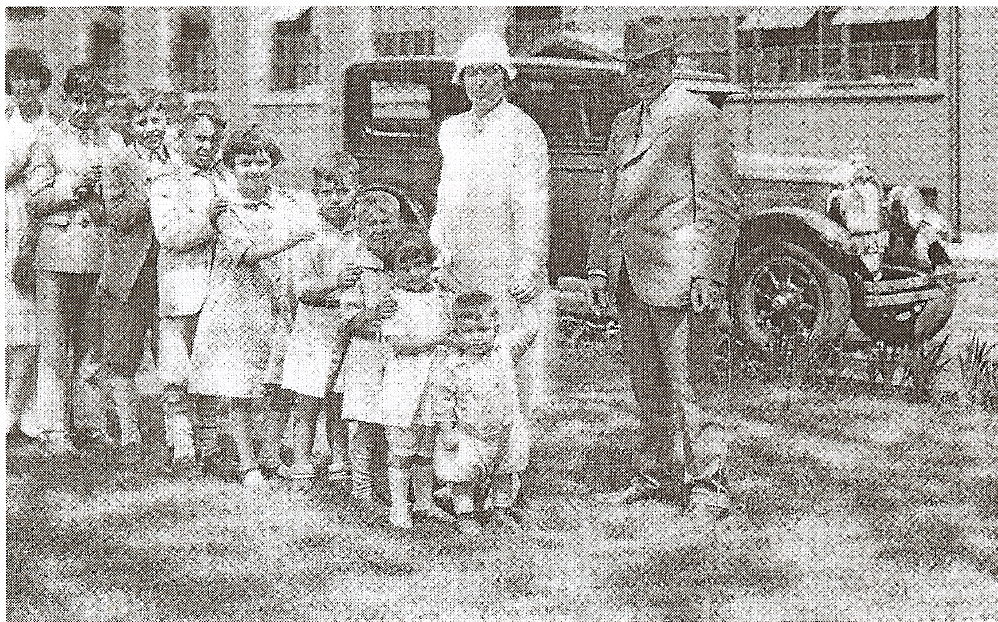
George and Katie Walther "line-up" taken in July, 1926. Notice the cast steel wheels on the car. A portion of the Dayton Steel Foundry can be seen in the background. Children: Elizabeth(Waff), George Jr, John, Jimmy, Gretchen(Jinx), Jacob(Jep), David, Mary Jane(MJ), & Daniel.

On June 30, 1911 Walther and Katie Rebecca Nicholas were married. They had 12 children: Elizabeth, George Jr., John, James, Gretchen, Jacob, David, Mary Jane, Daniel, William, Richard and Fredrick. George Jr. was the father of racing driver Salt Walther, and grandfather of Jay Walther

In 1932, the Walthers decided to move their family from their Nicholas Road home to a new home on David Road on the south side of Dayton. A newspaper article reported: "The residence on the David Church road south of Dayton has been purchased by George Walther, president of the Dayton Steel Foundry, occupies a site of 25 acres. The new house has the largest private swimming pool in this vicinity."

== Memorials and awards ==
=== Walther Park - Kettering, Ohio ===
Walther Park on Overland Trail in Kettering, Ohio is named in memory of George Walther Sr. It is on land once owned by Walther and near the Walther family home referred to as "the Big House" on West David Road.

=== Honorary Doctor of Engineering degree ===
In 1958, Walther received an honor of which he was proud. At its 108th commencement exercises in June 1958, the University of Dayton awarded Walther an honorary Doctor of Engineering degree.

In presenting the degree, Fr. Andrew Seeboldt President of the University, praised Walther for his many and varied contributions to industry, country, and community. The citation said, in part ". . . Walther has willingly accepted civic responsibility . . . given an outstanding example to independent business ownership and free enterprise . . . lent active support to every forward movement in the industry to which he has made such significant contributions."

== Patents ==
Walther is the inventor for over 100 patents where the Assignee is the Dayton Steel Foundry. Walther's patents fall into 4 major truck components: wheels, brakes, fifth wheels and landing gear. Early patents for each component include:

- U.S. patent D45097 Automotive Truck Wheel-for solid rubber tires, Filing date: April 18, 1913
- U.S. patent 1,346,864 Truck Wheel-for solid rubber tires, Filing date: May 19, 1919
- U.S. patent 1,393,928 Truck Wheel-for pneumatic tires, Filing date: February 25, 1920
- U.S. patent 1,473,366 Brake Drum, Filing date: July 31, 1922
- U.S. patent 2,359,499 Tractor-Trailer Coupler Means-aka Fifth Wheel Mounting, Filing date: April 9, 1941
- U.S. patent 2,193,049 Trailer support-aka landing gear or landing legs, Filing date: July 29, 1938

Walther's patents may be viewed in the Google Searchable Patent Content Database by searching on "George Walther" plus "wheel" or "brake drum" or "fifth wheel"

== Sources ==
- Ronald, Bruce W & Virginia. (1981). Dayton: The Gem City. Dayton: Continental Heritage Press.
- Smith, William E & Ophia D. (1964). History of Southwestern Ohio, the Miami Valleys, Volume 3. Little Miami River Valley: Lewis Historical Publishing Company.
- Downs, Winfield Scott. (1969). Encyclopedia of American Biography: New Series, Volume 39. American Historical Company.
- Dayton Steel Foundry Co. (1919), "The Ultimate Motor Truck Wheel", University of California Libraries, Engineering Library, (https://archive.org/stream/ultimatemotortru00daytrich#page/56/mode/2up)
- Foundry, Volume 46, Pg 396-401, The Foundry (September 1918), "Making Cast Steel Wheels for the U.S. Army", Penton Publishing Company, Archive: Google Books eBook, (https://books.google.com/books?id=FJJMAAAAYAAJ&printsec=frontcover&source=gbs_ge_summary_r&cad=0#v=onepage&q=dayton%20steel%20foundry&f=false)
- Geo. Walther Sr. (1954), "History of the Dayton Steel Foundry Company", Dayton Steel Foundry Co.
- Dayton Steel Foundry Newsletter (1955), "The Wheel – 50th Anniversary Edition 1905 – 1955", Dayton Steel Foundry
- Dayton Steel Foundry (1961), "Tribute to George Walther Sr.", Dayton Steel Foundry Co.
- University of Dayton (1958), "A Tribute to - George Walther, Sr. - President The Dayton Steel Foundry Co. - Inventor – Industrialist – Civic Leader - 1958", University of Dayton
- Google Patent website, Contains searchable copies of old U.S. Patents, (https://patents.google.com)
