= George Anthony (footballer) =

Australian rules footballer, born 1904

Personal information
- Full name: George Anthony
- Born: 17 April 1904
- Died: 13 July 1971 (aged 67)
- Original team: Footscray District

Playing career^{1}
Years	Club	Games (Goals)
1926–27	Footscray	15 (4)
- ^{1} Playing statistics correct to the end of 1927.

George Anthony (17 April 1904 – 13 July 1971) was a former Australian rules footballer who played with Footscray in the Victorian Football League (VFL).
