= Robert George =

Robert George, Bob George, or Bobby George may refer to:

- B. George, co-founder and executive director of the ARChive of Contemporary Music in New York City
- Bobby George (born 1945), English darts player
- Bobby George (restaurateur), restaurateur from Cleveland, United States
- Robert George (Canadian admiral) (born 1940), officer of the Canadian Forces
- Robert George (ice hockey) (1896–1979), French ice hockey player
- Robert George (pharmacologist) (1923–2006), American pharmacologist
- Sir Robert George (RAF officer) (1896–1967), air force pilot and governor of South Australia
- Robert George (rower) (1932–2006), Belgian rower
- Robert A. George, writer for the New York Post
- Robert P. George (born 1955), Princeton University professor
- Robert Bobby George, Indian athletics coach
