= Doris Mae Oulton =

Doris Mae Oulton OM (born May 23, 1945 in Edmonton, Alberta, Canada) is a Canadian advocate for women’s rights.

One of three daughters, Oulton left home early after high school. Oulton utilized media tools across the Canadian North, helping people build broadcast skills in dozens of communities. She also established the Manitoba Women's Directorate to fight sexism in the region and was in charge of the Directorate with the status of Assistant Deputy Minister, reporting directly to the Manitoba Minister for the Status of Women. Her work with the Directorate covered rural as well as urban settings.

In 2001, YMCA/YWCA of Winnipeg selected Oulton for its Women of Distinction Awards.

Oulton helped to create the Nellie McClung Foundation and became the Chair of the Foundation's Board in 2006. Oulton was made a Member of the Order of Manitoba in 2021.
