= David George =

David George may refer to:

- David George (Baptist) (1740/42–1810), African-American Baptist preacher, and a founding father of Sierra Leone
- David George (cyclist) (born 1976), South African cyclist
- David George (Manitoba politician) (1854–1925)
- David R. George III, American science fiction writer
- David George (surgeon) (1943–2023), British surgeon
- A pseudonym of Leo Dorfman (1914–1974)

== See also ==
- David Lloyd George (1863–1945), surname Lloyd George, British politician, Prime Minister of the United Kingdom
- David Gorge (1501–1556), aka Jan Jorisz, Protestant reformer
- George David (disambiguation)
