= Sally Horsfall Eaton Centre =

Academic building in Toronto, Ontario, Canada

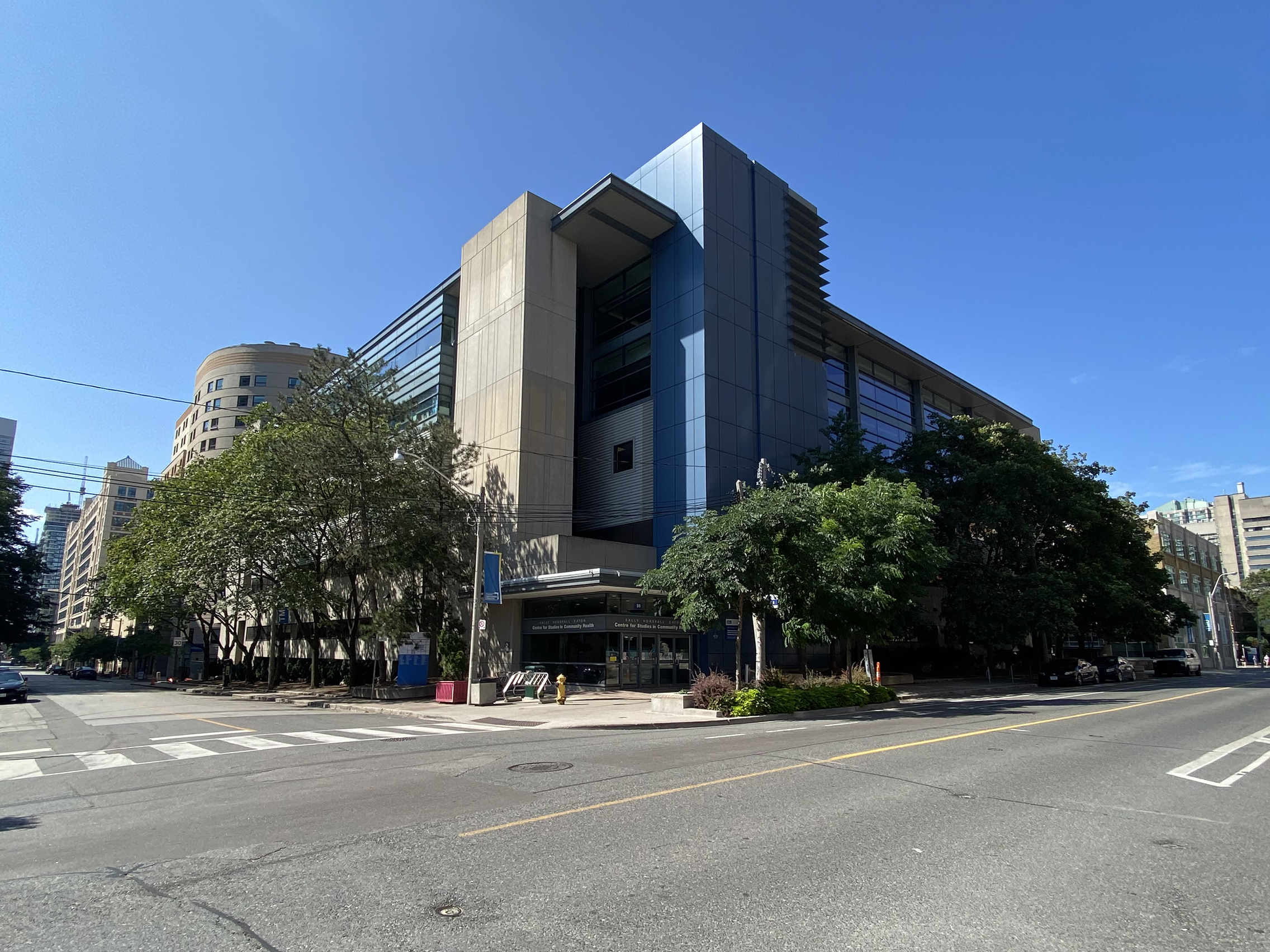
Sally Horsfall Eaton Centre in 2023

Sally Horsfall Eaton Centre is an academic building in Toronto, Ontario, Canada. It is home to Toronto Metropolitan University's Studies for Community Health. The building is named after Sally Horsfall Eaton, the third wife of businessman John Craig Eaton II.

Located at 99 Gerrard Street East, it is a four-storey structure built on top of the existing Eric Palin Hall. It was completed in 2002 by Rounthwaite, Dick & Hadley, with Lett Smith Architects.

The building houses:

- Child and Youth Care
- Disability Studies
- Early Childhood Education
- Engineering & Sciences
- Health Services Management
- Midwifery
- Nurse Practitioner
- Nursing
- Social Work
- Activation Coordinator/Gerontology
