= Morris Moscovitch =

Morris Moscovitch CM is Max and Gianna Glassman Chair in Neuropsychology and Aging and professor of psychology at the University of Toronto Faculty of Arts and Science. He is also a Senior Scientist at the Rotman Research Institute of Baycrest Centre for Geriatric Care in Toronto, Ontario, Canada. Moscovitch is a leading neuropsychologist, with over 150 research articles focusing mainly on the neural substrates of high-level cognitive processes such as memory, attention, and recognition of faces and objects. According to Google Scholar, he has an h-index of 121 and over 52000 citations (2020).

The focus of Moscovitch's research is on the way the brain stores and retrieves memories. He has formulated a neuropsychological model of memory with three components: the posterior neocortex, which mediates performance on tests of memory without awareness; the medial temporal lobes, which automatically store information that is consciously apprehended at encoding and obligatorily recovers information on tests of conscious recollection that are cue-driven; and the frontal lobes, which work with memories delivered to and by the medial temporal lobes and posteri or neocortex, and recovered from them by supporting strategic processes that are needed at encoding and retrieval.

Moscovitch received a B.A. in psychology from McGill University in 1966, and an M.A. and Ph.D. in psychology from the University of Pennsylvania in 1967 and 1972, respectively. He was born in Bucharest, Romania, where he lived for the first few years of his life before moving to Israel at the age of 4 and subsequently moving to Montreal, Quebec, Canada at the age of 7. Moscovitch became interested in memory research while attending McGill for his undergraduate degree, where Brenda Milner's case study of HM inspired him to seek a life in neuropsychology. He also took a seminar taught by Donald O. Hebb, then the leading biological psychology theorist. In December, 2020 he was appointed a Member of the Order of Canada for his contributions to clinical neuropsychology and cognitive neuroscience, particularly his ground-breaking memory research..
