= Peter George =

Peter George may refer to:

- Peter George (author) (1924–1966), British writer
- Peter George (businessman) (1943–2007), British businessman, chief executive of Ladbroke Group (later Hilton Group)
- Peter George (cricketer) (born 1986), Australian cricketer
- Peter George (professor) (1941–2017), Canadian economist
- Peter George (politician) (born 1951), Australian politician
- Pete George (1929–2021), American weightlifter
