= George Waters (businessman) =

American pioneer in the credit card industry

- Born: George Wilbur Waters; January 9, 1916; Madison, Indiana
- Died: January 11, 2003 (aged 87); Fair Haven, New Jersey
- Education: Indiana University
- Occupation: Businessman
- Known for: Father of the American Express Card

George Wilbur Waters (January 9, 1916 – January 11, 2003) was an American pioneer in the credit card industry who is credited with transforming the American Express Card into a global brand and the flagship product of the American Express Company. Upon his retirement from American Express in 1980, Waters was bestowed with the title, "Father of the American Express Card".

== Early career ==
George Waters graduated from Indiana University in 1938 and was hired by IBM in its sales and marketing program. During World War II, he joined the US Army Air Forces where he served as Deputy Chief of Staff in the Office of Statistical Control. During the war, Waters led a team that used some of the earliest computers to keep track of planes, the weather and results of combat missions. Many noted postwar executives came out of the Office of Statistical Control, including Robert S. McNamara and others who became known as the Whiz Kids.

After the war, Waters served as the President of the Massachusetts Steamship Authority, a ferry service between Cape Cod, Martha's Vineyard and Nantucket. Waters eventually sold the business to the Commonwealth of Massachusetts. He went on to become an Executive Vice President in charge of marketing at Colonial Stores, an Atlanta-based supermarket chain.

== American Express ==
American Express entered the credit card industry in 1958 with its own product, a purple charge card for travel and entertainment expenses. By the time Waters was hired in 1961, The American Express Card was number two in the industry behind Diners Club, still unprofitable, and management was unsure about what to do with the business. They considered merging with Diners Club and also forming a joint venture with Hilton Hotels. The card at that time was primarily accepted in restaurants, as hotels, car rental companies and airlines were either reluctant to accept credit cards or issued their own cards.

Soon after his arrival in 1961, Waters recognized several problems. The division had grown so fast that internal controls for monitoring card activity and service establishment payments were weak. Too many card members were not paying their bills on time, and the company was not charging enough relative to the services that it was providing to card members and service establishments. Waters' plan for reviving the business was based on positioning the card as a product that was not for everyone. He teamed up with mathematicians at MIT to develop algorithms to track card spending activity that avoided the need for credit limits and allowed card members to establish their own responsible spending patterns. Drawing on his Air Force computer experience, he installed a data processing system that kept track of card activity and improved accounting controls. Next, he terminated card members who were not paying their bills on time – approximately one third of the card base. He then raised the annual card fee to $8.00 from $6.00 and raised the discount rate - the percentage of the sale that the service establishments had to pay American Express – from 3% to 7%. To make the discount rate more palatable to merchants, Waters drew upon his supermarket marketing experience by partnering with merchants in a cooperating advertising program. Waters proposed to give back .5% of all charge card volume to merchants to fund cooperative ads that helped service establishments advertise their products, accompanied by the little blue box Amex logo at the bottom of the advertisement.

The strategy soon worked. On the strength of its advertising and growing list of participating businesses, The American Express Card became profitable by 1962 and in 1964, American Express saw its volume of charged sales surpass Diners Club.

There was still more work to be done. The card was still not widely accepted by airlines and hotels. But Waters soon convinced American Airlines to drop its card and accept the American Express Card. Soon afterwards, all other major airlines followed. Next, Waters negotiated an exclusive arrangement with the American Hotel Association and soon thereafter, the card became broadly accepted at hotels in Europe and throughout the world.

Throughout the 1960s and 1970s, Waters went on to build the brand and expand the franchise globally. He and American Express CEO James D. Robinson commissioned Andrew Kershaw at Ogilvy and Mather to come up with an advertising tag line for the business. Ogilvy came back with the slogans "Do You Know Me" and "Don't leave home without it".

By the time Waters stepped down as Executive Vice President and President of Travel Related Services in 1978, the American Express Card had become accepted at travel establishments internationally. The card had 9.5 million members, generated close to $1 billion in revenue, and accounted for the largest share of the company’s net income. As of 2026, the American Express Card remains the leading profit center for the company.
