= George S Paul =

Indian writer and journalist (born 1947)

- Born: George S Paul; 25 January 1947 (age 79); Thiruvalla, Pathanamthitta Kerala India
- Occupations: Music critic, author, cultural critic
- Years active: 1990–present
- Spouse: Omana George

George S Paul, also known as G. S. Paul (born 25 January 1947) is an Indian writer, essayist and music journalist. He was born to Rev. K. C. Samuel and Thankamma Samuel in Thiruvalla, Pathanamthitta district of Kerala.

== Early life and education ==
After graduating in physics, Paul took a postgraduate diploma in journalism. He was professor and head of the physics department at Christ College, Irinjalakuda.

== Career ==
Paul was a member of the senate in the University of Calicut from 1994 till 1998. He has contributed to the Hindu, Economic Times and Indian Express as an art and culture critic. He has written on music and classical performing art forms like Kathakali, Koodiyattam and Mohiniyattam since the 1980s. He has also authored Swarangalude Sasthram, Vasundhara and Odyssey of a Dancer. He has been invited to present papers in various national seminars. He sat on the jury committee of Swathi puraskaram, Nrithya Natyapuraskaram, pallavur Appumarar puraskaram. He was an executive committee member of Kerala Sangeetha Nataka Akademi during the tenure of actor Murali as chairman. He was also an executive committee member of Kerala Kalamandalam.
