= George Watters (soldier) =

George Watters (26 September 1904 – 1980) known as Geordie, was a Scottish miner and labourer from Prestonpans, East Lothian. He fought in the Spanish Civil War and Second World War, and was a socialist activist.

== Life and politics ==
Watters grew up in a mining community around Prestongrange colliery, when he was 14 years old, his brother was killed in an underground accident, and he became a social activist three years later. He distributed the weekly paper of the British Communist Party in the local area, and joined the party with his two other brothers in the early 1920s.

He was barred from working in the local pit as he was seen as an agitator and trouble maker following the 1926 General Strike and ensuing lock-out.

Watters opposed the British Union of Fascists and held left-wing socialist views. He attended a rally of the group held at Usher Hall in Edinburgh in 1936, despite a petition by 15,000 residents to ban the event. Watters was seen interrupting the meeting with Donald Renton by singing The Internationale which started a fight and he was arrested and fined.

Watters was aware of the dispute leading to the Asturian miners strike where workers were attacked by the Spanish Foreign Legion and Moroccan Regulares, as the right-wing government sought to crush the uprising.

== Volunteer in the International Brigade ==
He served in the International Brigade during the Spanish Civil War, departing for Spain in November 1936, with his wife Ellen's support, although leaving her and three children. After basic training, he was one of the volunteers captured by nationalist troops at the battle of Jarama on 13 February 1937. During that first major encounter between the brigades and a much larger number of experienced Franco's troops

after only two days, No. 2 Machine Gun Company had lost well over 50 per cent of their men, killed, wounded or missing, and their battalion had gone from 600 men to approximately 200. In comparison, percentage-wise, the British army lost 12.5 per cent of their men during the six years of the Second World War

Captured, Watters was sentenced to indefinite solitary confinement. When complaints were raised about a condemned prisoner's treatment, the guards told them to take the condemned prisoner's place if they objected. Watters volunteered and was scheduled to be executed three days later, but was spared. His brother-in-law William Dickson was killed at the Battle of Brunete. Watters's family believed he was dead until footage of his repatriation was shown on a news reel. The parade of International Brigades leaving Barcelona was supported by a large crowd, and shouts of 'No Pasaran' and singer Dolores Ibárruri, known as La Pasionaria, said to the volunteers

“We shall not forget you; and, when the olive tree of peace is in flower, entwined with the victory laurels of the Republic of Spain – return! "Return to our side for here you will find a homeland – those who have no country or friends, who must live deprived of friendship – all, all will have the affection and gratitude of the Spanish people who today and tomorrow will shout with enthusiasm – Long live the heroes of the International Brigades!”

Back home, Watters had difficulty finding employment, even in the mines, as did some others who had been communists.

== Second World War and later life ==
George Watters also went on to fight in the Second World War by which time he had five children, and although 'he rarely spoke to his family about his war service', it included 'Madagascar, India, Persia (now Iran), Iraq, Sicily, Gallipoli, North Africa and Egypt'.

Later he was elected chairman of the National Union of Mineworkers for twenty years at Prestonlinks Colliery, then when it closed moved to Monktonhall pit.

He and his wife Ellen had eight children by 1953. He continued to protest for social justice, for example being arrested at the Polaris nuclear submarine protests in the 1960s. In 1977, he and his wife visited Leningrad for the 60th anniversary of the Russian Revolution.

He died (with dementia) in 1980.

== Legacy ==
In 2019, Watters was the subject of 549: Scots of the Spanish Civil War, a play about his role in the Spanish Civil War. A stained glass window with a dedication to Watters was installed in the Prestonpans Labour Club in June 2021. In 2023, a book was published, with the families of Scottish International Brigade volunteers, including a description of Geordie Watters' experiences, titled Our Fathers Fought Franco, with royalties to the International Brigades Memorial Trust.
