= Paul George (disambiguation) =

Paul George (born 1990) is an American basketball player.

Paul George may also refer to:

- Paul George (environmentalist), Canadian author and politician
- Paul George (footballer) (born 1994), Northern Irish footballer
- Pinkie George (Paul George, 1905–1993), American professional wrestling promoter, boxer and businessman
- Paul George (horticulturalist) (1841–1921), recipient of Victoria Medal of Honour

== See also ==
- George Paul (disambiguation)
- Nikhil Paul George, Indian artist
- Paul St George, British artist
- Paul Georges (1923–2002), American artist
