= Louis George (disambiguation) =

Louis George was a master Prussian watchmaker.

Louis George may also refer to:

- Louis George (politician) (1950–2014), Saint Lucian politician
- Louis George, Margrave of Baden-Baden (1702–1761), German noble
