= George Vivian Paul =

Indian stand-up comedian and writer

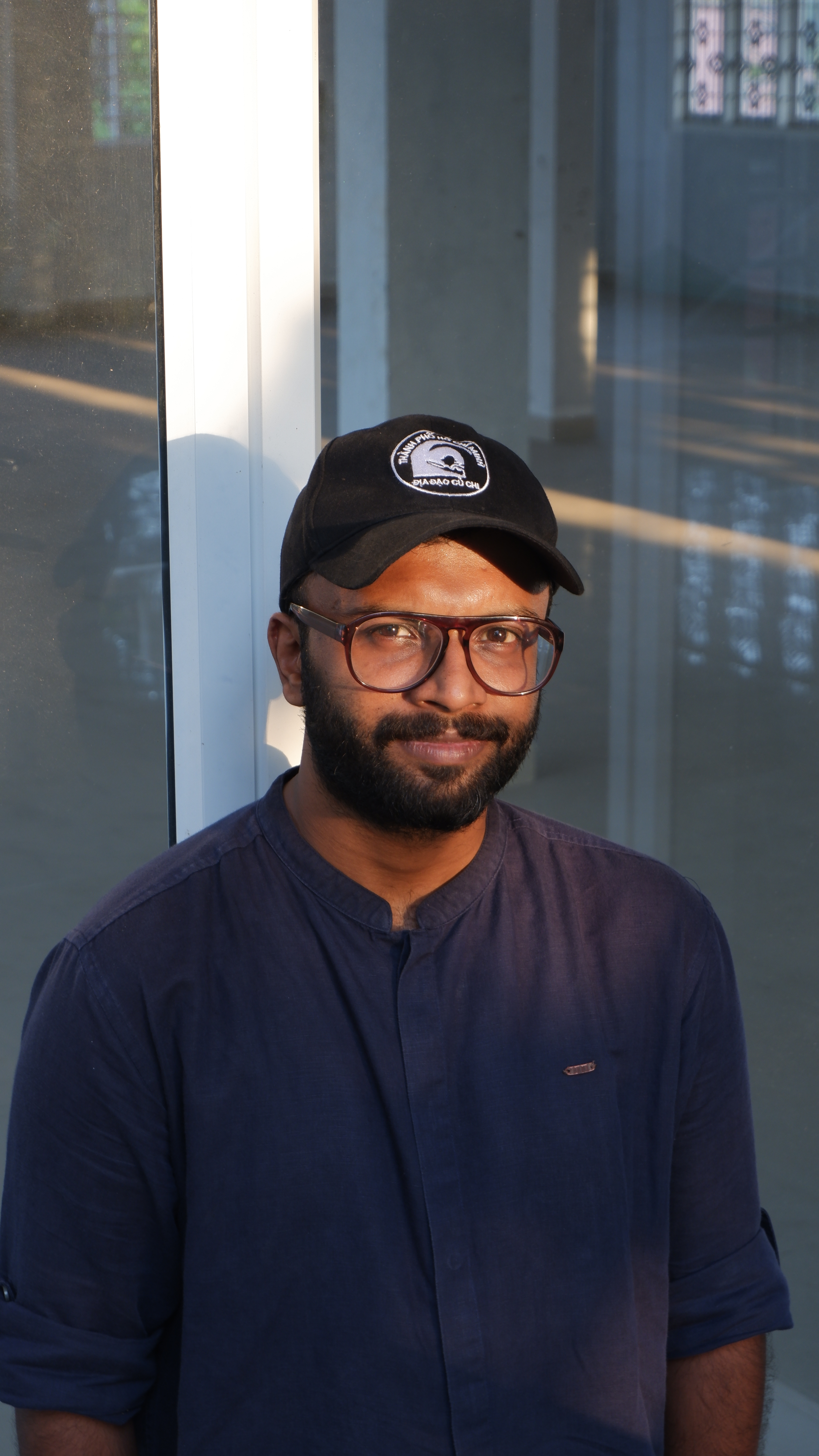
- George Vivian Paul in 2020
- Education: Mar Athanasius College of Engineering
- Known for: Podcast, Stand-up Comedy
- Notable work: Vivian's Irrelevant Podcast

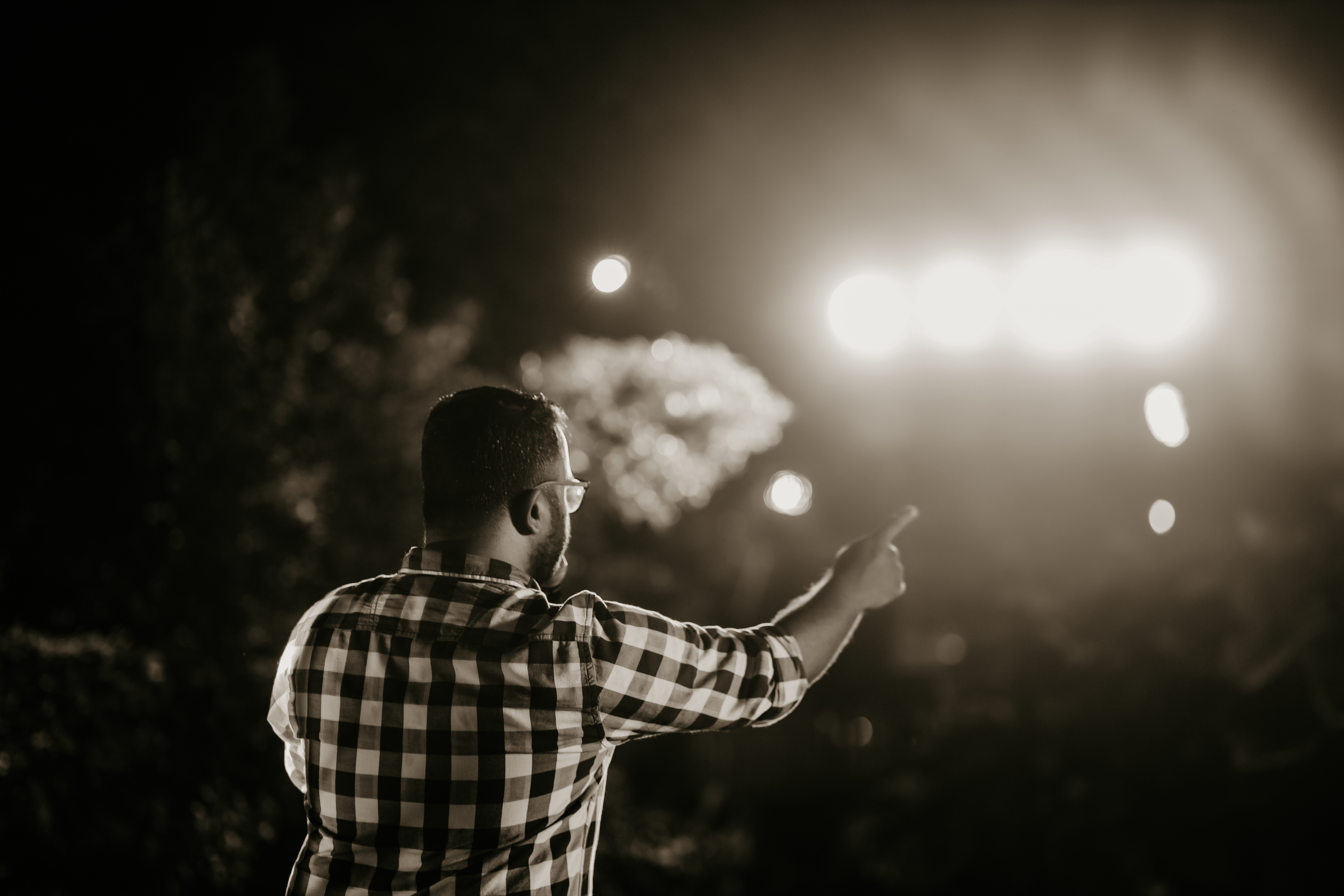
Vivian performing in an event in Kerala

George Vivian Paul is an Indian standup comedian, writer, actor and podcaster and co-founder of Kochin Komedians from the state of Kerala. He also organises standup comedy shows on busy streets, thus making him the nation's first street comic to be recognised.

He began his journey as part of Kalkutta Komedians and Comedified. and continued to start Kochin Komedians in 2016 in Kochi. He currently best known for his podcast 'Vivian's Irrelevant Podcast'.

== Education ==
Vivian finished his Bachelor of Technology at Mar Athanasius College of Engineering and has worked in cities like Chennai and Bangalore before being introduced to the stand-up comedy scene in Kolkata.

== Early life and career ==
George Vivian Paul has worked in construction companies in various cities across the country as a civil engineer for a period of a little over two years, before shifting his career to be a stand-up comedian in Kolkata. He joined the stand-up comedy group 'Kalkutta Komedians' and started performing at open-mics across the city. Owing to his father's career in the Indian Army, Vivian had to move around to various parts of the country which allowed him to pick up many languages. With mostly performing his sets in English, he would deliver punchlines in the local dialects to make the joke more impactful.

In 2016, on realizing the potential for stand-up comedy in Kochi, Vivian co-founded 'Kochin Komedians', a part of the 'Komedian's Network'. Through the group, he would organize open-mics across the city. During the COVID- 19 pandemic, he started his podcast 'Vivian's Irrelevant Podcast' in partnership with the indie music streaming service SocialMob.

He made his acting debut in the award winning film Avasavyuham, which went on the win the best film in the 52nd Kerala State Film Awards.
