= Frank Honywill George =

Frank Honywill George (2 May 1921 – 10 September 1997) was a British psychologist, cyberneticist and former Professor of Cybernetics and Director of the Institute of Cybernetics at the Brunel University, best known for his 1962 book The Brain as a Computer.

== Biography ==
Born in Bristol, England, George received his MA at the University of Cambridge and his PhD in psychology at the University of Bristol.

In 1949, he started his academic career at the University of Bristol, Department of Psychology as a lecturer in psychology. In 1968 he was elected first Chairman of the Institution of Computer Sciences of the University of Bristol. In that time he was also working as a computer consultant for the NATO, and became a fellow of the British Computer Society (FBCS) From the early 1970s until the early 1980s George was Professor of Cybernetics and Director of the Institute of Cybernetics at the Brunel University. From late 1970s to the early 1990s George was director of the UK Bureau of Information Science.

George's research interests concerned cybernetics and related fields. In the 1980s his research ranged from "artificial intelligence; industrial and management cybernetics with emphasis on modelling and heuristic programming approaches to research in organizational behaviour". During his academic career he authored over 20 books ranging from psychology, cybernetics, digital computing and robotics, to philosophy of science.

George died on 10 September 1997 in High Wycombe, Buckinghamshire, England.

== Publications ==
Books, a selection:

- 1959. Automation, Cybernetics and Society . Philosophical Library.
- 1962. The Brain As A Computer Pergamon Press.
- 1964. Psychology for Everyman. With Larry Seymour Skurnik. Penguin Books
- 1966. An introduction to digital computing
- 1971. Cybernetics, Teach Yourself Books
- 1974. The robots are coming With John D. Humphries.
- 1970. Science and the crisis in society
- 1976. The foundations of cybernetics
- 1977. Cybernetics and the Environment. Elek.
- 1977. Precision, language and logic, Pergamon Press.
- 1977 Science Fact, (editor) Great Missenden: Topaz Records
- 1981. The science of philosophy
- 1985. Purposive Behavior and Teleological Functions. With Les Johnson. Gordon & Breach Publishing Group.
- 1986. Artificial intelligence: its philosophy and neural context

Documentary

- Citizen 63, 1963 (30 min.) produced by John Boorman for BBC West (Bristol)
