= Harry L. George =

Harry L. George (1849-1923) was a twentieth century American collector of Native American artifacts.

== Collector ==
He amassed a large collection of Native American artifacts from St. Joseph, Missouri between 1904 and 1923. This notable collection includes over 4,000 objects, hundreds of photographs, books and two large ledgers filled with correspondence surrounding the collection. The collection is owned by St. Joseph Museums, Inc.

In 1904, Harry George purchased his first basket on a trip west and by 1914 the Kansas City Star wrote he had "assembled one of the finest collections [of Native American artifacts] in existence".

George corresponded with George Gustav Heye, Francis La Fleshe, Grace Nicholson, Luther Standing Bear, and many other notable collectors and dealers in Native American artifacts in the early 1900s. His correspondence includes letters from reservation agents and lesser known collectors yet to be significantly researched.

== Personal life ==
George was born in Philadelphia, Pennsylvania, in November, 1849. He moved to St. Joseph, Missouri, in September, 1869, and entered the employ of R. L. McDonald & Co., with whom he continued for twenty-seven years. On January 23, 1884, he married his employer's daughter Maggie Beattie McDonald. They had two daughters.

The St. Joseph businessman and textile broker died in 1923, leaving his collection to his heirs. His hope was to create a museum for St. Joseph and he had worked towards raising $25,000 for that purpose. In 1924, the collection was loaned to the State Museum in Jefferson City, Mo. It returned to St. Joseph in 1944 on loan and was purchased by the St. Joseph Museum in 1947.
