= Thomas E. George =

American politician

Thomas E. George is a former American politician.

George attended O'Fallon Technical High School in O'Fallon, Missouri, and Washington University in St. Louis. Outside of politics, George worked as an electrician affiliated with the International Brotherhood of Electrical Workers from 1965 to his retirement in 2017. He was president of IBEW Local 1 from 1998 until his retirement.

He served in the Missouri House of Representatives from 1999 to 2006, as a Democratic legislator from house district 74.
