= Gorgeous George (disambiguation) =

Gorgeous George, real name George Wagner (1915–1963), was an American professional wrestler.

Gorgeous George may also refer to:

== People with the nickname ==
=== Professional wrestling ===
- "Gorgeous" George Grant (1925–2010), American professional wrestler
- Stephanie Bellars (born 1976), American professional wrestling valet billed as Gorgeous George in WCW
- Gorgeous George III, real name Robert Kellum (born 1973), American professional wrestler, also known as "The Maestro".
- "Gorgeous" George Gillette (1940–1989) manager of English masked professional wrestler Kendo Nagasaki

=== Others ===
- George Galloway (born 1954), Scottish politician
- George Sisler (1893–1973), Hall of Fame baseball player
- George Smathers (1913–2007), American lawyer and politician nicknamed "Gorgeous George"
- Georg Gänswein (born 1956), Prefect of the Papal household of the Holy See

== Other uses ==
- Gorgeous George (album), 1994 album by Edwyn Collins
- Gorgeous George (comics), a Marvel Comics character
- Gorgeous George, a series of children's novels by Stuart Reid
- Gorgeous George, a character in the Guy Ritchie movie Snatch
