= W. L. George =

English writer (1882–1926)

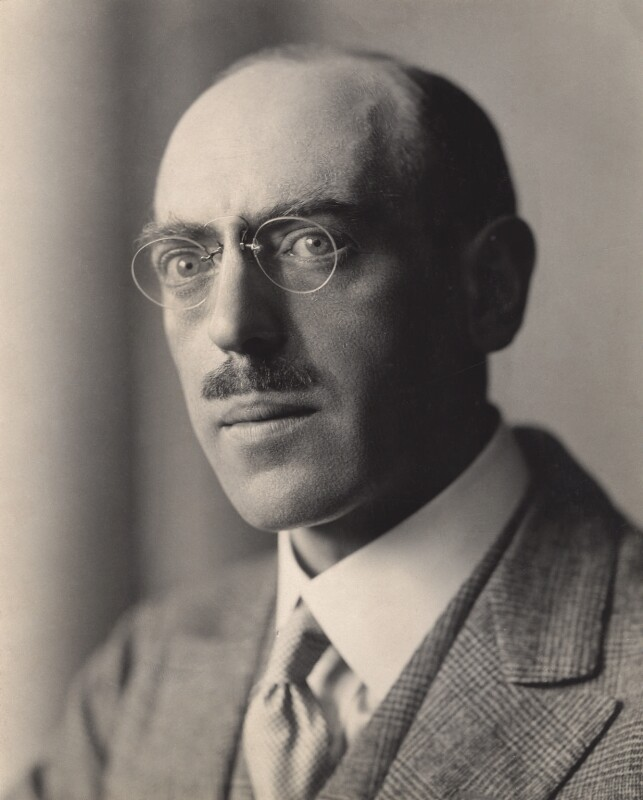
- Born: 20 March 1882
- Died: 30 January 1926
- Occupation: Writer

Walter Lionel George (20 March 1882, Paris, France – 30 January 1926) was an English writer, chiefly known for his popular fiction, which included feminist, pacifist, and pro-labour themes.

== Life ==
Although born of British parents, George grew up in Paris and did not learn English until the age of twenty. His paternal grandfather was Jewish. In 1905 he moved to London, where he became a journalist. The success of his first novel, A Bed of Roses (1911), about a woman's descent into prostitution, allowed him to apply himself full-time to literary efforts. His subsequent books also generally sold well, often requiring more than one edition and appearing on both sides of the Atlantic. In addition to novels and short stories, George also wrote literary essays and several political tracts on left-wing themes. He was married three times and widowed twice.

== Reception and influence ==
In 1945 George Orwell included George in a list of "natural" novelists, not inhibited by "good taste", and particularly praised Caliban (a fictionalised account of the life of Lord Northcliffe) for its "memorable and truthful" picture of London life.

According to Alec Waugh, he was commercially successful, helpful in practical terms to upcoming authors, but unpopular in the literary world for his subject matter, his hack journalism, and his left-wing views.

Noting similarities between George's novel Children of the Morning (1926) and William Golding's celebrated Lord of the Flies (1954), Auberon Waugh suggested that George's work may have subliminally influenced Golding, although the latter denied having read it.

In May 1922, George published in the New York Herald an essay entitled What the World Will Be Like in a Hundred Years, envisioning what the world would look like in 2022. Washington Post columnist John Kelly opined in 2022 that, although George had been unduly optimistic and got some details wrong, he "had gotten nearly all of it right", noting George's predictions of an eight-hour flight time between New York and London, decreased reliance on fossil fuels, the availability of legal birth control, motion pictures with sound and colour, the displacement of freight railroads by an emerging trucking industry, and wireless telephones.

== Cultural references ==
Saki, in his short story "The Stalled Ox" (1913), slyly conveys the tastes of the character Adela Pingsford by placing a copy of George's novel Israel Kalisch (1913) in her morning room (where its cover is eaten by an intrusive Ayrshire ox).

== Works ==
- Engines of Social Progress (1907), tract
- France in the Twentieth Century (1908), tract
- Labour and Housing at Port Sunlight (1909), tract
- A Bed of Roses (1911), novel
- City of Light: A Novel of Modern Paris (1912), novel
- Woman and To-morrow (1913), tract
- Israel Kalisch (1913), novel, published in the United States as Until the Day Break
- The Making of an Englishman (1914), novel, reissued as The Little Beloved (1916)
- The Second Blooming (1914), novel
- Dramatic Actualities (1914), essays
- Olga Nazimov and Other Stories (1915), short stories
- Anatole France (1915), criticism
- The Intelligence of Woman (1916), tract
- The Strangers' Wedding, Or the Comedy of a Romantic (1916), novel
- A Novelist on Novels (1918), criticism, published in the United States as Literary Chapters
- Blind Alley (1919), novel
- Eddies of the Day (1919), tract
- Caliban (1920), novel
- The Confession of Ursula Trent (1921), novel, published in the United States as Ursula Trent
- A London Mosaic (1921) with illustrations Philippe Forbes-Robertson.
- Hail Columbia! Random Impressions of A Conservative English Radical (1921), travel writing
- The Stiff Lip (1922), novel, published in the United States as Her Unwelcome Husband (1922), reissued as One of the Guilty (1923)
- The Triumph of Gallio (1924), novel
- The Story of Woman (1925), tract
- Historic Lovers (1925, reissued 1994), popular history
- Children of the Morning (1926), novel
- Gifts of Sheba (1926), novel
- The Ordeal of Monica Mary (1927), novel
- The Selected Short Stories of W. L. George (1927), short stories

In 1909 George along with a French collaborator Raymond Lauzerte published a book on George Bernard Shaw which was reviewed in La Mercure de France [date unknown]. The Pall Mall Gazette of 19 July 1909 printed a letter from George correcting various mistakes but the actual title of the book was not mentioned in the article. Previously George and Lauzerte had published an article on Shaw in Paris, "Les Idees et le theatre de G. Bernard Shaw." Pages libres 363 (14 December 1907): 601-17.
