= George Walters (footballer) =

Scottish footballer

Personal information
- Full name: George Archibald Walters
- Date of birth: 30 March 1939
- Place of birth: Glasgow, Scotland
- Date of death: December 2015 (aged 76)
- Place of death: Devon, England
- Position: Left winger

Senior career*
Years	Team	Apps	(Gls)
1957–1959	Clyde	61	(1)
1959–1960	Oldham Athletic	13	(2)
Total		74	(3)
- * Club domestic league appearances and goals

George Archibald Walters (30 March 1939 – December 2015) was a Scottish footballer, who played as a left winger in the English Football League.
