= Grover C. George =

American politician

Grover C. George (March 17, 1893 – November 4, 1976) was an American farmer and politician.

George was born in Belvidere Township, Goodhue County, Minnesota and went to the Goodhue County public schools. He went to the University of Minnesota, School of Agriculture. George lived with his wife and family in Goodhue, Minnesota and he was a farmer. He served on the Goodhue County War Board and also served as a township clerk. George also served on the local school board and was the school board clerk. He served in the Minnesota Senate and was involved with the Democratic Party. George died at St. Mary's Hospital in Rochester, Minnesota and his funeral and burial was in Red Wing, Minnesota.
