= Susan R. George =

Canadian pharmacologist and neuroendocrinologist

Academic background
- Education: MD, 1975, University of Toronto Faculty of Medicine

Academic work
- Institutions: Leslie Dan Faculty of Pharmacy; Toronto General Hospital

Susan Renu George Bahl FRSC FCAHS CM is a Canadian molecular pharmacologist and neuroendocrinologist. She was named a Member of the Order of Canada in 2020 in recognition of her "pioneering contributions to the fields of molecular pharmacology and neuroendocrinology."

== Early life and education ==
George earned her medical degree at the University of Toronto Faculty of Medicine (U of T) in 1974. She remained at U of T for her residency in internal medicine followed by subspecialty training in endocrinology and metabolism. While completing her endocrinology fellowship, George was among the first scientists to report on the successful effects of bromocriptine on pituitary tumors and impaired vision.

== Career ==
Upon completing her medical training, George worked with Philip Seeman in a research laboratory focused on studying dopamine receptors. During her early years at the University of Toronto, she received the 1988 Discovery Award from the Banting Research Foundation and the 2002 Eaton Scholar Researcher of the Year Award.

In 2019, George and Brian O’Dowd received the Prix Galien Award, the highest award in the field of pharmaceutical research, for developing a novel drug discovery method that directs receptor proteins to the cell nucleus. Their work opens up further potential for the development of drugs targeting various unmet medical needs and improving existing treatments. She was named a Member of the Order of Canada in 2020 in recognition of her "pioneering contributions to the fields of molecular pharmacology and neuroendocrinology."

In 2024, George was elected a Fellow of the Royal Society of Canada for her "significant contributions to our understanding of neurotransmiter G-protein coupled receptors and their role in addiction, depression and neuropsychiatric disorders." She was similarly recognized as a Fellow of the Canadian Academy of Health Sciences the same year.

== Selected publications ==
- G Protein-Coupled Receptor--Protein Interactions (Edited by Susan R. George)
