= Nazarovo =

Nazarovo (Russian: Назарово) is the name of several inhabited localities in Russia.

== Modern localities ==
=== Republic of Bashkortostan ===
As of 2014, two rural localities in the Republic of Bashkortostan bear this name:

Republic of Bashkortostan distribution map
Distribution of the inhabited localities called Nazarovo in the Republic of Bashkortostan.
- Nazarovo, Baymaksky District, Republic of Bashkortostan, a village in Mukasovsky Selsoviet of Baymaksky District; 52°50′N 58°25′E
- Nazarovo, Zianchurinsky District, Republic of Bashkortostan, a village in Novochebenkinsky Selsoviet of Zianchurinsky District; 52°16′N 56°26′E

=== Chelyabinsk Oblast ===
As of 2014, one rural locality in Chelyabinsk Oblast bears this name:

Chelyabinsk Oblast location map
Location of Nazarovo in Chelyabinsk Oblast
- Nazarovo, Chelyabinsk Oblast, a village in Selezyansky Selsoviet of Yetkulsky District; 54°49′N 61°46′E

=== Ivanovo Oblast ===
As of 2014, one rural locality in Ivanovo Oblast bears this name:

Ivanovo Oblast location map
Location of Nazarovo in Ivanovo Oblast
- Nazarovo, Ivanovo Oblast, a village in Zavolzhsky District; 57°25′N 41°50′E

=== Khanty-Mansi Autonomous Okrug ===
As of 2014, one rural locality in Khanty-Mansi Autonomous Okrug bears this name:

- Nazarovo, Khanty-Mansi Autonomous Okrug, a settlement in Kondinsky District

=== Kostroma Oblast ===
As of 2014, one rural locality in Kostroma Oblast bears this name:

Kostroma Oblast location map
Location of Nazarovo in Kostroma Oblast
- Nazarovo, Kostroma Oblast, a village in Petrovskoye Settlement of Chukhlomsky District; 58°46′N 42°57′E

=== Krasnoyarsk Krai ===
As of 2014, one urban locality in Krasnoyarsk Krai bears this name:

- Nazarovo, Krasnoyarsk Krai, a town; administratively incorporated as a krai town

=== Kurgan Oblast ===
As of 2014, one rural locality in Kurgan Oblast bears this name:

Kurgan Oblast location map
Location of Nazarovo in Kurgan Oblast
- Nazarovo, Kurgan Oblast, a village in Rizhsky Selsoviet of Shumikhinsky District; 55°43′N 63°10′E

=== Moscow Oblast ===
As of 2014, six rural localities in Moscow Oblast bear this name:

Moscow Oblast distribution map
Distribution of the inhabited localities called Nazarovo in Moscow Oblast.
- Nazarovo, Bolsherogachevskoye Rural Settlement, Dmitrovsky District, Moscow Oblast, a village in Bolsherogachevskoye Rural Settlement of Dmitrovsky District; 56°24′N 37°10′E
- Nazarovo, Kulikovskoye Rural Settlement, Dmitrovsky District, Moscow Oblast, a village in Kulikovskoye Rural Settlement of Dmitrovsky District; 56°37′N 37°08′E
- Nazarovo, Istrinsky District, Moscow Oblast, a village in Yadrominskoye Rural Settlement of Istrinsky District; 56°03′N 36°37′E
- Nazarovo, Pushkinsky District, Moscow Oblast, a village in Tsarevskoye Rural Settlement of Pushkinsky District; 56°05′N 38°02′E
- Nazarovo, Stupinsky District, Moscow Oblast, a village in Semenovskoye Rural Settlement of Stupinsky District; 55°05′N 37°55′E
- Nazarovo, Yegoryevsky District, Moscow Oblast, a village under the administrative jurisdiction of the Town of Yegoryevsk in Yegoryevsky District; 55°24′N 39°09′E

=== Nizhny Novgorod Oblast ===
As of 2014, one rural locality in Nizhny Novgorod Oblast bears this name:

Nizhny Novgorod Oblast location map
Location of Nazarovo in Nizhny Novgorod Oblast
- Nazarovo, Nizhny Novgorod Oblast, a village in Khmelevitsky Selsoviet under the administrative jurisdiction of the town of oblast significance of Shakhunya; 57°44′N 46°24′E

=== Novosibirsk Oblast ===
As of 2014, one rural locality in Novosibirsk Oblast bears this name:

Novosibirsk Oblast location map
Location of Nazarovo in Novosibirsk Oblast
- Nazarovo, Novosibirsk Oblast, a selo in Kuybyshevsky District; 55°40′N 77°33′E

=== Perm Krai ===
As of 2014, one rural locality in Perm Krai bears this name:

- Nazarovo, Perm Krai, a village in Permsky District

=== Ryazan Oblast ===
As of 2014, one rural locality in Ryazan Oblast bears this name:

- Nazarovo, Ryazan Oblast, a village in Pustynsky Rural Okrug of Kasimovsky District

=== Sverdlovsk Oblast ===
As of 2014, one rural locality in Sverdlovsk Oblast bears this name:

- Nazarovo, Sverdlovsk Oblast, a selo in Nazarovsky Selsoviet of Turinsky District

=== Tver Oblast ===
As of 2014, four rural localities in Tver Oblast bear this name:

- Nazarovo, Kimrsky District, Tver Oblast, a village in Neklyudovskoye Rural Settlement of Kimrsky District
- Nazarovo, Sosnovitskoye Rural Settlement, Likhoslavlsky District, Tver Oblast, a village in Sosnovitskoye Rural Settlement of Likhoslavlsky District
- Nazarovo, Tolmachevskoye Rural Settlement, Likhoslavlsky District, Tver Oblast, a village in Tolmachevskoye Rural Settlement of Likhoslavlsky District
- Nazarovo, Oleninsky District, Tver Oblast, a village in Glazkovskoye Rural Settlement of Oleninsky District

=== Tyumen Oblast ===
As of 2014, one rural locality in Tyumen Oblast bears this name:

- Nazarovo, Tyumen Oblast, a selo in Nazarovsky Rural Okrug of Abatsky District

=== Vladimir Oblast ===
As of 2014, three rural localities in Vladimir Oblast bear this name:

- Nazarovo, Kameshkovsky District, Vladimir Oblast, a village in Kameshkovsky District
- Nazarovo, Petushinsky District, Vladimir Oblast, a village in Petushinsky District
- Nazarovo, Sobinsky District, Vladimir Oblast, a village in Sobinsky District

=== Vologda Oblast ===
As of 2014, three rural localities in Vologda Oblast bear this name:

- Nazarovo, Babayevsky District, Vologda Oblast, a village in Novostarinsky Selsoviet of Babayevsky District
- Nazarovo, Sheksninsky District, Vologda Oblast, a village in Charomsky Selsoviet of Sheksninsky District
- Nazarovo, Vologodsky District, Vologda Oblast, a village in Leskovsky Selsoviet of Vologodsky District

=== Yaroslavl Oblast ===
As of 2014, seven rural localities in Yaroslavl Oblast bear this name:

- Nazarovo, Ryzhikovsky Rural Okrug, Danilovsky District, Yaroslavl Oblast, a village in Ryzhikovsky Rural Okrug of Danilovsky District
- Nazarovo, Semivragovsky Rural Okrug, Danilovsky District, Yaroslavl Oblast, a village in Semivragovsky Rural Okrug of Danilovsky District
- Nazarovo, Lyubimsky District, Yaroslavl Oblast, a village in Lyubimsky Rural Okrug of Lyubimsky District
- Nazarovo, Nekouzsky District, Yaroslavl Oblast, a village in Stanilovsky Rural Okrug of Nekouzsky District
- Nazarovo, Poshekhonsky District, Yaroslavl Oblast, a village in Priukhrinsky Rural Okrug of Poshekhonsky District
- Nazarovo, Rybinsky District, Yaroslavl Oblast, a village in Nazarovsky Rural Okrug of Rybinsky District
- Nazarovo, Tutayevsky District, Yaroslavl Oblast, a village in Nikolsky Rural Okrug of Tutayevsky District

== Abolished localities ==
- Nazarovo, Irkutsk Oblast, a selo in Ust-Kutsky District of Irkutsk Oblast; abolished in June 2015; 57°10′N 06°54′E
- Nazarovo, Khabarovsk Krai, a rural locality classified as an electric utility post in Ayano-Maysky District of Khabarovsk Krai; abolished in August 2011
