= Georgiyevsky (rural locality) =

Georgiyevsky (Russian: Гео́ргиевский; masculine), Georgiyevskaya (Гео́ргиевская; feminine), or Georgiyevskoye (Гео́ргиевское; neuter) is the name of several rural localities in Russia:

- Georgiyevsky, Republic of Bashkortostan, a khutor in Yanybayevsky Selsoviet of Zianchurinsky District of the Republic of Bashkortostan
- Georgiyevsky, Bryansk Oblast, a settlement in Staroselsky Selsoviet of Unechsky District of Bryansk Oblast
- Georgiyevsky, Khomutovsky District, Kursk Oblast, a settlement in Kalinovsky Selsoviet of Khomutovsky District of Kursk Oblast
- Georgiyevsky, Zheleznogorsky District, Kursk Oblast, a settlement in Volkovsky Selsoviet of Zheleznogorsky District of Kursk Oblast
- Georgiyevsky, Leningrad Oblast, a logging depot settlement in Kotelskoye Settlement Municipal Formation of Kingiseppsky District of Leningrad Oblast
- Georgiyevsky, Korsakovsky District, Oryol Oblast, a settlement in Novomikhaylovsky Selsoviet of Korsakovsky District of Oryol Oblast
- Georgiyevsky, Kromskoy District, Oryol Oblast, a settlement in Shakhovsky Selsoviet of Kromskoy District of Oryol Oblast
- Georgiyevsky, Penza Oblast, a settlement in Chernozersky Selsoviet of Mokshansky District of Penza Oblast
- Georgiyevsky, Tambov Oblast, a settlement under the administrative jurisdiction of Novolyadinsky Settlement Council, Tambovsky District, Tambov Oblast
- Georgiyevsky, Voronezh Oblast, a settlement in Voznesenovskoye Rural Settlement of Talovsky District of Voronezh Oblast
- Georgiyevskoye, Republic of Adygea, a selo in Giaginsky District of the Republic of Adygea
- Georgiyevskoye, Republic of Buryatia, a selo in Ashanginsky somon of Khorinsky District of the Republic of Buryatia
- Georgiyevskoye, Kineshemsky District, Ivanovo Oblast, a selo in Kineshemsky District, Ivanovo Oblast
- Georgiyevskoye, Privolzhsky District, Ivanovo Oblast, a selo in Privolzhsky District, Ivanovo Oblast
- Georgiyevskoye, Zavolzhsky District, Ivanovo Oblast, a selo in Zavolzhsky District, Ivanovo Oblast
- Georgiyevskoye, Kaliningrad Oblast, a settlement in Khrabrovsky Rural Okrug of Guryevsky District of Kaliningrad Oblast
- Georgiyevskoye, Kaluga Oblast, a village under the administrative jurisdiction of the city of Kaluga, Kaluga Oblast
- Georgiyevskoye, Antropovsky District, Kostroma Oblast, a selo in Palkinskoye Settlement of Antropovsky District of Kostroma Oblast
- Georgiyevskoye, Mezhevskoy District, Kostroma Oblast, a selo in Georgiyevskoye Settlement of Mezhevskoy District of Kostroma Oblast
- Georgiyevskoye, Krasnodar Krai, a selo in Georgiyevsky Rural Okrug of Tuapsinsky District of Krasnodar Krai
- Georgiyevskoye, Leningrad Oblast, a village under the administrative jurisdiction of Tosnenskoye Settlement Municipal Formation, Tosnensky District, Leningrad Oblast
- Georgiyevskoye, Lipetsk Oblast, a selo in Georgiyevsky Selsoviet of Stanovlyansky District of Lipetsk Oblast
- Georgiyevskoye, Sokolsky District, Nizhny Novgorod Oblast, a selo in Loyminsky Selsoviet of Sokolsky District of Nizhny Novgorod Oblast
- Georgiyevskoye, Vetluzhsky District, Nizhny Novgorod Oblast, a village in Volynovsky Selsoviet of Vetluzhsky District of Nizhny Novgorod Oblast
- Georgiyevskoye, Oryol Oblast, a selo in Bogdanovsky Selsoviet of Uritsky District of Oryol Oblast
- Georgiyevskoye, Tula Oblast, a village in Bezhkovsky Rural Okrug of Leninsky District of Tula Oblast
- Georgiyevskoye, Bezhetsky District, Tver Oblast, a selo in Bezhetsky District, Tver Oblast
- Georgiyevskoye, Rameshkovsky District, Tver Oblast, a selo in Rameshkovsky District, Tver Oblast
- Georgiyevskoye, Belozersky District, Vologda Oblast, a selo in Georgiyevsky Selsoviet of Belozersky District of Vologda Oblast
- Georgiyevskoye, Sokolsky District, Vologda Oblast, a selo in Vorobyevsky Selsoviet of Sokolsky District of Vologda Oblast
- Georgiyevskoye, Borisoglebsky District, Yaroslavl Oblast, a selo in Davydovsky Rural Okrug of Borisoglebsky District of Yaroslavl Oblast
- Georgiyevskoye, Danilovsky District, Yaroslavl Oblast, a selo in Yermakovsky Rural Okrug of Danilovsky District of Yaroslavl Oblast
- Georgiyevskaya, Ivanovo Oblast, a village in Pestyakovsky District of Ivanovo Oblast
- Georgiyevskaya, Lodeynopolsky District, Leningrad Oblast, a village in Vakhnovokarskoye Settlement Municipal Formation of Lodeynopolsky District of Leningrad Oblast
- Georgiyevskaya, Volkhovsky District, Leningrad Oblast, a settlement of the crossing in Kolchanovskoye Settlement Municipal Formation of Volkhovsky District of Leningrad Oblast
- Georgiyevskaya, Pskov Oblast, a village in Pskovsky District of Pskov Oblast
- Georgiyevskaya, Georgiyevsky District, Stavropol Krai, a stanitsa in Georgiyevskaya Selsoviet of Georgiyevsky District of Stavropol Krai
- Georgiyevskaya, Kochubeyevsky District, Stavropol Krai, a stanitsa in Georgiyevsky Selsoviet of Kochubeyevsky District of Stavropol Krai
- Georgiyevskaya, Vologda Oblast, a village in Korobitsinsky Selsoviet of Syamzhensky District of Vologda Oblast
