= Georgiev =

Georgiev (Bulgarian: Георгиев) (feminine: Georgieva) is a Bulgarian surname that is derived from the male given name Georgi and literally means Georgi's. It may refer to:

- Alexandar Georgiev (born 1996), Bulgarian–Russian professional ice hockey player
- Alexander Georgiev (born 1975), Russian draughts player
- Anka Georgieva (born 1959), Bulgarian rowing coxswain
- Antonina Georgieva (born 1948), Bulgarian and Serbian chess player and Woman International Master
- Blagoy Georgiev (born 1981), Bulgarian footballer
- Boris Georgiev (born 1982), Bulgarian amateur boxer
- Damyan Georgiev (1950–2022), Bulgarian footballer and coach
- Daniela Georgieva (born 1969), retired Bulgarian sprinter
- Daniel Georgiev (born 1982), Bulgarian footballer
- Diliana Georgieva (born 1965), Bulgarian individual rhythmic gymnast
- Elena Georgieva (1930–2007), Bulgarian linguist who revolutionized the way that the Bulgarian language is studied
- Evlogi Georgiev (1819–1897), Bulgarian merchant, banker and benefactor
- Gabriela Georgieva (born 1997), Bulgarian swimmer
- Galin Georgiev (born 1969), Bulgarian triple jumper
- Georgi Georgiev (born 1963), Bulgarian footballer
- Georgi Georgiev (born 1988), Bulgarian footballer
- Georgi Georgiev (born 1976), Bulgarian judoka
- Greta Georgieva (born 1965), Bulgarian rowing coxswain
- Georgi Georgiev-Getz (1926–1996), Bulgarian actor
- Hristina Georgieva (born 1972), female javelin thrower from Bulgaria
- Hristo Georgiev (canoeist), Bulgarian canoeist
- Hristo Georgiev (patron), Bulgarian patron
- Irina Georgieva Bokova (born 1952), Bulgarian politician and the former Director-General of UNESCO (2009–2017)
- Ivana Georgieva (born 1971), Bulgarian fencer
- Ivo Georgiev (1972–2021), Bulgarian footballer
- Kapka Georgieva (born 1951), Bulgarian rower who competed in the 1976 Summer Olympics
- Kimon Georgiev (1882–1969), Bulgarian general and prime minister
- Kiril Georgiev (born 1965), Bulgarian chess player
- Kristalina Georgieva (born 1953), Bulgarian politician and the current chief executive officer of the International Monetary Fund
- Kristina Georgieva (born 1992), Bulgarian beauty pageant titleholder who was crowned Miss Universe Bulgaria 2014
- Krum Georgiev (born 1958), Bulgarian chess player
- Magdalena Georgieva (born 1962), rower from Bulgaria
- Maria Luisa Doseva-Georgieva (1894–1975), one of the first two women licensed as an architect in Bulgaria
- Maya Georgieva (volleyball) (born 1955), Bulgarian former volleyball player who competed in the 1980 Summer Olympics
- Nadezhda Georgieva (born 1961), Bulgarian former sprinter
- Nelina Georgieva (born 1997), Bulgarian pop singer from the Bulgarian city of Kazanlak
- Penka Georgieva, mathematician in France
- Rosa Georgieva (born 1956), Bulgarian sprint canoeist who competed in the late 1970s
- Stanislav Georgiev (born 1971), Bulgarian runner
- Stanka Georgieva (born 1950), Bulgarian rowing coxswain
- Stoyan Georgiev (born 1986), Bulgarian footballer
- Tanya Georgieva (born 1970), Bulgarian sprint canoeist who competed in the early 1990s
- Tsvetana Georgieva Maneva (born 1944), Bulgarian actress
- Valeri Georgiev (born 1984), Bulgarian footballer
- Victoria Georgieva (born 1997), Bulgarian singer and songwriter who took part in the Eurovision Song Contest 2021
- Viliana Georgieva (born 1982), Bulgarian TV show host and model for designers
- Vladimir Georgiev (chess player) (born 1975), Bulgarian chess player
- Vladimir I. Georgiev (1908–1986), Bulgarian linguist, philologist, educational administrator
- Vlado Georgiev (born 1977), Serbian singer, composer and songwriter
- Zlatka Georgieva (born 1969), retired Bulgarian sprinter who specialized in the women's 200 metres

== See also ==
- Georgievski
- George (given name)
