= Gabbasovo =

Gabbasovo Габбасово
- Village
- Location within Bashkortostan Location within Russia
- Coordinates: 52°06′N 56°53′E
- Country: Russia
- Region: Bashkortostan
- District: Zianchurinsky District
- Time zone: UTC+5:00

Gabbasovo (Russian: Габбасово; Bashkir: Ғәббәс, Ğäbbäs) is a rural locality (a village) in Muynaksky Selsoviet, Zianchurinsky District, Bashkortostan, Russia. The population was 118 as of 2010. There is 1 street.

== Geography ==
Gabbasovo is located 42 km southeast of Isyangulovo (the district's administrative centre) by road. Umbetovo is the nearest rural locality.
