= Idyash =

Idyash Идяш
- Village
- Location within Bashkortostan Location within Russia
- Coordinates: 51°44′N 57°00′E
- Country: Russia
- Region: Bashkortostan
- District: Zianchurinsky District
- Time zone: UTC+5:00

Idyash (Russian: Идяш; Bashkir: Иҙәш, İźäş) is a rural locality (a village) in Utyagulovsky Selsoviet, Zianchurinsky District, Bashkortostan, Russia. The population was 613 as of 2010. There are 5 streets.

== Geography ==
Idyash is located 70 km southeast of Isyangulovo (the district's administrative centre) by road. Utyagulovo is the nearest rural locality.
