= Lukyanovsky =

Lukyanovsky Лукьяновский
- Village
- Location within Bashkortostan Location within Russia
- Coordinates: 51°52′N 56°57′E
- Country: Russia
- Region: Bashkortostan
- District: Zianchurinsky District
- Time zone: UTC+5:00

Lukyanovsky (Russian: Лукьяновский) is a rural locality (a village) in Utyagulovsky Selsoviet, Zianchurinsky District, Bashkortostan, Russia. The population was 50 as of 2010. There is 1 street.

== Geography ==
Lukyanovsky is located 105 km southeast of Isyangulovo (the district's administrative centre) by road. Akdavletovo is the nearest rural locality.
