= Nizhnyaya Akberda =

Nizhnyaya Akberda Нижняя Акберда
- Village
- Location within Bashkortostan Location within Russia
- Coordinates: 52°00′N 56°45′E
- Country: Russia
- Region: Bashkortostan
- District: Zianchurinsky District
- Time zone: UTC+5:00

Nizhnyaya Akberda (Russian: Нижняя Акберда; Bashkir: Түбәнге Аҡбирҙе, Tübänge Aqbirźe) is a rural locality (a village) in Muynaksky Selsoviet, Zianchurinsky District, Bashkortostan, Russia. The population was 127 as of 2010. There are 3 streets.

== Geography ==
Nizhnyaya Akberda is located 29 km southeast of Isyangulovo (the district's administrative centre) by road. Verkhny Muynak is the nearest rural locality.
