= Kyzylyarovo, Zianchurinsky District, Republic of Bashkortostan =

Kyzylyarovo Кызылярово
- Village
- Location within Bashkortostan Location within Russia
- Coordinates: 51°37′N 57°09′E
- Country: Russia
- Region: Bashkortostan
- District: Zianchurinsky District
- Time zone: UTC+5:00

Kyzylyarovo (Russian: Кызылярово; Bashkir: Ҡыҙылъяр, Qıźılyar) is a rural locality (a village) in Yanybayevsky Selsoviet, Zianchurinsky District, Bashkortostan, Russia. The population was 98 as of 2010. There are 2 streets.

== Geography ==
Kyzylyarovo is located 148 km southeast of Isyangulovo (the district's administrative centre) by road. Nizhneye Mambetshino is the nearest rural locality.
