= Nizhnyaya Bikberda =

Nizhnyaya Bikberda Нижняя Бикберда
- Village
- Location within Bashkortostan Location within Russia
- Coordinates: 52°15′N 56°47′E
- Country: Russia
- Region: Bashkortostan
- District: Zianchurinsky District
- Time zone: UTC+5:00

Nizhnyaya Bikberda (Russian: Нижняя Бикберда; Bashkir: Түбәнге Бикбирҙе, Tübänge Bikbirźe) is a rural locality (a village) in Bikbausky Selsoviet, Zianchurinsky District, Bashkortostan, Russia. The population was 268 as of 2010. There are 4 streets.

== Geography ==
Nizhnyaya Bikberda is located 23 km northeast of Isyangulovo (the district's administrative centre) by road. Verkhnyaya Bikberda is the nearest rural locality.
