= Bashkirskaya Urginka =

Bashkirskaya Urginka Башкирская Ургинка
- Village
- Location within Bashkortostan Location within Russia
- Coordinates: 52°16′N 56°39′E
- Country: Russia
- Region: Bashkortostan
- District: Zianchurinsky District
- Time zone: UTC+5:00

Bashkirskaya Urginka (Russian: Башкирская Ургинка; Bashkir: Башҡорт Үргене, Başqort Ürgene) is a rural locality (a village) in Novopetrovsky Selsoviet, Zianchurinsky District, Bashkortostan, Russia. The population was 866 as of 2010. There are 9 streets.

== Geography ==
Bashkirskaya Urginka is located 15 km southwest of Isyangulovo (the district's administrative centre) by road. Novopetrovskoye is the nearest rural locality.
