= Russkaya Urginka =

Russkaya Urginka Русская Ургинка
- Village
- Location within Bashkortostan Location within Russia
- Coordinates: 52°15′N 56°34′E
- Country: Russia
- Region: Bashkortostan
- District: Zianchurinsky District
- Time zone: UTC+5:00

Russkaya Urginka (Russian: Русская Ургинка; Bashkir: Урыҫ Үргене, Urıś Ürgene) is a rural locality (a village) in Novopetrovsky Selsoviet, Zianchurinsky District, Bashkortostan, Russia. The population was 20 as of 2010. There is 1 street.

== Geography ==
Russkaya Urginka is located 9 km north of Isyangulovo (the district's administrative centre) by road. Simbirsky is the nearest rural locality.
