= Ibrayevo, Zianchurinsky District, Republic of Bashkortostan =

Ibrayevo Ибраево
- Village
- Location within Bashkortostan Location within Russia
- Coordinates: 52°15′N 56°57′E
- Country: Russia
- Region: Bashkortostan
- District: Zianchurinsky District
- Time zone: UTC+5:00

Ibrayevo (Russian: Ибраево; Bashkir: Ибрай, İbray) is a rural locality (a village) in Baydavletovsky Selsoviet, Zianchurinsky District, Bashkortostan, Russia. The population was 479 as of 2010. There are 4 streets.

== Geography ==
Ibrayevo is located 39 km northeast of Isyangulovo (the district's administrative centre) by road. Sazala is the nearest rural locality.
