= Utyagulovo =

Utyagulovo Утягулово
- Village
- Location within Bashkortostan Location within Russia
- Coordinates: 51°42′N 57°02′E
- Country: Russia
- Region: Bashkortostan
- District: Zianchurinsky District
- Time zone: UTC+5:00

Utyagulovo (Russian: Утягулово; Bashkir: Үтәғол, Ütäğol) is a rural locality (a village) and the administrative centre of Utyagulovsky Selsoviet, Zianchurinsky District, Bashkortostan, Russia. The population was 478 as of 2010. There are 5 streets.

== Geography ==
Utyagulovo is located 74 km southeast of Isyangulovo (the district's administrative centre) by road. Yunayevo is the nearest rural locality.
