= Sagitovo, Zianchurinsky District, Republic of Bashkortostan =

Sagitovo Сагитово
- Village
- Location within Bashkortostan Location within Russia
- Coordinates: 51°48′N 57°06′E
- Country: Russia
- Region: Bashkortostan
- District: Zianchurinsky District
- Time zone: UTC+5:00

Sagitovo (Russian: Сагитово; Bashkir: Сәғит, Säğit) is a rural locality (a village) in Baishevsky Selsoviet, Zianchurinsky District, Bashkortostan, Russia. The population was 243 as of 2010. There are 4 streets.

== Geography ==
Sagitovo is located 89 km southeast of Isyangulovo (the district's administrative centre) by road. Baishevo is the nearest rural locality.
