= Derevnya fermy 3 Sakmarskogo sovkhoza =

Derevnya fermy 3 Sakmarskogo sovkhoza Деревня фермы № 3 Сакмарского совхоза
- Village
- Location within Bashkortostan Location within Russia
- Coordinates: 51°40′N 56°52′E
- Country: Russia
- Region: Bashkortostan
- District: Zianchurinsky District
- Time zone: UTC+5:00

Derevnya fermy 3 Sakmarskogo sovkhoza (Russian: Деревня фермы № 3 Сакмарского совхоза; Bashkir: Һаҡмар совхозының 3-сө фермаһы, Haqmar sovxozınıñ 3-sö fermahı) is a rural locality (a village) in Sakmarsky Selsoviet, Zianchurinsky District, Bashkortostan, Russia. The population was 194 as of 2010. There are 3 streets.

== Geography ==
The village is located 71 km south of Isyangulovo (the district's administrative centre) by road. Arsyonovo is the nearest rural locality.
