= Khudabandino =

Khudabandino Худабандино
- Village
- Location within Bashkortostan Location within Russia
- Coordinates: 52°09′N 56°57′E
- Country: Russia
- Region: Bashkortostan
- District: Zianchurinsky District
- Time zone: UTC+5:00

Khudabandino (Russian: Худабандино; Bashkir: Хоҙайбәндә, Xoźaybändä) is a rural locality (a village) in Surensky Selsoviet, Zianchurinsky District, Bashkortostan, Russia. The population was 112 as of 2010. There are 2 streets.

== Geography ==
Khudabandino is located 30 km east of Isyangulovo (the district's administrative centre) by road. Kugarchi is the nearest rural locality.
