= Novyye Chebenki =

Novyye Chebenki Новые Чебенки
- Selo
- Location within Bashkortostan Location within Russia
- Coordinates: 52°12′N 56°20′E
- Country: Russia
- Region: Bashkortostan
- District: Zianchurinsky District
- Time zone: UTC+5:00

Novyye Chebenki (Russian: Новые Чебенки; Bashkir: Яңы Себенле, Yañı Sebenle) is a rural locality (a selo) in Novochebenkinsky Selsoviet, Zianchurinsky District, Bashkortostan, Russia. The population was 593 as of 2010. There are 6 streets.

== Geography ==
Novyye Chebenki is located 25 km west of Isyangulovo (the district's administrative centre) by road. Ishemgul is the nearest rural locality.
