= Kuzhanak =

Kuzhanak Кужанак
- Village
- Location within Bashkortostan Location within Russia
- Coordinates: 51°36′N 57°10′E
- Country: Russia
- Region: Bashkortostan
- District: Zianchurinsky District
- Time zone: UTC+5:00

Kuzhanak (Russian: Кужанак; Bashkir: Ҡужанаҡ, Qujanaq) is a rural locality (a village) in Yanybayevsky Selsoviet, Zianchurinsky District, Bashkortostan, Russia. The population was 420 as of 2010. There are 4 streets.

== Geography ==
Kuzhanak is located 144 km southeast of Isyangulovo (the district's administrative centre) by road. Nizhneye Mambetshino is the nearest rural locality.
