= Tiryakle =

Tiryakle Тирякле
- Village
- Location within Bashkortostan Location within Russia
- Coordinates: 51°41′N 56°46′E
- Country: Russia
- Region: Bashkortostan
- District: Zianchurinsky District
- Time zone: UTC+5:00

Tiryakle (Russian: Тирякле; Bashkir: Тирәкле, Tiräkle) is a rural locality (a village) in Sakmarsky Selsoviet, Zianchurinsky District, Bashkortostan, Russia. The population was 75 as of 2010. There are 2 streets.

== Geography ==
Tiryakle is located 100 km southeast of Isyangulovo (the district's administrative centre) by road. Ryskulovo is the nearest rural locality.
