= Seregulovo =

Seregulovo Серегулово
- Village
- Location within Bashkortostan Location within Russia
- Coordinates: 52°15′N 56°53′E
- Country: Russia
- Region: Bashkortostan
- District: Zianchurinsky District
- Time zone: UTC+5:00

Seregulovo (Russian: Серегулово; Bashkir: Сиреғол, Sireğol) is a rural locality (a village) and the administrative centre of Baydavletovsky Selsoviet, Zianchurinsky District, Bashkortostan, Russia. The population was 306 as of 2010. There are 4 streets.

== Geography ==
Seregulovo is located 33 km northeast of Isyangulovo (the district's administrative centre) by road. Sazala is the nearest rural locality.
