= Arsyonovo =

Arsyonovo Арсёново
- Selo
- Location within Bashkortostan Location within Russia
- Coordinates: 51°37′N 56°49′E
- Country: Russia
- Region: Bashkortostan
- District: Zianchurinsky District
- Time zone: UTC+5:00

Arsyonovo (Russian: Арсёново; Bashkir: Арсен, Arsen) is a rural locality (a selo) and the administrative centre of Sakmarsky Selsoviet, Zianchurinsky District, Bashkortostan, Russia. The population was 560 as of 2010. There are 9 streets.

== Geography ==
Arsyonovo is located 126 km southeast of Isyangulovo (the district's administrative centre) by road. Ryskulovo is the nearest rural locality.
