= Kuzebekovo =

Kuzebekovo Кузебеково
- Village
- Location within Bashkortostan Location within Russia
- Coordinates: 52°12′N 56°24′E
- Country: Russia
- Region: Bashkortostan
- District: Zianchurinsky District
- Time zone: UTC+5:00

Kuzebekovo (Russian: Кузебеково; Bashkir: Ҡужабаҡ, Qujabaq) is a rural locality (a village) in Novochebenkinsky Selsoviet, Zianchurinsky District, Bashkortostan, Russia. The population was 157 as of 2010. There are 6 streets.

== Geography ==
Kuzebekovo is located 21 km west of Isyangulovo (the district's administrative centre) by road. Novye Chebenki is the nearest rural locality.
