= Akdavletovo =

Akdavletovo Акдавлетово
- Village
- Location within Bashkortostan Location within Russia
- Coordinates: 51°53′N 57°00′E
- Country: Russia
- Region: Bashkortostan
- District: Zianchurinsky District
- Time zone: UTC+5:00

Akdavletovo (Russian: Акдавлетово; Bashkir: Аҡдәүләт, Aqdäwlät) is a rural locality (a village) in Baishevsky Selsoviet, Zianchurinsky District, Bashkortostan, Russia. The population was 84 as of 2010. There are 3 streets.

== Geography ==
Akdavletovo is located 101 km southeast of Isyangulovo (the district's administrative centre) by road. Lukyanovsky is the nearest rural locality.
