= Niyazgulovo, Zianchurinsky District, Republic of Bashkortostan =

Niyazgulovo Ниязгулово
- Village
- Location within Bashkortostan Location within Russia
- Coordinates: 51°51′N 56°44′E
- Country: Russia
- Region: Bashkortostan
- District: Zianchurinsky District
- Time zone: UTC+5:00

Niyazgulovo (Russian: Ниязгулово; Bashkir: Нияҙғол, Niyaźğol) is a rural locality (a village) in Abzanovsky Selsoviet, Zianchurinsky District, Bashkortostan, Russia. The population was 119 as of 2010. There are 2 streets.

== Geography ==
Niyazgulovo is located 47 km south of Isyangulovo (the district's administrative centre) by road. Abzanovo is the nearest rural locality.
