= Mazitovo =

Mazitovo Мазитово
- Village
- Location within Bashkortostan Location within Russia
- Coordinates: 52°03′N 56°53′E
- Country: Russia
- Region: Bashkortostan
- District: Zianchurinsky District
- Time zone: UTC+5:00

Mazitovo (Russian: Мазитово; Bashkir: Мәзит, Mäzit) is a rural locality (a village) in Muynaksky Selsoviet, Zianchurinsky District, Bashkortostan, Russia. The population was 212 as of 2010. There are 3 streets.

== Geography ==
Mazitovo is located 40 km southeast of Isyangulovo (the district's administrative centre) by road. Umbetovo is the nearest rural locality.
