= Tazlarovo =

Tazlarovo Тазларово
- Selo
- Location within Bashkortostan Location within Russia
- Coordinates: 52°08′N 56°41′E
- Country: Russia
- Region: Bashkortostan
- District: Zianchurinsky District
- Time zone: UTC+5:00

Tazlarovo (Russian: Тазларово; Bashkir: Таҙлар, Taźlar) is a rural locality (a selo) and the administrative centre of Tazlarovsky Selsoviet, Zianchurinsky District, Bashkortostan, Russia. The population was 1,119 as of 2010. There are 25 streets.

== Geography ==
Tazlarovo is located 9 km southeast of Isyangulovo (the district's administrative centre) by road. Ivanovka is the nearest rural locality.
