= Yunayevo =

Yunayevo Юнаево
- Village
- Location within Bashkortostan Location within Russia
- Coordinates: 51°43′N 57°04′E
- Country: Russia
- Region: Bashkortostan
- District: Zianchurinsky District
- Time zone: UTC+5:00

Yunayevo (Russian: Юнаево; Bashkir: Юнай, Yunay) is a rural locality (a village) in Utyagulovsky Selsoviet, Zianchurinsky District, Bashkortostan, Russia. The population was 183 as of 2010. There are 2 streets.

== Geography ==
Yunayevo is located 77 km southeast of Isyangulovo (the district's administrative centre) by road. Utyagulovo is the nearest rural locality.
