= Bashkirskaya Chumaza =

Bashkirskaya Chumaza Башкирская Чумаза
- Village
- Location within Bashkortostan Location within Russia
- Coordinates: 51°56′N 56°47′E
- Country: Russia
- Region: Bashkortostan
- District: Zianchurinsky District
- Time zone: UTC+5:00

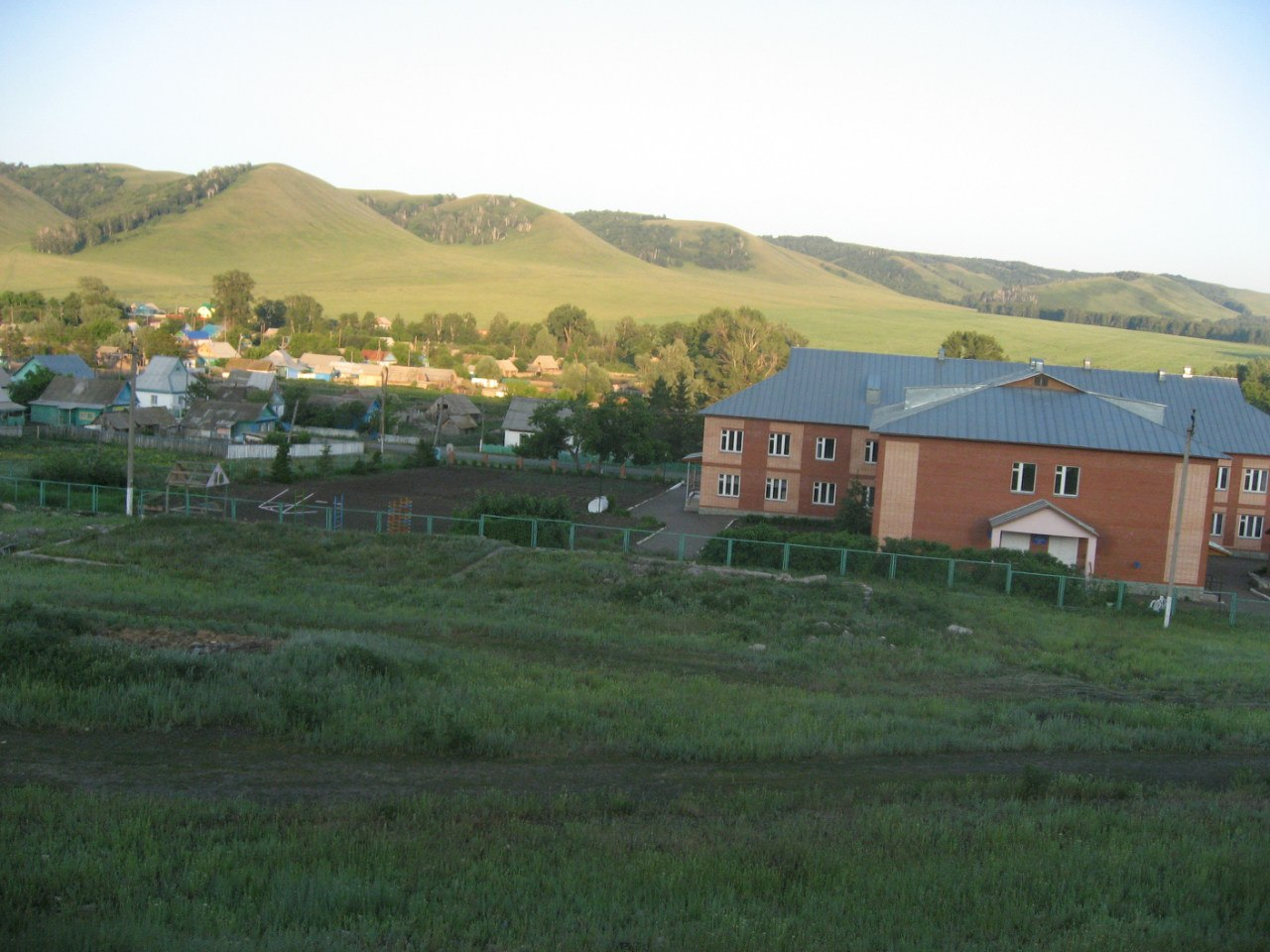
Bashkir Chumaza

Bashkirskaya Chumaza (Russian: Башкирская Чумаза; Bashkir: Башҡорт Самаҙыһы, Başqort Samaźıhı) is a rural locality (a village) in Abzanovsky Selsoviet, Zianchurinsky District, Bashkortostan, Russia. The population was 404 as of 2010. There are 7 streets.

== Geography ==
Bashkirskaya Chumaza is located 36 km southeast of Isyangulovo (the district's administrative centre) by road. Nizhnyaya Akberda is the nearest rural locality.
