= Nizhny Muynak =

Nizhny Muynak Нижний Муйнак
- Village
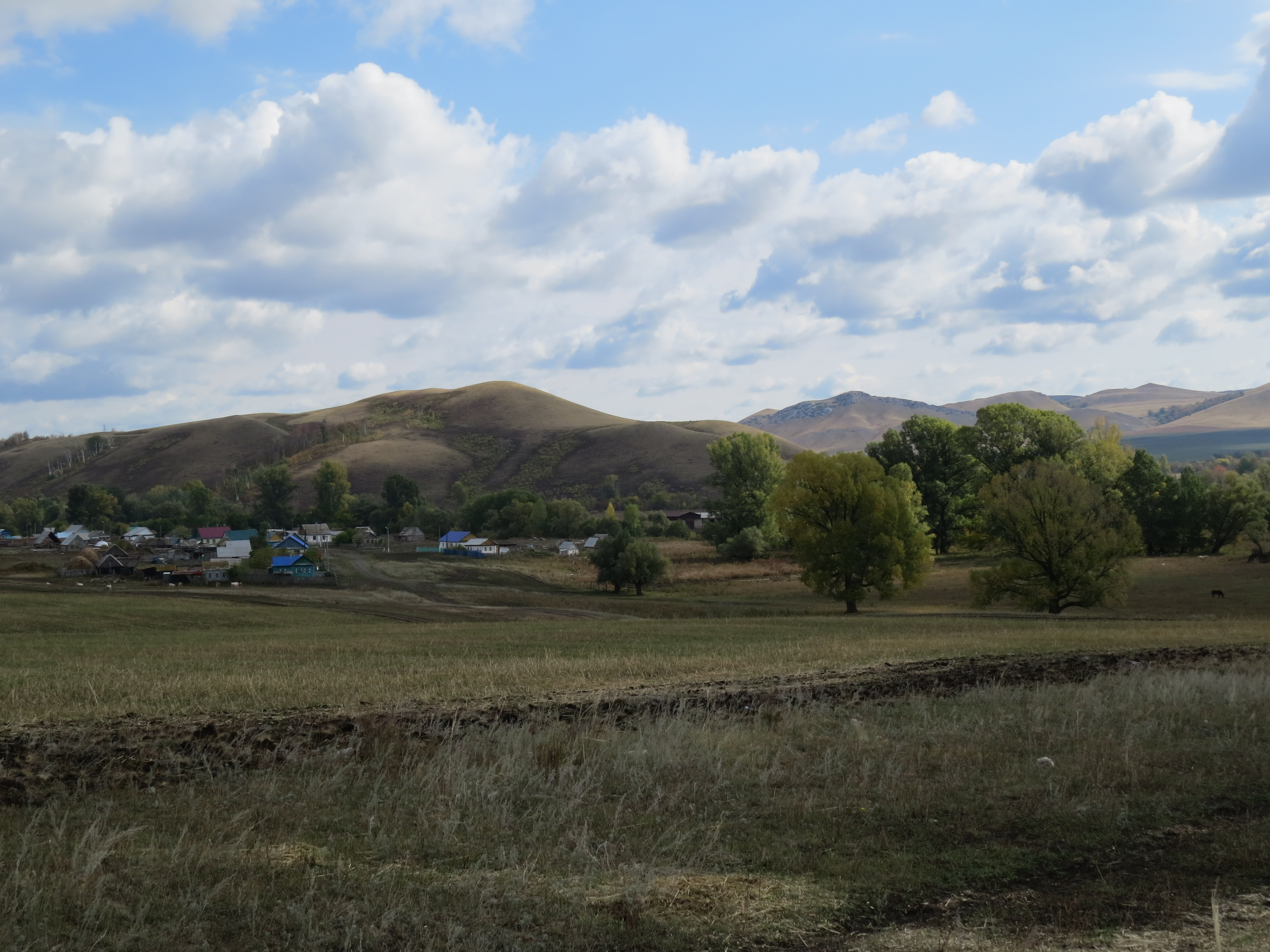
- Nizhny Muynak

- Location within Bashkortostan Location within Russia
- Coordinates: 51°59′N 56°42′E
- Country: Russia
- Region: Bashkortostan
- District: Zianchurinsky District
- Time zone: UTC+5:00

Nizhny Muynak (Russian: Нижний Муйнак; Bashkir: Түбәнге Муйнаҡ, Tübänge Muynaq) is a rural locality (a village) in Muynaksky Selsoviet, Zianchurinsky District, Bashkortostan, Russia. The population was 73 as of 2010. There is 1 street.

== Geography ==
Nizhny Muynak is located 30 km southeast of Isyangulovo (the district's administrative centre) by road. Nizhnyaya Akberda is the nearest rural locality.
