= Sazala =

Sazala Сазала
- Village
- Location within Bashkortostan Location within Russia
- Coordinates: 52°15′N 56°55′E
- Country: Russia
- Region: Bashkortostan
- District: Zianchurinsky District
- Time zone: UTC+5:00

Sazala (Russian: Сазала; Bashkir: Саҙалы, Saźalı) is a rural locality (a village) in Baydavletovsky Selsoviet, Zianchurinsky District, Bashkortostan, Russia. The population was 93 as of 2010. There is 1 street.

== Geography ==
Sazala is located 36 km northeast of Isyangulovo (the district's administrative centre) by road. Ibrayevo is the nearest rural locality.
