= Idelbakovo =

Idelbakovo Идельбаково
- Village
- Location within Bashkortostan Location within Russia
- Coordinates: 51°45′N 57°08′E
- Country: Russia
- Region: Bashkortostan
- District: Zianchurinsky District
- Time zone: UTC+5:00

Idelbakovo (Russian: Идельбаково; Bashkir: Иҙелбәк, İźelbäk) is a rural locality (a village) and the administrative centre of Kazanbulaksky Selsoviet, Zianchurinsky District, Bashkortostan, Russia. The population was 1,283 as of 2010, and the village contains 14 streets.

== Geography ==
Idelbakovo is located 84 km southeast of Isyangulovo (the district's administrative centre) by road. Yunayevo is the nearest rural locality.
