= Novomikhaylovsky, Zianchurinsky District, Republic of Bashkortostan =

Novomikhaylovsky Новомихайловский
- Village
- Location within Bashkortostan Location within Russia
- Coordinates: 51°57′N 57°06′E
- Country: Russia
- Region: Bashkortostan
- District: Zianchurinsky District
- Time zone: UTC+5:00

Novomikhaylovsky (Russian: Новомихайловский) is a rural locality (a village) in Baishevsky Selsoviet, Zianchurinsky District, Bashkortostan, Russia. The population was 11 as of 2010. There is 1 street.

== Geography ==
Novomikhaylovsky is located 107 km southeast of Isyangulovo (the district's administrative centre) by road. Bishtiryak is the nearest rural locality.
