= Kargala, Republic of Bashkortostan =

Kargala Каргала
- Village
- Location within Bashkortostan Location within Russia
- Coordinates: 52°07′N 57°05′E
- Country: Russia
- Region: Bashkortostan
- District: Zianchurinsky District
- Time zone: UTC+5:00

Kargala (Russian: Каргала; Bashkir: Ҡарғалы, Qarğalı) is a rural locality (a village) in Surensky Selsoviet, Zianchurinsky District, Bashkortostan, Russia. The population was 186 as of 2010. There are 3 streets.

== Geography ==
Kargala is located 47 km east of Isyangulovo (the district's administrative centre) by road. Verkhnyaya Kazarma is the nearest rural locality.
