= Kalimullino =

Kalimullino Калимуллино
- Village
- Location within Bashkortostan Location within Russia
- Coordinates: 52°12′N 56°19′E
- Country: Russia
- Region: Bashkortostan
- District: Zianchurinsky District
- Time zone: UTC+5:00

Kalimullino (Russian: Калимуллино; Bashkir: Кәлимулла, Kälimulla) is a rural locality (a village) in Novochebenkinsky Selsoviet, Zianchurinsky District, Bashkortostan, Russia. The population was 74 as of 2010. There is 1 street.

== Geography ==
Kalimullino is located 27 km west of Isyangulovo (the district's administrative centre) by road. Novye Chebenki is the nearest rural locality.
