= Ishemgul =

Ishemgul Ишемгул
- Selo
- Location within Bashkortostan Location within Russia
- Coordinates: 52°11′N 56°18′E
- Country: Russia
- Region: Bashkortostan
- District: Zianchurinsky District
- Time zone: UTC+5:00

Ishemgul (Russian: Ишемгул; Bashkir: Ишемғол, İşemğol) is a rural locality (a selo) and the administrative centre of Novochebenkinsky Selsoviet, Zianchurinsky District, Bashkortostan, Russia. The population was 671 as of 2010. There are 10 streets.

== Geography ==
Ishemgul is located 27 km west of Isyangulovo (the district's administrative centre) by road. Novye Chebenki is the nearest rural locality.
