= Verkhneye Mambetshino =

Verkhneye Mambetshino Верхнее Мамбетшино
- Village
- Location within Bashkortostan Location within Russia
- Coordinates: 51°43′N 57°17′E
- Country: Russia
- Region: Bashkortostan
- District: Zianchurinsky District
- Time zone: UTC+5:00

Verkhneye Mambetshino (Russian: Верхнее Мамбетшино; Bashkir: Үрге Мәмбәтша, Ürge Mämbätşa) is a rural locality (a village) in Yanybayevsky Selsoviet, Zianchurinsky District, Bashkortostan, Russia. The population was 265 as of 2010. There are 3 streets.

== Geography ==
Verkhneye Mambetshino is located 101 km southeast of Isyangulovo (the district's administrative centre) by road. Yanybayevo is the nearest rural locality.
