= Buzhan, Zianchurinsky District, Republic of Bashkortostan =

Village in Bashkortostan, Russia

Buzhan Бужан
- Village
- Location within Bashkortostan Location within Russia
- Coordinates: 51°46′N 56°47′E
- Country: Russia
- Region: Bashkortostan
- District: Zianchurinsky District
- Time zone: UTC+5:00

Buzhan (Russian: Бужан; Bashkir: Бүжән, Büjän) is a rural locality (a village) in Abulyaisovsky Selsoviet, Zianchurinsky District, Bashkortostan, Russia. The population was 72 as of 2010. There are two streets.

== Geography ==
Buzhan is located 60 km south of Isyangulovo (the district's administrative centre) by road. Malinovka is the nearest rural locality.
