= Bikbau =

Bikbau Бикбау
- Selo
- Location within Bashkortostan Location within Russia
- Coordinates: 52°12′N 56°44′E
- Country: Russia
- Region: Bashkortostan
- District: Zianchurinsky District
- Time zone: UTC+5:00

Bikbau (Russian: Бикбау; Bashkir: Бикбау, Bikbaw) is a rural locality (a selo) in Bikbausky Selsoviet, Zianchurinsky District, Bashkortostan, Russia. The population was 199 as of 2010. There are 3 streets.

== Geography ==
Bikbau is located 17 km east of Isyangulovo (the district's administrative centre) by road. Karadygan is the nearest rural locality.
