= Malinovka, Zianchurinsky District, Republic of Bashkortostan =

Malinovka Малиновка
- Village
- Location within Bashkortostan Location within Russia
- Coordinates: 51°46′N 56°52′E
- Country: Russia
- Region: Bashkortostan
- District: Zianchurinsky District
- Time zone: UTC+5:00

Malinovka (Russian: Малиновка) is a rural locality (a village) and the administrative centre of Abulyaisovsky Selsoviet, Zianchurinsky District, Bashkortostan, Russia. The population was 345 as of 2010. There are 4 streets.

== Geography ==
Malinovka is located 59 km southeast of Isyangulovo (the district's administrative centre) by road. Abulyaisovo is the nearest rural locality.
