= Agurda =

Agurda Агурда
- Village
- Location within Bashkortostan Location within Russia
- Coordinates: 51°54′N 57°07′E
- Country: Russia
- Region: Bashkortostan
- District: Zianchurinsky District
- Time zone: UTC+5:00

Agurda (Russian: Агурда; Bashkir: Ағурҙа, Ağurźa) is a rural locality (a village) in Baishevsky Selsoviet, Zianchurinsky District, Bashkortostan, Russia. The population was 89 as of 2010. There is 1 street.

== Geography ==
Agurda is located 104 km southeast of Isyangulovo (the district's administrative centre) by road. Bishtiryak is the nearest rural locality.
