= Kinzyabulatovo =

Kinzyabulatovo Кинзябулатово
- Village
- Location within Bashkortostan Location within Russia
- Coordinates: 52°09′N 56°48′E
- Country: Russia
- Region: Bashkortostan
- District: Zianchurinsky District
- Time zone: UTC+5:00

Kinzyabulatovo (Russian: Кинзябулатово; Bashkir: Кинйәбулат, Kinyäbulat) is a rural locality (a village) in Surensky Selsoviet, Zianchurinsky District, Bashkortostan, Russia. The population was 183 as of 2010. There are 2 streets.

== Geography ==
Kinzyabulatovo is located 19 km southeast of Isyangulovo (the district's administrative centre) by road. Kugarchi is the nearest rural locality.
