= Bishtiryak =

Bishtiryak Биштиряк
- Village
- Location within Bashkortostan Location within Russia
- Coordinates: 51°56′N 57°11′E
- Country: Russia
- Region: Bashkortostan
- District: Zianchurinsky District
- Time zone: UTC+5:00

Bishtiryak (Russian: Биштиряк; Bashkir: Биштирәк, Biştiräk) is a rural locality (a village) in Baishevsky Selsoviet, Zianchurinsky District, Bashkortostan, Russia. The population was 197 as of 2010. There are 2 streets.

== Geography ==
Bishtiryak is located 107 km southeast of Isyangulovo (the district's administrative centre) by road. Ilmalya is the nearest rural locality.
