= Maly Muynak =

Maly Muynak Малый Муйнак
- Village
- Location within Bashkortostan Location within Russia
- Coordinates: 52°07′N 56°45′E
- Country: Russia
- Region: Bashkortostan
- District: Zianchurinsky District
- Time zone: UTC+5:00

Maly Muynak (Russian: Малый Муйнак; Bashkir: Малай Муйнаҡ, Malay Muynaq) is a rural locality (a village) in Surensky Selsoviet, Zianchurinsky District, Bashkortostan, Russia. The population was 96 as of 2010. There is 1 street.

== Geography ==
Maly Muynak is located 16 km southeast of Isyangulovo (the district's administrative centre) by road. Bogdanovka is the nearest rural locality.
