= Baishevo, Zianchurinsky District, Republic of Bashkortostan =

Baishevo Баишево
- Village
- Location within Bashkortostan Location within Russia
- Coordinates: 51°50′N 57°05′E
- Country: Russia
- Region: Bashkortostan
- District: Zianchurinsky District
- Time zone: UTC+5:00

Baishevo (Russian: Баишево; Bashkir: Байыш, Bayış) is a rural locality (a village) and the administrative centre of Baishevsky Selsoviet, Zianchurinsky District, Bashkortostan, Russia. The population was 431 as of 2010. There are 9 streets.

== Geography ==
Baishevo is located 92 km southeast of Isyangulovo (the district's administrative centre) by road. Sagitovo is the nearest rural locality.
