= Kalininsky, Zianchurinsky District, Republic of Bashkortostan =

Kalininsky Калининский
- Khutor
- Location within Bashkortostan Location within Russia
- Coordinates: 51°38′N 57°13′E
- Country: Russia
- Region: Bashkortostan
- District: Zianchurinsky District
- Time zone: UTC+5:00

Kalininsky (Russian: Калининский) is a rural locality (a khutor) in Yanybayevsky Selsoviet, Zianchurinsky District, Bashkortostan, Russia. The population was 17 as of 2010. There is 1 street.

== Geography ==
Kalininsky is located 103 km southeast of Isyangulovo (the district's administrative centre) by road. Nizhneye Mambetshino is the nearest rural locality.
