= Mukhamedyanovo =

Mukhamedyanovo Мухамедьяново
- Village
- Location within Bashkortostan Location within Russia
- Coordinates: 51°58′N 56°56′E
- Country: Russia
- Region: Bashkortostan
- District: Zianchurinsky District
- Time zone: UTC+5:00

Mukhamedyanovo (Russian: Мухамедьяново; Bashkir: Мөхәмәтйән, Möxämätyän) is a rural locality (a village) in Abzanovsky Selsoviet, Zianchurinsky District, Bashkortostan, Russia. The population was 146 as of 2010. There is 1 street.

== Geography ==
Mukhamedyanovo is located 66 km southeast of Isyangulovo (the district's administrative centre) by road. Alibayevo is the nearest rural locality.
