= Verkhny Muynak =

Verkhny Muynak Верхний Муйнак
- Village
- Location within Bashkortostan Location within Russia
- Coordinates: 52°01′N 56°45′E
- Country: Russia
- Region: Bashkortostan
- District: Zianchurinsky District
- Time zone: UTC+5:00

Verkhny Muynak (Russian: Верхний Муйнак; Bashkir: Үрге Муйнаҡ, Ürge Muynaq) is a rural locality (a village) and the administrative centre of Muynaksky Selsoviet, Zianchurinsky District, Bashkortostan, Russia. The population was 490 as of 2010. There are 8 streets.

== Geography ==
Verkhny Muynak is located 25 km southeast of Isyangulovo (the district's administrative centre) by road. Sredny Muynak is the nearest rural locality.
