= Alibayevo =

Alibayevo Алибаево
- Village
- Location within Bashkortostan Location within Russia
- Coordinates: 51°56′N 56°55′E
- Country: Russia
- Region: Bashkortostan
- District: Zianchurinsky District
- Time zone: UTC+5:00

Alibayevo (Russian: Алибаево; Bashkir: Әлебай, Älebay) is a rural locality (a village) in Abzanovsky Selsoviet, Zianchurinsky District, Bashkortostan, Russia. The population was 140 as of 2010. There are 3 streets.

== Geography ==
Alibayevo is located 62 km southeast of Isyangulovo (the district's administrative centre) by road. Mukhamedyanovo is the nearest rural locality.
