= Verkhnyaya Bikberda =

Verkhnyaya Bikberda Верхняя Бикберда
- Village
- Location within Bashkortostan Location within Russia
- Coordinates: 52°16′N 56°46′E
- Country: Russia
- Region: Bashkortostan
- District: Zianchurinsky District
- Time zone: UTC+5:00

Verkhnyaya Bikberda (Russian: Верхняя Бикберда; Bashkir: Үрге Бикбирҙе, Ürge Bikbirźe) is a rural locality (a village) in Bikbausky Selsoviet, Zianchurinsky District, Bashkortostan, Russia. The population was 191 as of 2010. There are 4 streets.

== Geography ==
Verkhnyaya Bikberda is located 25 km northeast of Isyangulovo (the district's administrative centre) by road. Nizhnyaya Bikberda is the nearest rural locality.
