= Ayutovo =

Ayutovo Аютово
- Village
- Location within Bashkortostan Location within Russia
- Coordinates: 52°09′N 56°30′E
- Country: Russia
- Region: Bashkortostan
- District: Zianchurinsky District
- Time zone: UTC+5:00

Ayutovo (Russian: Аютово; Bashkir: Айыу, Ayıw) is a rural locality (a village) in Isyangulovsky Selsoviet, Zianchurinsky District, Bashkortostan, Russia. The population was 129 as of 2010. There are 2 streets.

== Geography ==
Ayutovo is located 9 km southwest of Isyangulovo (the district's administrative centre) by road. Novomikhaylovka is the nearest rural locality.
