= Yanybayevo, Zianchurinsky District, Republic of Bashkortostan =

Yanybayevo Яныбаево
- Village
- Location within Bashkortostan Location within Russia
- Coordinates: 51°41′N 57°15′E
- Country: Russia
- Region: Bashkortostan
- District: Zianchurinsky District
- Time zone: UTC+5:00

Yanybayevo (Russian: Яныбаево; Bashkir: Яңыбай, Yañıbay) is a rural locality (a village) and the administrative centre of Yanybayevsky Selsoviet, Zianchurinsky District, Bashkortostan, Russia. The population was 592 as of 2010. There are 7 streets.

== Geography ==
Yanybayevo is located 96 km southeast of Isyangulovo (the district's administrative centre) by road. Idelbakovo is the nearest rural locality.
