= Kazanka, Zianchurinsky District, Republic of Bashkortostan =

Kazanka Казанка
- Village
- Location within Bashkortostan Location within Russia
- Coordinates: 51°48′N 57°09′E
- Country: Russia
- Region: Bashkortostan
- District: Zianchurinsky District
- Time zone: UTC+5:00

Kazanka (Russian: Казанка) is a rural locality (a village) in Kazanbulaksky Selsoviet, Zianchurinsky District, Bashkortostan, Russia. The population was 303 as of 2010. There are 2 streets.

== Geography ==
Kazanka is located 89 km southeast of Isyangulovo (the district's administrative centre) by road. Sagitovo is the nearest rural locality.
