= Umbetovo =

Umbetovo Умбетово
- Village
- Location within Bashkortostan Location within Russia
- Coordinates: 52°03′N 56°48′E
- Country: Russia
- Region: Bashkortostan
- District: Zianchurinsky District
- Time zone: UTC+5:00

Umbetovo (Russian: Умбетово; Bashkir: Өмбәт, Ömbät) is a rural locality (a village) in Muynaksky Selsoviet, Zianchurinsky District, Bashkortostan, Russia. The population was 413 as of 2010. There are 7 streets.

== Geography ==
Umbetovo is located 33 km southeast of Isyangulovo (the district's administrative centre) by road. Verkhny Muynak is the nearest rural locality.
