= Georgievski =

Georgievski (Macedonian: Георгиевски) (feminine: Georgievska) is a Macedonian-language surname, meaning son of Georgi. Notable people with the surname include:

- Blagoja Georgievski (1950–2020), Macedonian basketball player and coach
- Daniel Georgievski (born 1988), Australian footballer
- Dejan Georgievski (born 1999), Macedonian taekwondo practitioner
- Goce Georgievski (born 1987), Macedonian handball player
- Goran Georgievski (1969–2005), Macedonian police commander
- Goran Georgievski (footballer) (born 1965), Macedonian footballer
- Hristijan Georgievski (born 2003), Macedonian footballer
- Ljubčo Georgievski (born 1966), Macedonian politician
- Panče Georgievski (born 1973), Macedonian footballer
- Slavčo Georgievski (born 1980), Macedonian footballer
- Vladimir Georgievski (born 1982), Macedonian basketball player
- Vladimir Georgievski (artist) (1942–2017), Macedonian painter and professor

== See also ==
- Georgiyevsky (disambiguation)
- Đorđević
- Georgiev
- George (surname)
- George (given name)
