= Suleymanovo, Zianchurinsky District, Republic of Bashkortostan =

Suleymanovo Сулейманово
- Village
- Location within Bashkortostan Location within Russia
- Coordinates: 52°11′N 56°50′E
- Country: Russia
- Region: Bashkortostan
- District: Zianchurinsky District
- Time zone: UTC+5:00

Suleymanovo (Russian: Сулейманово; Bashkir: Сөләймән, Söläymän) is a rural locality (a village) in Baydavletovsky Selsoviet, Zianchurinsky District, Bashkortostan, Russia. The population was 20 as of 2010. There is 1 street.

== Geography ==
Suleymanovo is located 26 km east of Isyangulovo (the district's administrative centre) by road. Baydavletovo is the nearest rural locality.
