= Bogdanovka, Zianchurinsky District, Republic of Bashkortostan =

Bogdanovka Богдановка
- Village
- Location within Bashkortostan Location within Russia
- Coordinates: 52°08′N 56°46′E
- Country: Russia
- Region: Bashkortostan
- District: Zianchurinsky District
- Time zone: UTC+5:00

Bogdanovka (Russian: Богдановка) is a rural locality (a village) in Surensky Selsoviet, Zianchurinsky District, Bashkortostan, Russia. The population was 29 as of 2010. There is 1 street.

== Geography ==
Bogdanovka is located 18 km southeast of Isyangulovo (the district's administrative centre) by road. Maly Muynak is the nearest rural locality.
