= Maloye Baydavletovo =

Maloye Baydavletovo Малое Байдавлетово
- Village
- Location within Bashkortostan Location within Russia
- Coordinates: 52°06′N 56°39′E
- Country: Russia
- Region: Bashkortostan
- District: Zianchurinsky District
- Time zone: UTC+5:00

Maloye Baydavletovo (Russian: Малое Байдавлетово; Bashkir: Кесе Байдәүләт, Kese Baydäwlät) is a rural locality (a village) in Tazlarovsky Selsoviet, Zianchurinsky District, Bashkortostan, Russia. The population was 15 as of 2010. There is 1 street.

== Geography ==
Maloye Baydavletovo is located 17 km southeast of Isyangulovo (the district's administrative centre) by road. Nizhny Sarabil is the nearest rural locality.
