= Trushino =

Trushino Трушино
- Village
- Location within Bashkortostan Location within Russia
- Coordinates: 52°13′N 56°44′E
- Country: Russia
- Region: Bashkortostan
- District: Zianchurinsky District
- Time zone: UTC+5:00

Trushino (Russian: Трушино) is a rural locality (a village) and the administrative centre of Bikbausky Selsoviet, Zianchurinsky District, Bashkortostan, Russia. The population was 221 as of 2010. There are 4 streets.

== Geography ==
Trushino is located 19 km northeast of Isyangulovo (the district's administrative centre) by road. Karadygan is the nearest rural locality.
