= Nizhny Sarabil =

Nizhny Sarabil Нижний Сарабиль
- Village
- Location within Bashkortostan Location within Russia
- Coordinates: 52°06′N 56°38′E
- Country: Russia
- Region: Bashkortostan
- District: Zianchurinsky District
- Time zone: UTC+5:00

Nizhny Sarabil (Russian: Нижний Сарабиль; Bashkir: Түбәнге Һарыбил, Tübänge Harıbil) is a rural locality (a village) in Tazlarovsky Selsoviet, Zianchurinsky District, Bashkortostan, Russia. The population was 96 as of 2010. There is 1 street.

== Geography ==
Nizhny Sarabil is located 15 km southeast of Isyangulovo (the district's administrative centre) by road. Maloye Baydavletovo is the nearest rural locality.
