= Kugarchi =

Kugarchi Кугарчи
- Selo
- Location within Bashkortostan Location within Russia
- Coordinates: 52°08′N 56°49′E
- Country: Russia
- Region: Bashkortostan
- District: Zianchurinsky District
- Time zone: UTC+5:00

Kugarchi (Russian: Кугарчи; Bashkir: Күгәрсен, Kügärsen) is a rural locality (a selo) and the administrative centre of Surensky Selsoviet, Zianchurinsky District, Bashkortostan, Russia. The population was 856 as of 2010. There are 8 streets.

== Geography ==
Kugarchi is located 22 km southeast of Isyangulovo (the district's administrative centre) by road. Kinzyabulatovo is the nearest rural locality.
