= Georgiyevsky, Republic of Bashkortostan =

Georgiyevsky Георгиевский
- Khutor
- Location within Bashkortostan Location within Russia
- Coordinates: 51°37′16.5″N 57°15′25.1″E
- Country: Russia
- Region: Bashkortostan
- District: Zianchurinsky District
- Time zone: UTC+5:00

Georgiyevsky (Russian: Георгиевский) is a rural locality (a khutor) in Yanybayevsky Selsoviet, Zianchurinsky District, Bashkortostan, Russia. The population was 3 as of 2010. There is 1 street.

== Geography ==
Georgiyevsky is located 150 km southeast of Isyangulovo (the district's administrative centre) by road. Kuzhanak is the nearest rural locality.
