= Baydavletovo =

Baydavletovo Байдавлетово
- Selo
- Location within Bashkortostan Location within Russia
- Coordinates: 52°12′N 56°53′E
- Country: Russia
- Region: Bashkortostan
- District: Zianchurinsky District
- Time zone: UTC+5:00

Baydavletovo (Russian: Байдавлетово; Bashkir: Байдәүләт, Baydäwlät) is a rural locality (a selo) in Baydavletovsky Selsoviet, Zianchurinsky District, Bashkortostan, Russia. The population was 207 as of 2010. There is 1 street.

== Geography ==
Baydavletovo is located 30 km east of Isyangulovo (the district's administrative centre) by road. Suleymanovo is the nearest rural locality.
