= Itkulovo =

Itkulovo Иткулово
- Village
- Location within Bashkortostan Location within Russia
- Coordinates: 51°52′N 56°50′E
- Country: Russia
- Region: Bashkortostan
- District: Zianchurinsky District
- Time zone: UTC+5:00

Itkulovo (Russian: Иткулово; Bashkir: Этҡол, Etqol) is a rural locality (a village) in Abzanovsky Selsoviet, Zianchurinsky District, Bashkortostan, Russia. The population was 383 as of 2010. There are 6 streets.

== Geography ==
Itkulovo is located 52 km southeast of Isyangulovo (the district's administrative centre) by road. Abzanovo is the nearest rural locality.
