= Novokasmartsky =

Novokasmartsky Новокасмартский
- Village
- Location within Bashkortostan Location within Russia
- Coordinates: 51°46′N 57°06′E
- Country: Russia
- Region: Bashkortostan
- District: Zianchurinsky District
- Time zone: UTC+5:00

Novokasmartsky (Russian: Новокасмартский; Bashkir: Яңы Ҡаҫмарт, Yañı Qaśmart) is a rural locality (a village) in Baishevsky Selsoviet, Zianchurinsky District, Bashkortostan, Russia. The population was 6 as of 2010. There is 1 street.

== Geography ==
Novokasmartsky is located 86 km southeast of Isyangulovo (the district's administrative centre) by road. Idelbakovo is the nearest rural locality.
