= Ilmalya =

Ilmalya Ильмаля
- Village
- Location within Bashkortostan Location within Russia
- Coordinates: 51°52′N 57°06′E
- Country: Russia
- Region: Bashkortostan
- District: Zianchurinsky District
- Time zone: UTC+5:00

Ilmalya (Russian: Ильмаля; Bashkir: Элмәле, Elmäle) is a rural locality (a village) in Baishevsky Selsoviet, Zianchurinsky District, Bashkortostan, Russia. The population was 205 as of 2010. There are 3 streets.

== Geography ==
Ilmalya is located 96 km southeast of Isyangulovo (the district's administrative centre) by road. Baishevo is the nearest rural locality.
