= Sredny Muynak =

Sredny Muynak Средний Муйнак
- Village
- Location within Bashkortostan Location within Russia
- Coordinates: 52°01′N 56°44′E
- Country: Russia
- Region: Bashkortostan
- District: Zianchurinsky District
- Time zone: UTC+5:00

Sredny Muynak (Russian: Средний Муйнак; Bashkir: Урта Муйнаҡ, Urta Muynaq) is a rural locality (a village) in Muynaksky Selsoviet, Zianchurinsky District, Bashkortostan, Russia. The population was 176 as of 2010. There are 2 streets.

== Geography ==
Sredny Muynak is located 26 km southeast of Isyangulovo (the district's administrative centre) by road. Verkhny Muynak is the nearest rural locality.
