= Verkhny Sarabil =

Verkhny Sarabil Верхний Сарабиль
- Village
- Location within Bashkortostan Location within Russia
- Coordinates: 52°07′N 56°42′E
- Country: Russia
- Region: Bashkortostan
- District: Zianchurinsky District
- Time zone: UTC+5:00

Verkhny Sarabil (Russian: Верхний Сарабиль; Bashkir: Үрге Һарыбил, Ürge Harıbil) is a rural locality (a village) in Tazlarovsky Selsoviet, Zianchurinsky District, Bashkortostan, Russia. The population was 22 as of 2010. There is 1 street.

== Geography ==
Verkhny Sarabil is located 16 km southeast of Isyangulovo (the district's administrative centre) by road. Maly Muynak is the nearest rural locality.
