= Karadygan =

Karadygan Карадыган
- Village
- Location within Bashkortostan Location within Russia
- Coordinates: 52°11′N 56°43′E
- Country: Russia
- Region: Bashkortostan
- District: Zianchurinsky District
- Time zone: UTC+5:00

Karadygan (Russian: Карадыган; Bashkir: Ҡарадигән, Qaradigän) is a rural locality (a village) in Bikbausky Selsoviet, Zianchurinsky District, Bashkortostan, Russia. The population was 20 as of 2010. There are 2 streets.

== Geography ==
Karadygan is located 14 km east of Isyangulovo (the district's administrative centre) by road. Bikbau is the nearest rural locality.
