= Abzanovo, Zianchurinsky District, Bashkortostan =

Abzanovo Абзаново Абҙан
- Selo
- Location within Bashkortostan Location within Russia
- Coordinates: 51°51′N 56°45′E
- Country: Russia
- Region: Bashkortostan
- District: Zianchurinsky District
- Time zone: [[UTC+5:00]]

Abzanovo (Russian: Абзаново, Bashkir: Абҙан, Abźan) is a rural locality (a selo) and the administrative centre of Abzanovsky Selsoviet, Zianchurinsky District, Bashkortostan, Russia. The population was 882 as of 2010. There are 14 streets.

== Geography ==
Abzanovo is located 48 km south of Isyangulovo (the district's administrative centre) by road. Niyazgulovo is the nearest rural locality.

== Ethnicity ==
The village is inhabited by Bashkirs and others.
