= Nazarovo, Zianchurinsky District, Republic of Bashkortostan =

Nazarovo Назарово
- Village
- Location within Bashkortostan Location within Russia
- Coordinates: 52°15′N 56°26′E
- Country: Russia
- Region: Bashkortostan
- District: Zianchurinsky District
- Time zone: UTC+5:00

Nazarovo (Russian: Назарово; Bashkir: Назар, Nazar) is a rural locality (a village) in Novochebenkinsky Selsoviet, Zianchurinsky District, Bashkortostan, Russia. The population was 69 as of 2010. There are 2 streets.

== Geography ==
Nazarovo is located 31 km northwest of Isyangulovo (the district's administrative centre) by road. Novonikolayevka is the nearest rural locality.
