= Nizhneye Mambetshino =

Nizhneye Mambetshino Нижнее Мамбетшино
- Village
- Location within Bashkortostan Location within Russia
- Coordinates: 51°37′N 57°11′E
- Country: Russia
- Region: Bashkortostan
- District: Zianchurinsky District
- Time zone: UTC+5:00

Nizhneye Mambetshino (Russian: Нижнее Мамбетшино; Bashkir: Түбәнге Мәмбәтша, Tübänge Mämbätşa) is a rural locality (a village) in Yanybayevsky Selsoviet, Zianchurinsky District, Bashkortostan, Russia. The population was 75 as of 2010. There are 2 streets.

== Geography ==
Nizhneye Mambetshino is located 148 km southeast of Isyangulovo (the district's administrative centre) by road. Kyzylyarovo is the nearest rural locality.
