= Victoria Angelova =

Bulgarian architect (1902–1947)

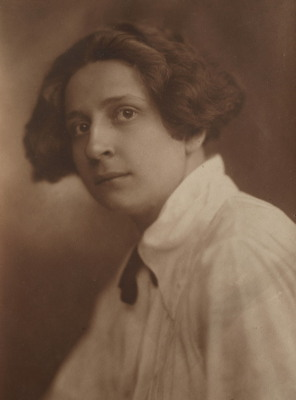
- Viktoria Vinarova, ca. 1920
- Born: Bulgarian: Виктория Ангелова; 20 November 1902; Veliko Tarnovo, Bulgaria
- Died: 27 December 1947 (aged 45); Sofia, Bulgaria
- Other names: Victoria Angelova Vinarov
- Occupation: architect
- Years active: 1926-1947
- Spouse: Boris Vinarov (married in 1933)

Victoria Angelova Vinarova (sometimes written Viktoria Angelova, Bulgarian: Виктория Ангелова-Винарова, 1902–1947) was one of the first female architects of Bulgaria. She is credited with having built the first modern, national art gallery in the Balkans.

== Biography ==
Victoria Angelova was born on 20 November 1902 in Veliko Tarnovo, Bulgaria to Vasil Angelov, a merchant who had been educated in England. He named his daughter after Queen Victoria in homage. She graduated from the Vienna University of Technology and the Dresden Polytechnic in 1924, seven years after Maria Luisa Doseva-Georgieva earned her license. At the age of 24, she returned to Sofia and was working as an intern at the Ministry of Public Works when she won a contest for her first major commission. In 1933, Angelova married a fellow architect, Boris Vinarov and they set up a practice in Sofia.

Angelova worked during a period when most public projects were awarded after competitions which were open nationally. She designed buildings throughout the country, but is primarily known for those in Sofia. She was awarded the Order of Civil Merit for her architectural contributions to the country. In 1944, the couple's home was bombed and they lost many of their personal effects, including their architectural drawings. They evacuated to Turnovo, where Angelova became ill with a severe case of pneumonia. Believing she had recovered, they returned to Sofia in 1946, but Angelova relapsed and died on 27 December 1947. Her husband died three months later.

== Selected projects ==
=== Ministry of Public Buildings, Roads and Public Works ===
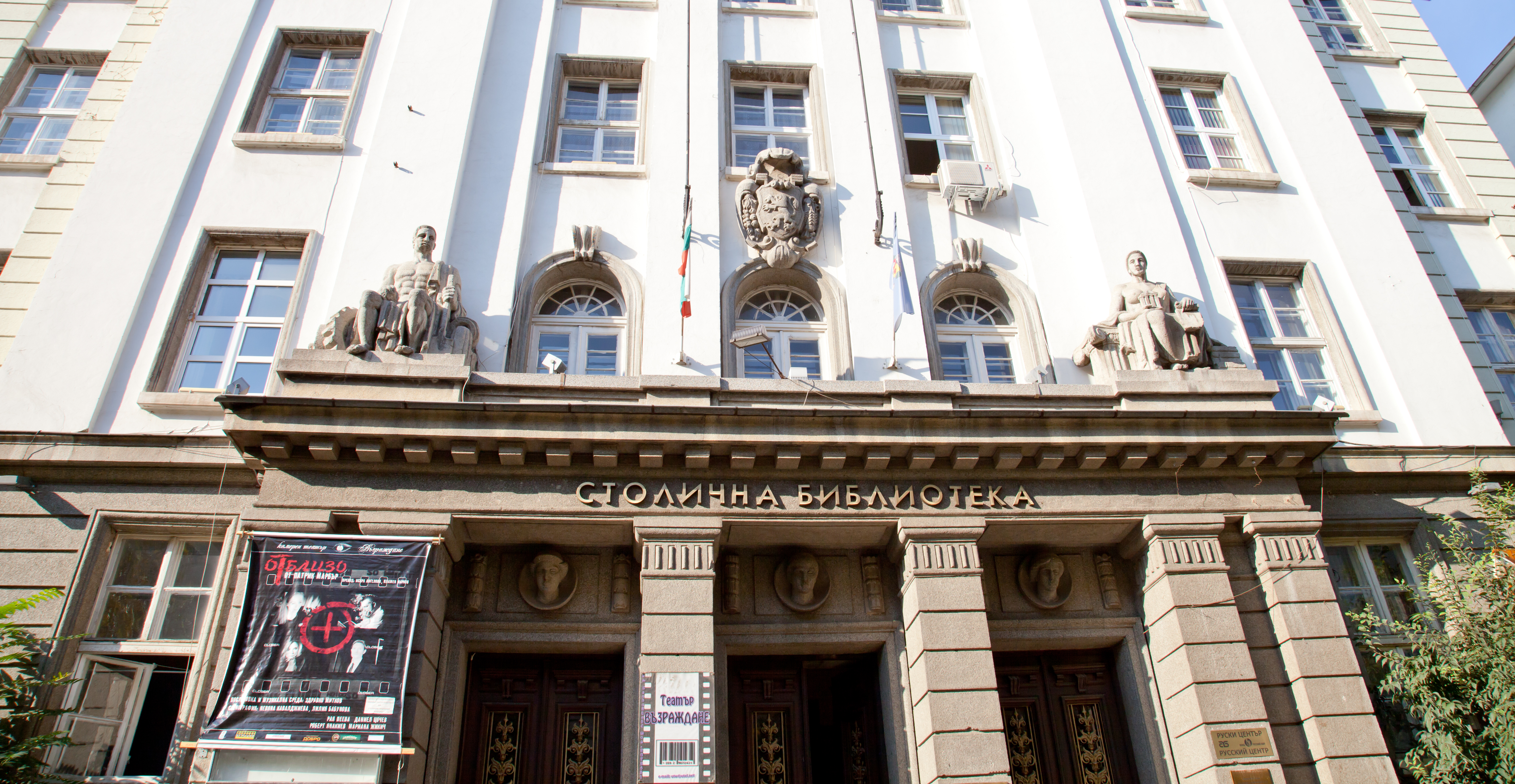
Ministry of Public Works, now the Metropolitan Library, ca. 2012

The ministry held a contest in 1926 for designs of a new office building for the Ministry of Public Buildings, Roads and Public Works. Although Angelova won the contest, she was required to have the experienced architects Georgi Ovcharov and Yordan Yordanov (Bulgarian: Йордан Йорданов) oversee her work. The building covered an entire city block known as "Slaveykov Square" and was bounded by "GS Rakovski", "William Gladstone" and "Han Krum " streets. Construction began in 1928 and was completed four years later.

The design was Neoclassical and featured towering marble columns and mosaic floor tiles. Flanking the entrance were two statues, one female figure representing architecture and one male figure representing construction, as well as three stone heads in altorilievo adorning the doorways. The sculptures were completed by Mikhail Ivanov, Stephen Peychev and Cyril Shivarov. The wide corridors and high ceilings are offset by stained glass designed by Haralampy Tachev and made in Munich by F. Seiler. Today it houses the Metropolitan Library and the "Renaissance Theater" on one side and several doctors' and dentists' offices on the other.

=== National Art Gallery ===
From 1934 to 1941, Angelova worked on the National Art Gallery. The building was completed in 1942 and opened featuring a first floor which housed Renaissance paintings by Stanislav Dospevski, Nikolai Pavlovich, Hristo Tsokev, Zahari Zograf, as well as handcrafts from regions noted for folk artworks, such as Tryavna, Samokov and others. The second floor focused on contemporary Bulgarian art featuring painters and sculptors from the early 20th century. When completed, the building was recognized as the first modern, national art gallery in the Balkans. It was bombed in 1944 and completely destroyed, along with its contents, which included the complete works of leading Bulgarian sculptor Alexander Andreev Berhatliev

=== Sea Casino of Burgas ===
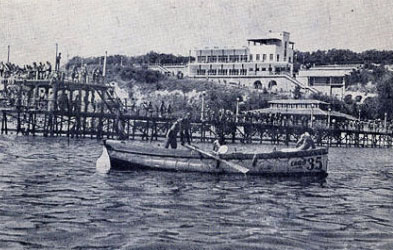
Sea Casino, Burgas

In 1936, Atanas Sirekov, the mayor of Burgas, initiated a design contest for a casino on Burgas Bay. Seventeen architects competed and Angelova won with a design she called "333". The building required a complex design due to the steep slope of the site and its panoramic view of the entire gulf area. Completed in 1938, the inauguration was attended by dignitaries from throughout the country, who received a special travel discount of 70% off the price of train tickets to attend. The building was abandoned in the late 1990s, but after almost 20 years of neglect, was restored and opened as a cultural center in 2011. The renovation project won the “Building of the Year” award for 2011.

=== Raduntsi Lung Hospital ===
In 1937 after a lengthy study had taken place, an act was passed for the construction of a tubercular sanatorium in the village of Raduntsi. The Pulmonary Hospital was to be the largest facility of its kind in the Balkans and located 650 meters above sea level. Angelova won the contract for the construction of the hospital and building was to begin shortly before World War II started. Ground was broken in 1939, but in 1940 after four stories were built, further construction was suspended until after the war ended. Construction resumed on 9 September 1944 but was not completed until 1955, nearly a decade after Angelova's death. The first patients were received at the hospital on 1 November 1955. Financial problems which began in 2013, forced the closure of the hospital in 2015.

== Works ==
- 1926 Bulgarian Lawyers Association Building
- 1927-1936 Museum of Natural History, which was destroyed during the bombing of 1944 and rebuilt between 1947 and 1948.
- 1928-1932 Ministry of Public Buildings, Roads and Public Works, Sofia
- 1929 Provincial Office Building, Kardzhali, joint project with Čavdar Mutafov
- 1930 Post Office in Burgas, for which her design won second prize in competition.
- 1930 General Directorate of State Railways, for which her design won fourth prize in competition.
- 1931 Military Club in Pleven, for which her design won third prize in competition.
- 1933 "Metropolitan Kliment" Girls 'School in Veliko Tarnovo
- 1934-1941 National Art Gallery, destroyed in the 1944 bombings
- 1935 Post Office in Plovdiv, for which her design won second prize in competition.
- 1936-1938 Sea Casino of Burgos
- 1936 Clinic for Skin and Venereal Diseases at the Medical Academy and the second surgery of the Alexander Hospital. The north wing of the hospital was destroyed in a direct hit on 10 January 1944 with damage to all other parts of the hospital, which at the time was the largest in Bulgaria.
- 1937-1939 Girls' High School of Taksim, in Plovdiv, which is now the Academy of Music
- 1939-1955 The Raduntsi Lung Hospital
- "Father Paisii" Mathematics High School at #61 Iskar Street, Sofia
- "Vasil Drumev" Mathematics School in Veliko Tarnovo

== Photo gallery ==
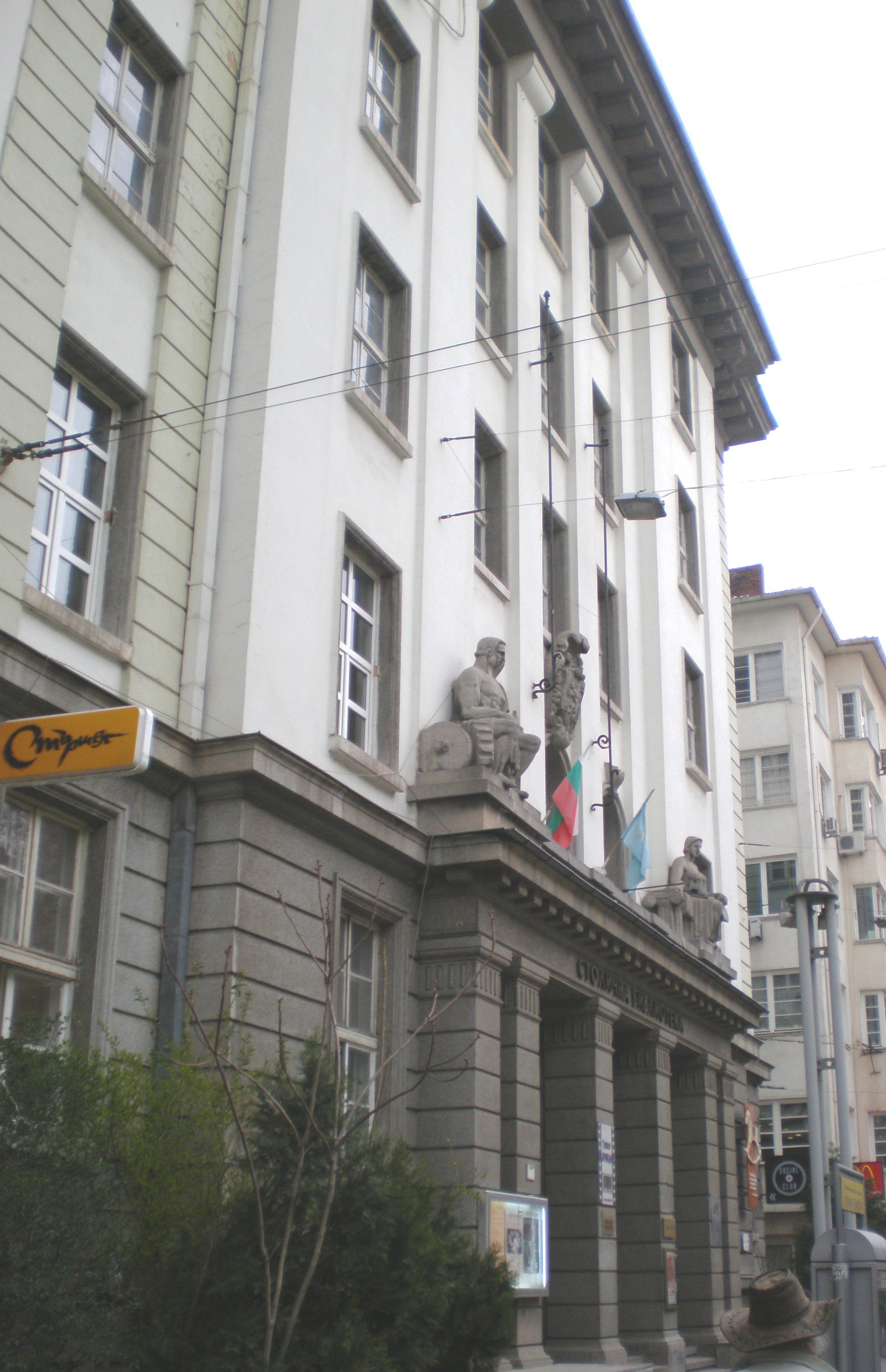
Metropolitan Library (formerly the Ministry of Public Works)

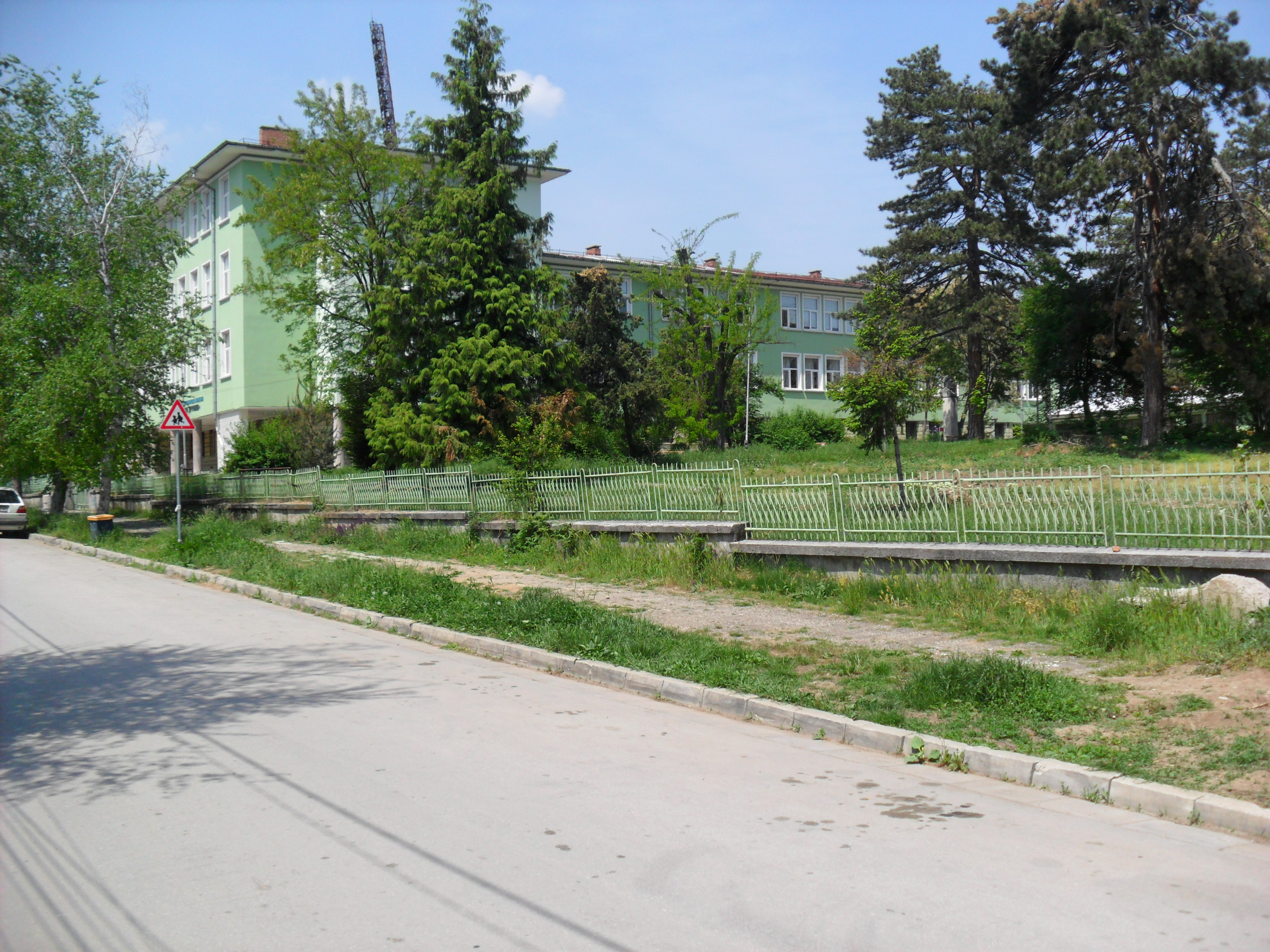
Vasil Drumev School of Natural Sciences and Math, Veliko Tarnovo
