= Georgiyevsky =

Georgiyevsky (masculine), Georgiyevskaya (feminine), or Georgiyevskoye (neuter) may refer to:

- Yevlogy Georgiyevsky (1868–1946), metropolitan of the Russian Orthodox Church
- Georgiyevsky District, a district of Stavropol Krai, Russia
- Georgiyevsky Municipal Okrug, a municipal okrug of Frunzensky District of Saint Petersburg, Russia
- Georgiyevsky (rural locality) (Georgiyevskaya, Georgiyevskoye), name of several rural localities in Russia
