= Georgiyevskaya, Vologda Oblast =

Georgiyevskaya Георгиевская
- Village
- Location within Vologda Oblast Location within Russia
- Coordinates: 60°00′N 41°34′E
- Country: Russia
- Region: Vologda Oblast
- District: Syamzhensky District
- Time zone: UTC+3:00

Georgiyevskaya (Russian: Георгиевская) is a rural locality (a village) and the administrative center of Korobitsynskoye Rural Settlement, Syamzhensky District, Vologda Oblast, Russia. The population was 212 as of 2002. There are 8 streets.

== Geography ==
Georgiyevskaya is located 38 km east of Syamzha (the district's administrative centre) by road. Martyanikha is the nearest rural locality.
