= Georgiyevskoye, Sokolsky District, Vologda Oblast =

Georgiyevskoye Георгиевское
- Selo
- Location within Vologda Oblast Location within Russia
- Coordinates: 59°36′N 40°50′E
- Country: Russia
- Region: Vologda Oblast
- District: Sokolsky District
- Time zone: UTC+3:00

Georgiyevskoye (Russian: Георгиевское) is a rural locality (a selo) in Vorobyovskoye Rural Settlement, Sokolsky District, Vologda Oblast, Russia. The population was 1 as of 2002.

== Geography ==
Georgiyevskoye is located 74 km northeast of Sokol (the district's administrative centre) by road. Titovskoye is the nearest rural locality.
