= Georgiyevskoye, Republic of Buryatia =

Georgiyevskoye Георгиевское
- Selo
- Location within Republic of Buryatia Location within Russia
- Coordinates: 52°20′N 110°27′E
- Country: Russia
- Region: Republic of Buryatia
- District: Khorinsky District
- Time zone: UTC+8:00

Georgiyevskoye (Russian: Георгиевское) is a rural locality (a selo) in Khorinsky District, Republic of Buryatia, Russia. The population was 579 as of 2010. There are 13 streets.

== Geography ==
Georgiyevskoye is located 55 km northeast of Khorinsk (the district's administrative centre) by road. Amgalanta is the nearest rural locality.
