= Nazarovo, Sobinsky District, Vladimir Oblast =

Nazarovo Назарово
- Village
- Location within Vladimir Oblast Location within Russia
- Coordinates: 56°06′N 40°09′E
- Country: Russia
- Region: Vladimir Oblast
- District: Sobinsky District
- Time zone: UTC+3:00

Nazarovo (Russian: Назарово) is a rural locality (a village) in Vorshinskoye Rural Settlement, Sobinsky District, Vladimir Oblast, Russia. The population was 10 as of 2010.

== Geography ==
Nazarovo is located 30 km northeast of Sobinka (the district's administrative centre) by road. Batyushkovo is the nearest rural locality.
