= Penka Georgieva =

Mathematician

Penka Vasileva Georgieva is a mathematician whose research interests include enumerative geometry, symplectic topology, and Gromov–Witten invariants. Educated in Bulgaria and the US, she works in France as a professor at the Institut de mathématiques de Jussieu – Paris Rive Gauche, affiliated with Sorbonne University.

== Education and career ==
Georgieva was a student of Vasil Tsanov in Bulgaria, earning a master's degree in 2005 with the master's thesis Quotients of the Ball of the Second Kind. She went to Stanford University for doctoral study with Eleny Ionel, and defended her dissertation, Orientability of moduli spaces and open Gromov-Witten invariants, in 2011. She completed a habilitation in 2020.

After working as an instructor at Princeton University from 2011 to 2014, she came to the Institut de mathématiques de Jussieu as a postdoctoral researcher in 2014, and continued as maître de conférences in 2016. She was named as a professor there in 2021.

== Recognition ==
Georgieva was an invited speaker at the 2022 (virtual) International Congress of Mathematicians.

She received the CNRS Bronze Medal in 2022.
