= Nazarovo, Sheksninsky District, Vologda Oblast =

Nazarovo Назарово
- Village
- Location within Vologda Oblast Location within Russia
- Coordinates: 59°21′N 38°41′E
- Country: Russia
- Region: Vologda Oblast
- District: Sheksninsky District
- Time zone: UTC+3:00

Nazarovo (Russian: Назарово) is a rural locality (a village) in Sizemskoye Rural Settlement, Sheksninsky District, Vologda Oblast, Russia. The population was 13 as of 2002.

== Geography ==
Nazarovo is located 25 km northeast of Sheksna (the district's administrative centre) by road. Stupnovo is the nearest rural locality.
