= Viliana Georgieva =

Viliana Valentinova Georgieva (Bulgarian: Вилияна Валентинова Георгиева) (born 20 September 1982), better known as Viliana, is a Bulgarian TV show host and model for designers. She has been featured on a dozen magazine covers.

Viliana runs an advertising business. She was one of the faces of Manhattan Cosmetics and ItalGold, and has been featured in a Florina advertising campaign.

After one magazine cover appearance, Viliana was the host of an episode of the TV show 5 Minutes in Hollywood.

== Magazine covers ==
- Viliana Georgieva, Журнал за Жената (Women Journal), Vol. 12/2009, cover page, Cross Press, Sofia;
- Viliana Georgiev, Бела (Bella), vol. 139 9/2009, cover page, BELA MAGAZINE, Daks Press, Sofia;
- Viliana Georgieva, 'Models Academy', Ревю, vol. 3/2000, cover page; Review Magazine, Sofia;
- Viliana Georgieva, Ревю, vol. 19/2001, cover page; Review Magazine, Sofia;
- Viliana Georgieva, 24 tele Импулса (24 TeleImpulse), vol. 3/2000. cover page; Sofia
- Viliana Georgieva, Go Guide, vol. august/2009, cover page; Go Guide, Sofia—Tsvetozarv 14:11, 2 July 2012 (UTC)
- Viliana Georgieva, Coiffure Beauty, vol. April/ 2014, cover page; interview p. 16-p. 20
