= Georgiyevskoye, Kineshemsky District, Ivanovo Oblast =

Georgiyevskoye Георгиевское
- Village
- Location within Ivanovo Oblast Location within Russia
- Coordinates: 57°25′N 42°46′E
- Country: Russia
- Region: Ivanovo Oblast
- District: Kineshemsky District
- Time zone: UTC+3:00

Georgiyevskoye (Russian: Георгиевское) is a rural locality (a selo) in Kineshemsky District, Ivanovo Oblast, Russia. Population: 10 (2010 census);

== Geography ==
This rural locality is located 39 kilometres (24 mi) from Kineshma (the district's administrative centre), 119 kilometres (74 mi) from Ivanovo (capital of Ivanovo Oblast) and 361 kilometres (224 mi) from Moscow. Valy is the nearest rural locality.
