= Nazarovo, Baymaksky District, Republic of Bashkortostan =

Nazarovo Назарово
- Village
- Location within Bashkortostan Location within Russia
- Coordinates: 52°50′N 58°25′E
- Country: Russia
- Region: Bashkortostan
- District: Baymaksky District
- Time zone: UTC+5:00

Nazarovo (Russian: Назарово; Bashkir: Наҙар, Naźar) is a rural locality (a village) in Mukasovsky Selsoviet, Baymaksky District, Bashkortostan, Russia. The population was 3 as of 2010. There are 2 streets.

== Geography ==
Nazarovo is located 63 km north of Baymak (the district's administrative centre) by road. Abzakovo is the nearest rural locality.
