= Vladimir Georgievski (artist) =

Macedonian painter (1942–2017)

Vladimir Georgievski (Macedonian: Владимир Георгиевски; 1 June 1942 – 25 May 2017) was a Macedonian painter and a professor at the University of Sts. Cyril and Methodius and the University for Audiovisual Arts in Skopje.

== Early life and education ==
Vladimir Georgievski was born during World War II, on 1 June 1943 in Skopje, in the Axis-occupied Kingdom of Yugoslavia.

He graduated from the secondary School for Arts and Design in Skopje in 1963. The same year he enrolled at the Arts Academy in Belgrade, SFR Yugoslavia, from which he graduated in 1968. He attained his post-graduate degree in painting at the same Academy under the mentorship of professor Mladen Srbinović in 1970. He then returned to Skopje, where he continued to paint and run the Arts Section of the Youth Cultural Center

== Career ==
Between 1980 and 2017 he was a professor of painting, sculpting, art history, and theatre set and costume design at the University of Sts. Cyril and Methodius and the University for Audiovisual Arts in Skopje.

In parallel with teaching, Georgievski continued to create art. His paintings, drawings, sculptures and bas-reliefs were exhibited in solo exhibitions in Skopje, Belgrade, Istanbul, Vienna, Rome, Kiev, Sofia and St. Petersburg. He was a member of the Artists' Association of Macedonia (DLUM) and took part in many of their group exhibitions

In 2012 he was awarded the highest state recognition for life achievement in art by the Government of the Republic of Macedonia. The Caricature and Drawings Association (OSTEN) awarded him with a lifetime achievement prize in 2014. The University for Audiovisual Arts in Skopje awarded him the title Doctor Honoris Causa in 2017.

Georgievski produced fifty seven stage and costume designs for theatre plays and feature films in Macedonia and the cities of former Yugoslavia, some of which were awarded prizes. His works adorn the walls of the Macedonian Opera and Ballet, the Music Academy and of several state institutions in Skopje, as well as Dostoyevski's Memorial House in St. Petersburg, Russia.

He died in Skopje, North Macedonia, on 25 May 2017.
