= Nazarovo, Kameshkovsky District, Vladimir Oblast =

Nazarovo Назарово
- Village
- Location within Vladimir Oblast Location within Russia
- Coordinates: 56°25′N 41°06′E
- Country: Russia
- Region: Vladimir Oblast
- District: Kameshkovsky District
- Time zone: UTC+3:00

Nazarovo (Russian: Назарово) is a rural locality (a village) in Bryzgalovskoye Rural Settlement, Kameshkovsky District, Vladimir Oblast, Russia. The population was 56 as of 2010.

== Geography ==
Nazarovo is located 14 km northeast of Kameshkovo (the district's administrative centre) by road. Bryzgalovo is the nearest rural locality.
