= Georgiyevskoye, Privolzhsky District, Ivanovo Oblast =

Georgiyevskoye Георгиевское
- Village
- Location within Ivanovo Oblast Location within Russia
- Coordinates: 57°23′N 41°21′E
- Country: Russia
- Region: Ivanovo Oblast
- District: Privolzhsky District
- Time zone: UTC+3:00

Georgiyevskoye (Russian: Георгиевское) is a rural locality (a selo) in Privolzhsky District, Ivanovo Oblast, Russia. Population: 30 (2010 census);

== Geography ==
This rural locality is located 4 kilometres (2.5 mi) from Privolzhsk (the district's administrative centre), 50 kilometres (31 mi) from Ivanovo (the capital of Ivanovo Oblast) and 288 kilometres (179 mi) from Moscow. Gorki is the nearest rural locality.
