= Nazarovo, Petushinsky District, Vladimir Oblast =

Nazarovo Назарово
- Village
- Location within Vladimir Oblast Location within Russia
- Coordinates: 56°07′N 39°28′E
- Country: Russia
- Region: Vladimir Oblast
- District: Petushinsky District
- Time zone: UTC+3:00

Nazarovo (Russian: Назарово) is a rural locality (a village) in Pekshinskoye Rural Settlement, Petushinsky District, Vladimir Oblast, Russia. The population was 2 as of 2010.

== Geography ==
Nazarovo is located 31 km north of Petushki (the district's administrative centre) by road. Kuzyayevo is the nearest rural locality.
