= Nazarovo, Perm Krai =

Nazarovo Назарово
- Village
- Location within Perm Krai Location within Russia
- Coordinates: 57°49′N 56°42′E
- Country: Russia
- Region: Perm Krai
- District: Permsky District
- Time zone: UTC+5:00

Nazarovo (Russian: Назарово) is a rural locality (a village) in Dvurechenskoye Rural Settlement, Permsky District, Perm Krai, Russia. The population was 1 as of 2010. There are 3 streets.

== Geography ==
Nazarovo is located 46 km southeast of Perm (the district's administrative centre) by road. Mostovaya is the nearest rural locality.
