= Maria Luisa Doseva-Georgieva =

- Мария-Луиза Досева-Георгиева
- Born: Maria Luisa Doseva; 8 September 1894; Targovishte, Bulgaria
- Died: 11 April 1975 (aged 80); Burgas, People's Republic of Bulgaria
- Occupations: architect, women's rights activist
- Years active: 1917–1973

Maria Luisa Doseva-Georgieva (Bulgarian: Мария-Луиза Досева-Георгиева; 8 September 1894 – 11 April 1975) was one of the first two women licensed as an architect in Bulgaria. She built many well-known sites in the city of Burgas, including the Boulevard Hotel, the residence of Georgi Popayanov, many commercial buildings, as well as schools. In 1968, she was awarded a gold badge and made an honorary member of the Union of Bulgarian Architects.

== Early life ==
Maria Luisa Doseva was born on 8 September 1894 in Targovishte, Bulgaria to Konstantin Dosev, a banker and merchant who served in the National Assembly for several terms. She completed her primary and lower secondary education in Targovishte, before entering high school in Veliko Tarnovo. Upon her graduation from high school, in Varna, she received recognition from the Ministry of Education. Though architecture was considered a male occupation in her era, Doseva moved to Germany in 1913 to enroll at the Technical University of Munich, but was refused admittance based on her gender.

Intent on studying architecture, she applied to the Technical University of Darmstadt and was accepted for the 1913 term. After completing her first year studies, Doseva returned to Bulgaria to complete her practice internship and requested work in southern Bulgaria, where there was a building boom caused by the large number of refugees who had settled around Haskovo after the Balkan Wars. She graduated on 20 December 1917, with an architectural degree, a few weeks after Elena Markova (Bulgarian: Елена Маркова), a fellow student in Darmstadt, who was from Sophia, and was awarded authorization to work as an architect from the Ministry of Public Buildings, Roads and Public Works.

For a brief time after her graduation, Doseva returned to Targovishte, where she married Minko Georgiev, an architecture student she had met in Darmstadt on 5 January 1918.

== Career ==
The couple soon moved to Stara Zagora, Georgiev's home town, where their son, Georgi, was born. Because of a lack of work there, the family moved to Burgas, where Georgiev was appointed as a state architect. Doseva-Georgieva opened an office in their home at 25 Ferdinandova Street in 1920 and was hired to design a house in September of the same year. As her reputation grew, she worked on commercial buildings as well as residential properties in Burgas and the eastern cities of Sliven, Varna and Yambol. Their family also expanded as two daughters, Liliana and Milka were born.

In addition to her architectural work, Doseva-Georgieva was active in women's social improvement projects. She co-founded the first kindergarten in Burgas, as well as a tailoring school to train girls in the profession. She was involved in the charitable organization "Mercy" (Bulgarian: Милосърдие) and actively worked on projects through the Independent Women's Association "Self-consciousness" (Bulgarian: Независимо женско дружество „Самосъзнание”) to improve civic and social access and protect the rights of women and children.

Doseva-Georgieva designed emblematic buildings incorporating an eclectic mix of European and Arabic influences. Between 1920 and 1921, she designed the Boulevard Hotel in Burgas, near the railway station on Alexandrovska Street (later renamed Czechoslvakia Street). The building incorporated elements of the German secessionist movement with geometric forms and ornamentation of Islamic origin.

In 1923, she designed the home of the merchant, Peter Kiulyumov (sometimes styled as Chulumov) (Bulgarian: Петър Чюлюмови/Кюлюмови) at #18 Prince Alexander Batenberg Street, which was followed by a residence for Georgi Popayanov on the corner of Aleko Bogoridi Boulevard and Mihail Lermontov Street, as well as homes for other prominent citizens.

Appointed as a project architect for schools, she designed educational facilities for Izvor, Kableshkovo, Kameno, Primorsko, Ravna Gora, Rusokastro, Sredets and Troyanovo, as well as other small towns and villages.

After her husband died in 1947, Doseva-Georgieva was appointed as overseer and controller of the regional design organization in Burgas. In 1968, she was presented with the golden badge of the Union of Bulgarian Architects and installed as an honorary member of the organization. She worked as an architect until 1973, when she retired.

== Death and legacy ==
Doseva-Georgieva died on 11 April 1975 in Burgas. She is remembered as the first woman to practice architecture in Bulgaria, as though she was not the first to be licensed, Elena Markova, did not work in the field after she received her license and married. The former Boulevard Hotel has been restored and is an icon in the central district of Burgas.
