= Isyangulovo =

Isyangulovo Исянгулово
- Selo

Other transcription(s)
  - Bashkir: Иҫәнғол
- Interactive map of Isyangulovo
- Location of Isyangulovo Isyangulovo (Bashkortostan)
- Coordinates: 52°11′33″N 56°34′49″E
- Country: Russia
- Federal subject: Bashkortostan
- Administrative district: Zianchurinsky District
- Founded: 1802

Government
  - Leader: Sabirov Timur

Population (2010 Census)
  - Total: 7,418
  - Estimate (14 October 2010): 7,418 (0%)

Administrative status
  - Capital of: Zianchurinsky District
- Time zone: UTC+5 (MSK+2)
- Postal code: 453380
- OKTMO ID: 80626416101

Isyangulovo population
- 2010 Census: 7,418
- 2002 Census: 7,441
- 1989 Census: 6,017
- 1979 Census: 6,278

Isyangulovo (Russian: Исянгу́лово; Bashkir: Иҫәнғол, İśänğol) is a rural locality (a selo) and the administrative center of Zianchurinsky District in the Republic of Bashkortostan, Russia. As of the 2010 Census, its population was 7,418.

The head of Isyangulovo village is Timur Sabirov.
