= Zianchurinsky District =

Zianchurinsky District Зианчуринский район (Russian)
- District

Other transcription(s)
  - Bashkir: Ейәнсура районы
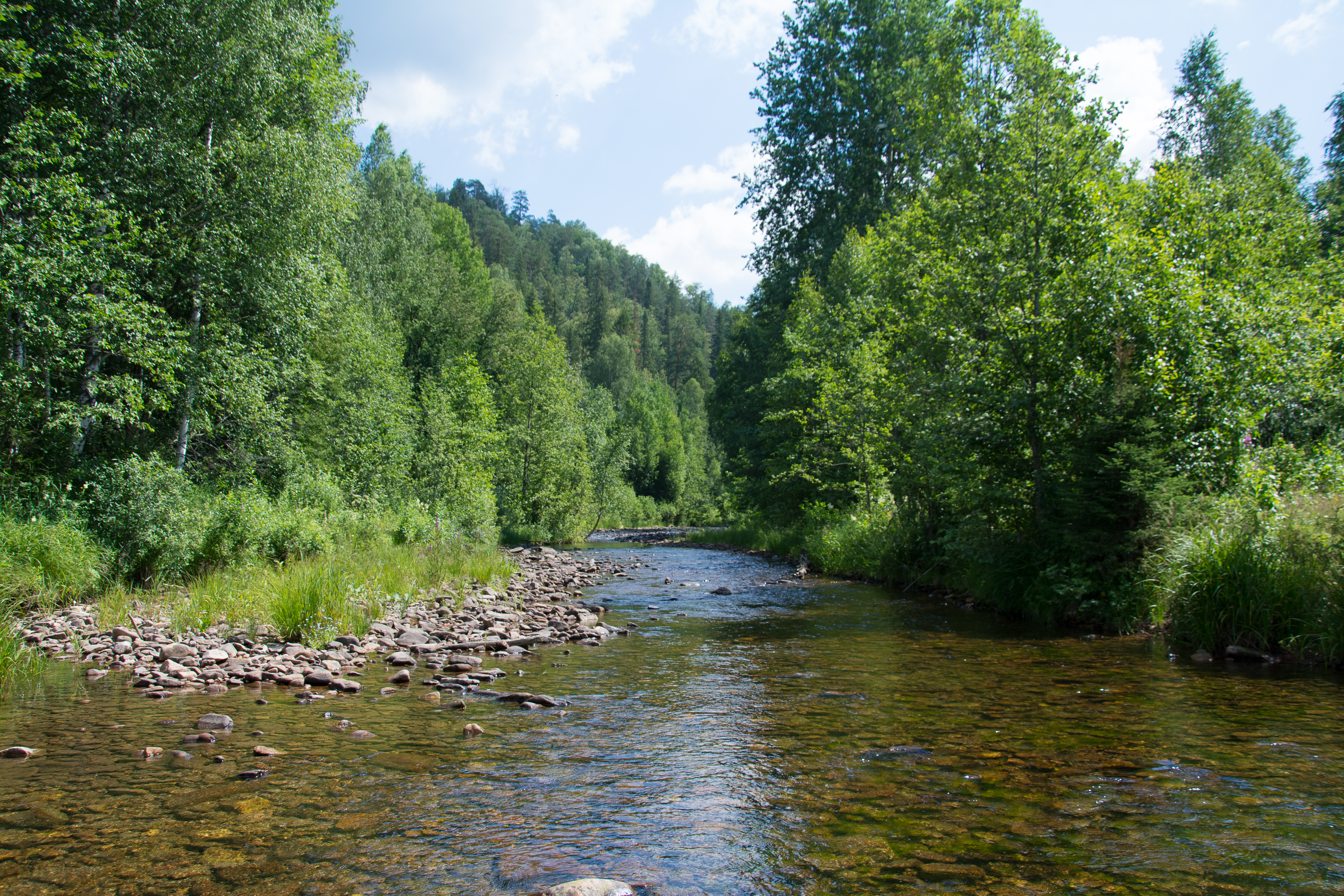
- Small Suren River, Zianchurinsky District

- Flag Coat of arms
- Location of Zianchurinsky District in the Republic of Bashkortostan
- Coordinates: 52°12′N 56°35′E
- Country: Russia
- Federal subject: Republic of Bashkortostan
- Established: August 20, 1930
- Administrative center: Isyangulovo

Area
  - Total: 3,342.35 km^{2} (1,290.49 sq mi)

Population (2010 Census)
  - Total: 27,626
  - Density: 8.2654/km^{2} (21.407/sq mi)
  - Urban: 0%
  - Rural: 100%

Administrative structure
  - Administrative divisions: 15 Selsoviets
  - Inhabited localities: 78 rural localities

Municipal structure
  - Municipally incorporated as: Zianchurinsky Municipal District
  - Municipal divisions: 0 urban settlements, 15 rural settlements
- Time zone: UTC+5 (MSK+2)
- OKTMO ID: 80626000
- Website: http://www.zianchura.ru

Population of Zianchurinsky District
- 2010 Census: 27,626
- 2002 Census: 30,091
- 1989 Census: 27,135
- 1979 Census: 30,176

Zianchurinsky District (Russian: Зианчу́ринский райо́н; Bashkir: Ейәнсура районы, Yeyänsura rayonı) is an administrative and municipal district (raion), one of the fifty-four in the Republic of Bashkortostan, Russia. It is located in the south of the republic and borders with Kugarchinsky District in the north, Zilairsky District in the northeast and east, Khaybullinsky District in the east, and with Orenburg Oblast in the south and west. The area of the district is 3,342.35 square kilometers (1,290.49 sq mi). Its administrative center is the rural locality (a selo) of Isyangulovo. As of the 2010 Census, the total population of the district was 27,626, with the population of Isyangulovo accounting for 26.9% of that number.

== History ==
The district was established on August 20, 1930.

== Administrative and municipal status ==
Within the framework of administrative divisions, Zianchurinsky District is one of the fifty-four in the Republic of Bashkortostan. The district is divided into fifteen selsoviets, comprising seventy-eight rural localities. As a municipal division, the district is incorporated as Zianchurinsky Municipal District. Its fifteen selsoviets are incorporated as fifteen rural settlements within the municipal district. The selo of Isyangulovo serves as the administrative center of both the administrative and municipal district.
