= Đorđe =

- Pronunciation: Serbo-Croatian pronunciation: [d͡ʑôːrd͡ʑe]
- Gender: male

Origin
- Origin: Slavic
- Region of origin: Croatia, Bosnia and Herzegovina, Montenegro

Other names
- Alternative spelling: Djordje
- Related names: Georgios, George

Đorđe (Serbian Cyrillic: Ђорђе; transliterated Djordje) is a masculine given name of Slavic origin, common in Serbian, and to a lesser extent, Croatian. It is derived from Greek Georgios (George in English). Other variants include: Đurđe, Đurađ, Đura, Đuro, Georgije.

== Notable people with the name ==
=== A-J ===
- Đorđe Andrejević Kun (1904–1964), Serbian painter
- Đorđe Babalj (born 1981), Serbian footballer
- Đorđe Bajić (footballer) (born 1977), Serbian footballer
- Đorđe Bajić (novelist) (born 1975), Serbian writer, literary and film critic
- Đorđe Balašević (1953–2021), Serbian recording artist and singer-songwriter
- Đorđe Bašanović (born 1996), Serbian footballer
- Đorđe Bašić (1946–2007), Serbian politician
- Đorđe Bodinović (fl. 1113-1131), King of Duklja and Travunija
- Đorđe Bogić (1911–1941), Serbian Orthodox protopresbyter and priest
- Đorđe Božović (1955–1991), Serbian criminal and paramilitary commander
- Đorđe Branković (1461–1516), Serbian ruler
- Đorđe Branković (count) (1645–1711), Transylvanian diplomat, writer
- Đorđe Cenić (1825–1903), Serbian politician, lawyer and academic
- Djordje Cikusa (Đorđe Cikuša, born 2005), Spanish-Croatian handball player
- Đorđe Ćosić (born 1995), Bosnian footballer
- Đorđe Čotra (born 1984), Serbian footballer
- Đorđe Crnomarković (born 1993), Serbian footballer
- Đorđe Ćurčić (basketball, born 2004), Serbian basketball player
- Đorđe Ćurčić (basketball, born 2005), Serbian basketball player
- Đorđe Ćurčija (died 1804), commander in the First Serbian Uprising
- Đorđe Cvetković (1860–1904), Serbian Chetnik commander
- Đorđe Dabić (born 1991), Serbian politician
- Đorđe Denić (born 1996), Serbian footballer
- Đorđe Despotović (born 1992), Serbian footballer
- Đorđe Detlinger (1912–1978), Yugoslav football player and manager
- Djordje Djikanovic (born 1984), Montenegrin footballer
- Djordje Djokovic (Đorđe Đoković, born 1995), Serbian tennis player
- Đorđe "Đole" Đogani (born 1960), Serbian dancer and singer
- Đorđe Đorđević (born 1988), Serbian footballer
- Đorđe Drenovac (born 1992), Serbian basketball player
- Đorđe Đukić (economist) (born 1952), Serbian economist and politician
- Đorđe Đukić (Vojvodina politician) (born 1948), Serbian politician
- Đorđe Dunđerski (1902–1983), Yugoslav tennis player
- Đorđe Đurić (cyclist) (born 2000), Serbian cyclist
- Đorđe Đurić (footballer) (born 1991), Serbian football player
- Đorđe Đurić (volleyball) (born 1971), Serbian volleyball player
- Đorđe Filipović (born 1978), Serbian swimmer
- Đorđe Gagić (born 1990), Serbian basketball player
- Đorđe Genčić (1861–1938), Serbian industrialist and politician
- Đorđe Gerum (born 1940), Serbian football player and manager
- Đorđe Glišović (born 1995), Serbian footballer
- Đorđe Gogov (born 1988), Serbian singer, musician, and television personality
- Đorđe Golubović (born 1992), Serbian handball player
- Đorđe Gordić (born 2004), Serbian footballer
- Đorđe "Đura" Horvatović (1835–1895), Serbian general and military minister
- Đorđe Inđić (born 1975), Bosnian footballer
- Đorđe Ivanović (born 1995), Serbian footballer
- Đorđe Ivelja (born 1984), Serbian footballer
- Đorđe Jocić (born 1991), Serbian footballer
- Đorđe Jokić (born 1981), Serbian footballer
- Đorđe Jovanović (basketball) (born 1980), Serbian basketballer
- Đorđe Jovanović (footballer) (born 1999), Serbian footballer
- Đorđe Jovanović (sculptor) (1861–1963), Serbian sculptor
- Đorđe Jovanović (writer) (1909–1943), Serbian poet and literary critic
- Đorđe Jovičić (born 2001), Bosnian footballer

=== K-P ===
- Đorđe Kačunković (1928–1994), Serbian footballer
- Đorđe Kadijević (born 1933), Serbian film director, screenwriter and art critic
- Đorđe Kamber (born 1983), Bosnian footballer
- Đorđe Kaplanović (born 1995), Serbian basketball player
- Đorđe Koković (born 1953), Serbian footballer
- Đorđe Komlenski (born 1965), Serbian politician
- Đorđe Konjović (born 1931), Serbian basketball player
- Đorđe Kosanić (born 1967), Serbian politician
- Đorđe Kostić (1909-1995), Serbian writer, poet and linguist
- Đorđe Kratovac (died 1515), also known as Saint George of Kratovo, South Slavic writer and Orthodox martyr
- Đorđe Krstić (1851–1907), Serbian painter
- Đorđe Kunovac (born 1975), Bosnian football player and manager
- Đorđe Lavrnić (1946–2010), Yugoslav handball player
- Đorđe Lazić (footballer) (born 1983), Serbian footballer
- Đorđe Lazić (water polo) (born 1996), Serbian water polo player
- Đorđe Lazović (footballer, born 1990), Serbian footballer
- Đorđe Lazović (footballer, born 1992), Serbian footballer
- Đorđe Lobačev (1909-2002), Russian and Yugoslav comic strip author
- Đorđe M. Pavlović (1838–1921), Serbian politician and academic
- Đorđe Majstorović (born 1990), Serbian basketball player
- Đorđe Majtan (born 1939), Serbian high jumper
- Đorđe Maksimović (born 1999), Serbian footballer
- Đorđe Maletić (1816–1888), Serbian poet
- Đorđe Marjanović (1931–2021), Serbian and Yugoslav singer
- Đorđe Marković Koder (1806–1891), Serbian poet
- Đorđe Marković (born 1987), Serbian swimmer
- Đorđe Martinović (1929-2000), Yugoslav farmer responsible for inciting racial tensions in Yugoslavia
- Đorđe Mihailović (1928–2023), Greek guardian cemetery keeper
- Đorđe Milić (footballer) (born 1943), Yugoslav football player and manager
- Đorđe Milić (runner) (born 1972), Serbian middle-distance runner
- Đorđe Milićević (Vojvodina politician) (born 1967), Serbian politician
- Đorđe Milićević (born 1978), Serbian politician
- Đorđe Milosavljević (basketball) (born 1994), Serbian basketball player
- Đorđe Milosavljević (writer) (born 1969), Serbian screenwriter and film director
- Đorđe Milošević (born 1993), Serbian basketball player
- Đorđe Milovanović (1956–2009), Serbian footballer
- Đorđe Mitrofanović (c. 1550–c. 1630), Serbian Orthodox monk and painter
- Đorđe Mrđanin (born 1981), Serbian footballer
- Đorđe Nemanjić (fl. 1208–1243), Serbian Grand Prince
- Đorđe Nešić (1873–1959), Serbian ophthalmologist
- Đorđe Nikolić (born 1997), Serbian footballer
- Đorđe Novković (1943–2007), Croatian songwriter
- Đorđe Okuka (born 1996), Bosnian footballer
- Đorđe Otašević, Yugoslav basketball player
- Đorđe Pantelić (born 1999), Bosnian footballer
- Đorđe Pantić (born 1980), Serbian footballer
- Đorđe Pavlić (1938–2015), Serbian footballer
- Đorđe Pažin (born 2001), Serbian basketball player
- Đorđe Perišić (born 1941), Montenegrin water polo player
- Đorđe Petronijević (1961–2024), Serbian boxer
- Đorđe Petrović (1762 – 1817), better known as Karađorđe ("Black George"), first monarch of modern Serbia after seceding from the Ottoman Empire, founder of the Karađorđević dynasty
- Đorđe Petrović (footballer) (born 1999), Serbian footballer
- Đorđe Protić (1793—1857), Serbian politician and judge
- Đorđe Prudnikov (1939–2017), Russian painter, graphic artist, and designer

=== R-Z ===
- Đorđe Radovanović (born 1993), Serbian footballer
- Đorđe Radulović (born 1984), Montenegrin diplomat
- Đorđe Rajković (1825–1886), Serbian writer, teacher, and editor
- Đorđe Rakić (born 1985), Serbian footballer
- Đorđe Ribar, American settler in Texas
- Đorđe "Đoko" Rosić (1932–2014), Serbian-Bulgarian actor
- Đorđe Simeunović (born 1995), Serbian basketball player
- Đorđe Simić (1843–1921), Serbian politician and diplomat
- Đorđe Skopljanče (1881—1911), Serbian Chetnik commander
- Đorđe Stanković (born 1989), Serbian politician
- Đorđe Stanojević (1858–1921), Serbian physicist, astronomer and professor
- Đorđe Stefanović (1921–2012), Yugoslav athlete
- Djordje Stijepovic (Đorđe Stijepović, born 1977), American double bass player, singer, and composer
- Đorđe Stojaković (1810–1863), Serbian political activist and revolutionary
- Djordje Stojiljkovic (Đorđe Stojiljković), Serbian cinematographer and visual effects artist
- Đorđe Stojšić (1928–2014), Serbian politician
- Đorđe Stojšić (born 1977), Serbian politician
- Đorđe Stratimirović (1822–1908), Serbian army commander
- Đorđe Šušnjar (born 1992), Serbian footballer
- Đorđe Svetličić (born 1974), Serbian footballer
- Đorđe Todorović (born 1991), Serbian politician
- Đorđe Tomić (born 1972), Serbian footballer
- Đorđe Topalović (born 1977), Serbian footballer
- Đorđe Trifunović (born 1934), Serbian literary scholar and literary historian
- Đorđe Tutorić (born 1983), Serbian footballer
- Đorđe Vajfert (1850–1937), Serbian industrialist
- Đorđe Vasić (born 1964), Serbian footballer
- Đorđe Višacki (born 1975), Serbian rower
- Đorđe Vlajić (born 1977), Serbian footballer
- Đorđe Vojnović (1833–1895), Serbian politician
- Đorđe Vojnović (basketball) (born 1971), Macedonian basketball player
- Đorđe Vujadinović (1909–1990), Yugoslav football player and manager
- Đorđe Vujkov (born 1955), Yugoslav footballer
- Đorđe Vukadinović (born 1962), Serbian philosopher, political analyst, and journalist
- Đorđe Vukobrat (born 1984), Serbian footballer
- Đorđe Zafirović (born 1978), Serbian footballer
- Đorđe Zografski (1871–1945), Yugoslav artist

== See also ==
- Sveti Đorđe (disambiguation)
- Đorđević, a surname
- Đorđić, a surname
