= Georgije =

Georgije (Serbian Cyrillic: Георгије, pronounced [gěorgije] is a Serbian masculine given name, derived from the Greek Georgios.

It is, along with the variants Đorđe, Đurađ and Đuraš, the equivalent of the English George. The surname Georgijević stems from the name.

The name's name day is on 6 May.

It may refer to:

- Georgije "Đura" Jakšić
- Georgije Branković
- Georgije Bakalović
- Georgije Mitrofanović
- Georgije Ilić
- Georgije Magarašević
- Georgije Ostrogorski
- Georgije Đokić
- Georgije Bogić
- Georgije Hranislav

== See also ==
- Đura, diminutive
