= Đurić =

Đurić (Serbian Cyrillic: Ђурић; also transliterated Djuric) is a surname found in Croatia, Bosnia and Serbia, a patronymic derived from the male given name Đuro or Đura. Notable people with the surname include:

- Aleksandar Đurić (born 1970), Bosnian-Singaporean footballer
- Ana Đurić (born 1979), Serbian singer
- Antonije Đurić (1929–2020), Serbian journalist
- Branko Đurić (born 1962), Bosnian actor, comedian, director and musician
- Branko Đurić (b. 2005), Serbian tennis player
- Dusan Djuric (born 1984), Swedish footballer
- Igor Đurić (disambiguation), multiple people
- Mihailo Đurić (1925–2011), Serbian philosopher, professor
- Milan Đurić (born 1990), Bosnian footballer
- Miodrag Dado Đurić (1933–2010), Montenegrin painter
- Mitar Đurić (born 1989), Greek-Serbian volleyball player.
- Rajko Đurić, Serbian politician
- Sladjana Đurić (born 1964), Serbian scientist
- Stefan Đurić (born 1955), Serbian chess grandmaster
- Stanka Gjurić (born 1956), Croatian poet and writer
- Stipan Đurić (Gyurity István), Croatian-Hungarian actor, politician and folk singer
- Veljko Đurić Mišina (born 1953), Serbian historian

== See also ==
- Đurović, surname
- Đurđević (disambiguation), surname
- Đurovski, surname
- Đurica, surname
- Jurić, surname
- Đurići, a town in eastern Croatia
- Bácsszentgyörgy, a village in Hungary known in Serbian as Đurić
