= Đurđević =

Đurđević (Serbian Cyrillic: Ђурђевић, pronounced [dʑǔrdʑɛʋitɕ]; also transliterated Djurdjevic) is a South Slavic surname derived from the masculine given names Đurađ or Đurđe, which are cognates of the name George.

Notable people with the name include:

== People ==
- Bartul Đurđević (1506–1566), Croatian musicologist and lexicographer
- Darko Đurđević (born 1987), Serbian footballer
- Dejan Đurđević (born 1967), Serbian football manager and former player
- Fahrudin Đurđević (born 1992), Macedonian footballer
- Ignjat Đurđević (1675–1737), Ragusan poet and translator
- Ivan Đurđević (born 1977), Serbian footballer
- Marko Djurdjević (born 1979), German illustrator and concept artist of Serbian descent
- Milan Đurđević (born 1967), Serbian footballer
- Miodrag Đurđević (born 1961), football player from Bosnia and Herzegovina
- Nenad Đurđević (born 1987), Serbian footballer
- Nina Đurđević (born 1991), Slovenian beauty pageant winner
- Olivera Đurđević (1928–2006), Serbian pianist, cembalist and professor
- Uroš Đurđević (born 1994), Serbian-Montenegrin footballer

== Places ==
- Đurđević coal mine

== See also ==
- Đorđević, a surname
- Đurđevića Tara Bridge
- Jurjević
