= Glišović =

Glišović is a surname. Notable people with the surname include:

- Đorđe Glišović (born 1995), Serbian footballer
- Rade Glišović (born 1995), Serbian footballer
- Svetislav Glišović (1913–1988), Yugoslav footballer
