= Đura =

Đura (Serbian Cyrillic: Ђура; also transliterated Djura) is a Serbian male given name derived from Đurađ (a Serbian variant of George).

It may refer to:

== People ==
- Đura Dokić (1873–1946), a Serbian general, notable for being an Axis collaborator during World War II
- Đura Džudžar (born 1954), a eparchial bishop of the Greek Catholic Eparchy of Ruski Krstur since 2018
- Đura Horvatović (or Đorđe Đuro Horvatović; 1835–1895), a Serbian general and military minister
- Đura Jakšić (1832–1878), a Serbian poet, painter, writer, dramatist and bohemian
- Đura Sentđerđi (1900–1980) was a Yugoslav swimmer

== See also ==
- Đuro, a South Slavic male given name
- Đurovac, a village in the municipality of Prokuplje, Serbia
- Đurović, a Serbian surname
- Đurić, a Serbian surname
- Đurovski or Ǵurovski, a South Slavic surname
