= Djuras =

Djuras may refer to:

- Djurås, a locality and the seat of Gagnef Municipality in Dalarna County, Sweden
- Đuraš, a Serbian masculine given name
