= Sveti Đurađ =

Sveti Đurađ (Serbo-Croatian for "Saint George") may refer to:

- Sveti Đurađ, Osijek-Baranja County, a village near Donji Miholjac, Croatia
- Sveti Đurađ, Virovitica-Podravina County, a village near Virovitica, Croatia
- the former name of Žitište, Serbia

== See also ==
- Sveti Đurđ, a village and municipality in Varaždin County, Croatia
- Sveti Juraj (disambiguation)
- Sveti Đorđe (disambiguation)
