= Đurović =

Đurović (Serbian Cyrillic: Ђуровић; also transliterated Djurovic) is a Serbian patronymic surname derived from a masculine given name Đuro. It may refer to:

- Borislav Đurović (1952–2003), Montenegrin football player
- Dragan Đurović (born 1959), Montenegrin politician
- Jelena Đurović (born 1973), Montenegrin journalist and political activist
- Nemanja Đurović (born 1986), Serbian-Bosnian football player
- Nenad Đurović (born 1986), Montenegrin football player
- Žarko Đurović (born 1961), Serbian football manager

== See also ==
- Đurić, surname
- Đurđević (disambiguation), surname
- Đurovski, surname
