= Đorđe Bajić =

Đorđe Bajić may refer to:

- Đorđe Bajić (footballer) (born 1977), Serbian footballer
- Đorđe Bajić (novelist) (born 1975), Serbian writer, literary and film critic
