= Đurašević =

Đurašević (Serbian Cyrillic: Ђурашевић; also transliterated Djurašević) is a Serbian surname, derived from the male given name Đuraš (Jurasz, Juraš or Djuraš), a variant of the name Đurađ. It may refer to:

- The Crnojević noble family, descending from Đuraš Ilijić
- Aleksa Đurašević (15th century), nobleman in Zeta
- Božidar Đurašević, Yugoslav chess player
- Đurađ Đurašević (15th century), nobleman in Zeta
