= Durko =

Durko is a surname. It may be a Polish surname. Notable people with the surname include:

- John Durko (1914–1963), American football player
- Mátyás Durkó (1926–2005), Hungarian literary historian, educationalist, andragogist , and university professor
- Sandy Durko (born 1948), American football player
- Zsolt Durkó, Hungarian composer

== See also ==
- Durka
