= Đorđe Stojšić =

Đorđe Stojšić may refer to:

- Đorđe Stojšić (Serbian politician, born 1928)
- Đorđe Stojšić (Serbian politician, born 1977)
