= Stevan Radičević =

Serbian politician

Stefan Radičević Стефан Радичевић
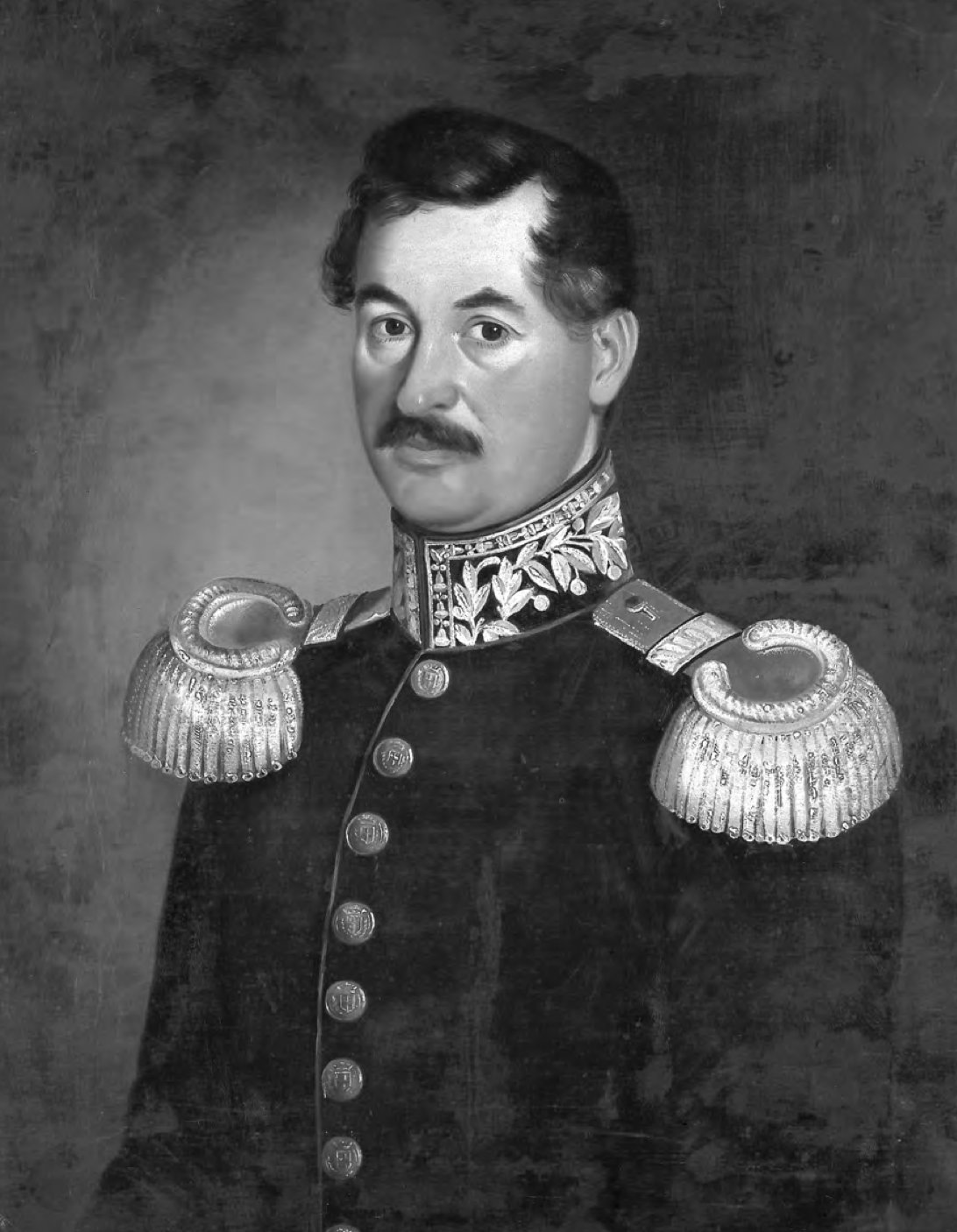
- Portrait of Radičević by Jovan Popović, c. 1840

Minister of Education
- In office 26 June 1840 – 8 September 1842
- Preceded by: Golub Petrović
- Succeeded by: Paun Janković

Minister of Justice
- In office 26 June 1840 – 8 September 1842
- Preceded by: Golub Petrović
- Succeeded by: Paun Janković

Personal details
- Died: 11 March 1871 Belgrade, Principality of Serbia
- Occupation: politician, legal scholar

Military service
- Allegiance: Principality of Serbia
- Rank: Colonel

Stefan Radičević (died 11 March 1871) was a Serbian politician who served as Minister of Education and Minister of Justice in the government of Đorđe Protić, during the reign of Mihailo III from 1840 to 1842.

== Biography ==
A native of Novi Sad, Radičević studied law in Vienna and worked as a legal clerk in Zemun before moving to the newly-autonomous Principality of Serbia, in which he entered government service. In 1835, he assisted Dimitrije Davidović in writing the 1835 Constitution of Serbia and subsequently served as Secretary of the State Council, of which he was also the youngest member. Radičević, a loyalist of the Obrenović dynasty, was a fierce political opponent of Toma Vučić Perišić, whom he publicly denounced a traitor. When Vučić Perišić and the Defenders of the Constitution achieved power in 1842, Radičević, Cvetko Rajović, and Đorđe Protić were exiled. Whilst in exile, Radičević wrote the constitution for the newly-formed government of Serbian Vojvodina. He returned to Serbia upon the restoration of the Obrenović dynasty in 1859 and died in Belgrade in 1871.

In 1841, Radičević was commissioned as a colonel in the Army of the Principality of Serbia.
