= Dura =

Dura may refer to:

== Geography ==
- Dura language, an extinct Sino-Tibetan language of Nepal
- Dura, Africa, an ancient city and former bishopric, now a Catholic titular see
- Dura-Europos, an ancient city located in modern-day Syria, founded in 303 BCE and abandoned in 256–257 CE
- Dora, Baghdad, alternately transliterated "al-Dura", a neighborhood in the Rasheed administrative district in Southern Baghdad, Iraq
- Dorrha, County Tipperary, Ireland, a civil parish (Irish name: Dura)
- Dura, Hebron, a Palestinian town in the southern West Bank located eleven kilometers southwest of Hebron in the Hebron Governorate
- Dura, Manyas, a village in Turkey
- Dura al-Qar', a Palestinian town in the Ramallah and al-Bireh Governorate
- Cișmigiu Gardens, originally named "Lake of Dura the merchant", a public park near the center of Bucharest, Romania that surrounds an artificial lake

== Science ==
- Dura mater, the outermost of the three ('hard', dura in Latin) layers of the meninges surrounding the brain and spinal cord
- Dura (moth), a genus of moths

== Other ==
- "Dura" (song), Daddy Yankee
- Dura Dura, Turkish album
- Dura Automotive Systems, an American automotive company headquartered in Auburn Hills, Michigan and specializing in automobile components

== See also ==
- Đura, name
- Durra
