= Durka =

Durka is a surname. As a Polish surname it may a nickname derived from the term meaning "window grating". Notable people with the surname include:

- Jan Durka (1903-1958), Polish footballer
- Jarosław Durka (born 1970), Polish historian
- Muna Durka (born 1988), Sudanese steeplechase runner

== Fictional characters ==
- List of Farscape characters#Selto Durka

== See also ==
- Dura
