= Đurađ =

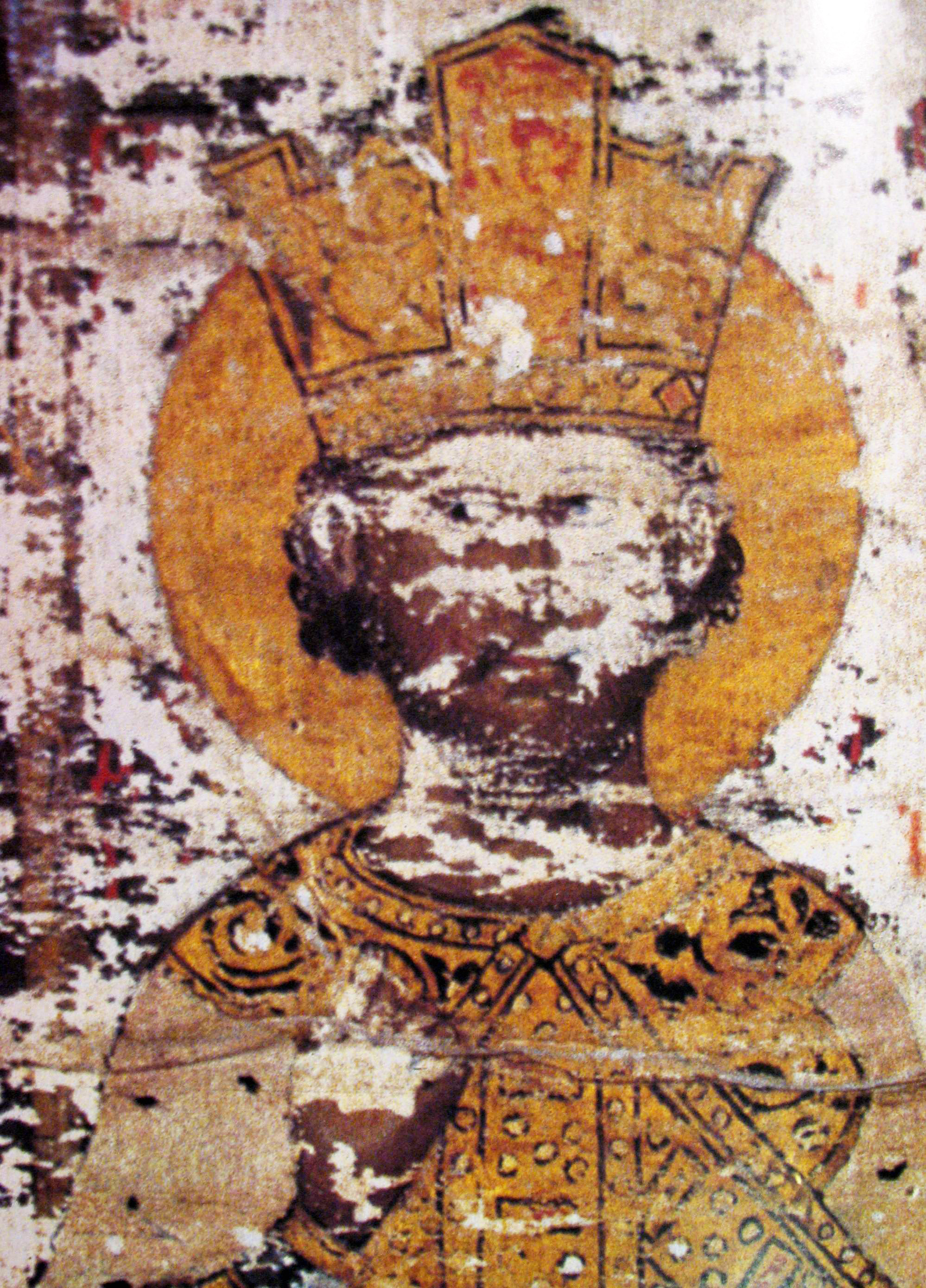
- Đurađ Branković, Serbian Despot (1427—1456)
- Pronunciation: [dʑǔradʑ]
- Gender: masculine
- Language: Serbian
- Name day: 6 May

Origin
- Origin: Greek Georgios
- Region of origin: Balkans

Other names
- Alternative spelling: Djuradj (romanization)
- Variant form: Đura/Đuro (diminutive)
- Related names: George, Đorđe, Đuraš

Đurađ (Serbian Cyrillic: Ђурађ, pronounced [dʑǔradʑ];) is a Serbian masculine given name, derived from the Greek Georgios. It is also transliterated as Djuradj.

It is, along with the variant Đorđe, the equivalent of the English George. It was widespread in medieval Serbia, being the name of many noblemen and magnates.

It may refer to:

- Đurađ I Balšić (fl. 1362–78), Lord of Zeta
- Đurađ II Balšić (1385–1403), Lord of Zeta
- Đurađ Bogutović (fl. 1370–99), Serbian nobleman
- Đurađ Branković (1377–1456), Serbian Despot
- Đurađ Đurašević (fl. 1413–35), Serbian nobleman
- Đurađ Crnojević (fl. 1489–1514), Lord of Zeta
- Đurađ Bošković (1904–1990), Serbian art historian
- Đurađ Vasić (born 1956), Serbian football coach and former player
- Đurađ Jakšić (born 1977), Serbian politician

== See also ==
- Đura, diminutive
- Đuro, diminutive
- Đurđe, given name
- Đurđević
- Sveti Đurađ, placename
