= Durra (disambiguation) =

Durra is Sorghum

Durra may also refer to:

- Louis Durra, American jazz musician
- Mohanna Durra (1938–2021), Jordanian painter
- Yusuf Abu Durra (1900 – 1940), Palestinian Arab soldier
- Durra Border Crossing, border crossing between Aqaba in Jordan and Haql in Saudi Arabia

== See also ==
- Dura (disambiguation)
