= Jurjević =

Jurjević is a Croatian surname. It is a patronymic of Jure or Juraj.

It is one of the most common surnames in the Zadar County of Croatia.

It may refer to:

- Atanazije Jurjević (c.1590–c.1640), baroque composer, writer and diplomat from Split
- Franjo Jurjević (born 1932), Croatian gymnast
