= Avram Petronijević =

Serbian politician

Avram Petronijević Аврам Петронијевић
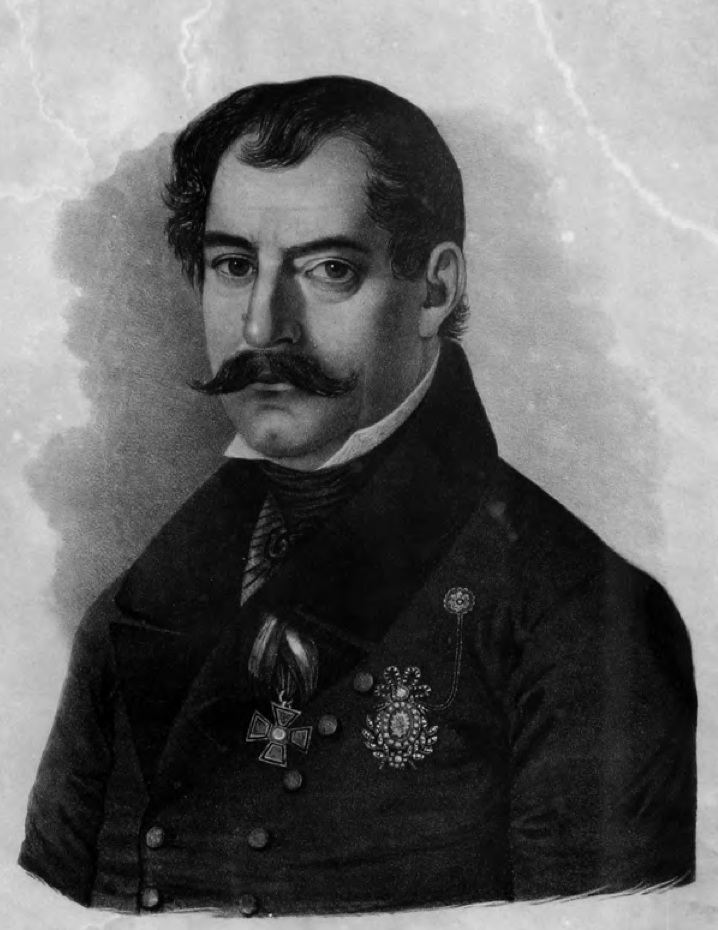

Regent of Serbia
- In office 25 June 1839 – 14 March 1840 Serving with Jevrem Obrenović, Toma Vučić Perišić
- Monarchs: Milan II; Mihailo III

Representative of the Prince of Serbia
- In office 26 February 1839 – 7 April 1840
- Monarchs: Miloš I Mihailo III
- Preceded by: Koca Marković
- Succeeded by: Paun Janković
- In office 7 September 1842 – 6 October 1843
- Monarch: Alexander I
- Preceded by: Đorđe Protić
- Succeeded by: Aleksa Simić
- In office 11 October 1844 – 22 April 1852
- Monarch: Alexander I
- Preceded by: Aleksa Simić
- Succeeded by: Ilija Garašanin

Personal details
- Born: 13 September 1791 Tekija, Ottoman Empire
- Died: 22 April 1852 (aged 60) Constantinople, Ottoman Empire
- Party: None

Avram Petronijević (13 September 1791 – 22 April 1852) was a Serbian politician serving as Minister of Foreign Affairs of the Principality of Serbia on several terms and holding the longest term by one Prime Minister in the political history of Serbia.

== Biography ==
Petronijević was born in Tekija, and was educated in a school in the neighboring Orşova (Romania). In 1817 he returned to Serbia to pursue a political career and soon became the personal secretary of Prince Miloš Obrenović. He was a member of the Serbian deputation in Constantinople from 1821 until 1826, and later several times a Serbian deputy (ćehaja) at the Turkish government (Sublime Porte). Later, with Toma Vučić-Perišić, Dimitrije Davidović, Aleksa Simić, Stojan Simić, Milutin Savić, Ilija Garašanin, Petronijević stood at the head of Ustavobranitelji (Defenders of the Constitution against the Prince Prince Miloš Obrenović. During the reign of Prince Alexander Karađorđević, starting from 1844 until his death he was Minister of Foreign Affairs and Representative of the Prince (Prime Minister). He died in Tsargrad on 22 April 1852 (Julian Calendar) and was buried in the church of St. Petka on the Bosporus, next to Samuilo Jakovljević, a colleague from the Serbian deputation in Constantinople from 1821 until 1826, though Jakovljević died in 1824.

Avram Petronijević founded the first glass factory in Serbia in 1846. It was located between villages Mišević and Belica, near the town of Jagodina. It worked well in the beginning, but ultimately was unable to compete with glass products from Austria, and did not last for long after Petronijević's death.

Government offices
Preceded by Stefan Stefanović Tenka	Prime Minister of Serbia; 1839–1840	Succeeded by Paun Janković
Preceded by Đorđe Protić	Prime Minister of Serbia; 1842–1843	Succeeded by Aleksa Simić
Preceded by Aleksa Simić	Prime Minister of Serbia; 1844–1852	Succeeded by Ilija Garašanin
Preceded by Dimitrije Davidović	Minister of Foreign Affairs; 1835–1840	Succeeded by Đorđe Protić
Preceded by Aleksa Simić	Minister of Foreign Affairs; 1844–1852	Succeeded by Aleksa Janković
