= Paun Janković =

Serbian politician

Paun Janković Паун Јанковић

Representative of the Prince of Serbia
- Acting
- In office 7 April 1840 – 15 May 1840
- Monarch: Mihailo III
- Preceded by: Avram Petronijević
- Succeeded by: Đorđe Protić

Minister of Education and Justice
- In office 1842–1847
- Preceded by: Stevan Radičević
- Succeeded by: Aleksa Janković

Personal details
- Born: 1808 Smederevo, Ottoman Empire
- Died: 25 July 1865 (aged 56–57) Smederevo, Principality of Serbia
- Occupation: politician

Paun Janković (Serbian Cyrillic: Паун Јанковић; Smederevo, 1808 – Smederevo, 25 July 1865) was a Serbian politician who held the post of acting Prime Minister of Serbia, Minister of Finance, Minister of External affairs and Minister of Justice and Education. Janković was one of the notable Defenders of the Constitution.

Baća was born in 1808 in Konjska (later Mihailovac) in Smederevo nahija. His father, Janko Đurđević, was a counselor for the Smederevo nahija during the time of Karađorđe. He was educated in Russia, and returned to Serbia at the invitation of Prince Miloš Obrenović, and joined him as a clerk in the prince's chancery, which served as a government. He was later promoted to Director of the Prince's chancery. He wrote many letters under the dictatorship of Prince Miloš. Due to his stay in Russia, Prince Miloš gave him the nicknames Baćuška or Baća, which stuck for the rest of his life.

Government offices
Preceded by Avram Petronijević	Prime Minister of Serbia; 1840	Succeeded by Đorđe Protić
Preceded by Avram Petronijević	Minister of Foreign Affairs; 1840	Succeeded by Đorđe Protić
Preceded by Stevan Radičević	Minister of Education and Justice; 1842–1847	Succeeded by Aleksa Janković
Preceded by Đorđe M. Pavlović	Minister of Finance of Serbia; 1848–1854	Succeeded by Vukašin J. Petrović
