= Đuro =

Đuro (Serbian Cyrillic: Ђуро; also transliterated Djuro or Gjuro) is a South Slavic male given name derived from Đurađ (a Serbian variant of George).

It may refer to:

- Đuro Bago (born 1961), a football coach and sports director
- Đuro Basariček (1884–1928), a Croatian politician, lawyer and social activist
- Đuro Daničić (1825–1882), a Serbian philologist
- Đuro Deželić (1838–1907), a Croatian writer
- Đuro Đaković (1886–1929), a Yugoslav communist politician
- Đuro Ferić (1739–1820), a Croatian poet and Jesuit vicar general
- Đuro Kurepa (1907–1993), a Yugoslav mathematician
- Đuro Salaj (1889–1958), a first president of the United Labour Unions of Yugoslavia
- Đuro Pilar (1846–1893), a Croatian geologist, professor and rector at the University of Zagreb
- Đuro Pucar (1899–1979), a Yugoslav and Bosnian politician
- Đuro Živković (born 1975), a Serbian-Swedish composer and violinist
- Đuro Zec (born 1990), a Serbian football player
- Gjuro Baglivi (1668–1707), an Italian physician and scientist

== See also ==
- Branko Đurić Đuro (born 1962), a Bosnian actor, comedian, director, and musician
- Đorđe Đura Horvatović (or Đorđe Đuro Horvatović; 1835–1895), a Serbian general and military minister
- Djurö (disambiguation)
- Đura, a Serbian male given name
- Đurovac, a village in the municipality of Prokuplje, Serbia
- Đurović, a Serbian surname
- Đurić, a Serbian surname
- Đurovski or Ǵurovski, a South Slavic surname
