= Đorđe Marković Koder =

Serbian poet (1806–1891)

Đorđe Marković Koder Ђорђе Марковић Кодер
- Born: 1806; Vizić, Kingdom of Slavonia, Austrian Empire (now Vizić, Serbia)
- Died: April 30, 1891; Novi Sad, Austria-Hungary (now Novi Sad, Serbia)
- Occupation: Poet

Đorđe Marković Koder (Serbian: Ђорђе Марковић Кодер; (1806 – April 30, 1891) was a Serbian poet born in Austrian Empire. Misunderstood, largely forgotten and often considered a marginal figure in Serbian poetry, criticized for his cryptic style littered with incomprehensible words and obscure metaphors, Koder was nevertheless a unique phenomenon in the 19th century Serbian literature, sometimes cited as the first Serbian modernist.

== Biography ==
Đorđe Marković Koder was, by his own account, born in 1806 in the village of Vizić or Bingula, in Fruška gora, present-day Serbia. Soon after that his family moved to Sremska Mitrovica, where his father worked as a merchant and ran a general store. After finishing German elementary school in Mitrovica, Koder was sent to Szeged, Hungary, where he finished Piarist high school. In 1831 he graduated from the two-year Protestant law school, where he found a job as a fencing instructor with the army.

In 1837 Koder obtained a passport with the aim of going to Istanbul, via Bucharest and Athens. However, as he didn't manage to raise the money for the journey, he was compelled to move to Trieste, where his brother Jovan worked as an accountant for an American company. He lived in a poor suburb of Trieste, dedicating his time to writing and trying to procure a job. He corresponded with his relative Marija Popović-Punktatorka, the soon-to-be wife of Sima Milutinović Sarajlija. As he failed in the latter, in 1838 he moved back to Szeged and then Budapest, where he attended university lectures in various disciplines, such as medicine, astronomy and aesthetics. At the same time he tried to learn and perfect multiple languages – English, French, Greek and Sanskrit.

In 1839 Koder suddenly decided to move to Kragujevac, Serbia, where he became a fencing and gymnastics instructor for Mihailo and Milan, the sons of prince Miloš Obrenović. He also worked as an interpreter for the prince. When Miloš Obrenović abdicated from power, in June 1839, Koder moved to Belgrade, where he worked at odd jobs until he managed to open a fencing school in 1844. The funding for the school was provided by Jovan Ninić, a wealthy Serbian patriot from Belgrade. One year later Koder returned to Szeged, then to Timișoara, then back to Belgrade, where he found a house in the poor suburb of Palilula and became friends with Jakov Ignjatović, a famous Serbian novelist and prose writer, and writer Milan Savić. Both Savić and Ignjatović left vivid reminiscences of him in their respective memoirs.

In 1852, Serbian magazine Svetovid, from Timișoara, published two Koder's poems: Grlica (Turtle Dove) and Leptir (Butterfly). In September 1858 he had almost completed his master poem, Romoranka, for which he unsuccessfully tried to organize a public reading in Belgrade. In a Letter to his relative Marija Popović-Milutinović (better known as Punktatorka) we read that he is about to finish Romoranka, about to write Tolkovka as an addition to it, and that he was about to write another book called Milogorka i Devesilje. Next month he got a permanent job as a fighting instructor in the Artillery School in Belgrade, and in 1859 he applied for Serbian citizenship. He continued his work on Romoranka, and in 1860 published an advertisement calling for subscribers.

When a series of uprisings against the Ottoman government broke out in Montenegro and Herzegovina in 1861, Serbian government sent Đorđe Marković Koder as an emissary and a negotiator between warring sides, carrying letters on the behalf of the European Commission. Marković's role in the negotiations remains unclear and the historical data are scarce.

In 1861. Koder moved to Novi Sad, where he managed to publish a couple of his poems in the magazines Danica and Javor, the latter edited by Jovan Jovanović Zmaj. His main poem, Romoranka, which integrated and extended many of the motives exhibited in his previous poems, was finally published in September 1862.

Milka Grgurova, an actress from Novi Sad, left a vivid account of her visit to Koder's rented room, shown in by the poet's landlady as he was not at home at the time of the visit. Her account gives us an interesting insight into his lifestyle.

Slovar, The Dictionary by Đ. M. Koder

"When we entered the room... The things that we saw! First we heard a piglet, that came right to us. It probably thought that its master, Koder, had come home. White rabbits, chicken, ducklings and whatnot! And all that crowd greeted us with much noise and affection. All that four-legged and feathery two-legged company lived in perfect harmony. What's more, the whole menagerie lived with Koder, in a single room furnished in a very original way. In one corner there was a bed, with straw mat covered by a thick blanket. By the window there was a simple merchant's chest, which he used as a writing desk, on top of which there was a whole mess of papers, books, goose quilts and an earthen inkstand. In the mess I could discern a book titled Romoranka, which he later gave me as a gift, as well as some poems by Branko Radičević" .

After publishing Romoranka, Marković left Novi Sad for Istanbul, where he spent a couple of years working as an interpreter for various embassies. In 1867 he was back in Timosoara. A letter has been preserved, written to him by Dragiša Milutinović, to inform Koder that the book "A Grammar of the Persian Language" had been procured and sent to him, as he had requested. In February 1868 he undertook a long journey around Italy, after which he returned to Bucharest and then to Timișoara, where he continued studying Turkish and Arabic, planning to translate Romoranka to the latter. In May 1872 he returned to Istanbul, where he got a job at the British embassy. As an interpreter for Arabic and Turkish, he went on a number of missions with the British embassy staff, including at least one journey to northern Africa.

Some 16 years later, when most of his friends had believed he had been long dead, he suddenly returned to Novi Sad in 1888. Despite his age (82) he was in good health. He stayed with his friend Đoka Kamber, whom he informed that he had come to Novi Sad to die and be buried there. In 1890 he lived in "Ubogi dom", a refuge for homeless people in Novi Sad. There he surrounded himself with a number of cats and dogs, which he had befriended. He died on April 30, 1891.

== Work ==
Đorđe Marković Koder was an active and relatively prolific writer, even though he only managed to publish one book, Romoranka, containing his 10.000 verses long poem together with the author's notes and explanations. His four other long poems – San Matere Srbske, Devesilje, Mitologije and Iskoni – were collected and published in 1979 by Božo Vukadinović, in a book titled Spevovi. He also wrote Slovar, a dictionary aimed at expounding and clarifying the notions used in his poetry. It was published in 2005 by Narodna biblioteka "Vuk Karadžić".

In his attempt to explain and describe his vision of the world by means of poetry, Koder had to construct a number of notions and corresponding terms. Most of his terminology is based on Serbian language, but derivatives of foreign words were also used, as well as a number of archaisms, compound nouns and words whose meaning can be inferred from the sound rather than the semantics. His dictionary contains most of his terminology, but many notions were explained using other incomprehensible constructs, obscure wording or recursive definitions. What's more, the dictionary does not follow alphabetical order, which makes it even more complicated to comprehend. Some of the definitions in the dictionary were given in different languages, while some terms were explained by drawings and mathematical formulas.

Koder's personal mythology often features various species of plants and birds, as well as dreams, spirits, fairies and cosmical forces, whose complex interplay forms the basis of existence. Even though generally coherent and consistent in itself, his work is extremely hermetic and self-contained, almost impenetrable even to the most educated readers.

== Criticism ==
When it was published, in 1862, Romoranka attracted some attention in Serbian literary circles in Novi Sad and Belgrade, but the main problem with it was that hardly anyone could understand what it was about. Even though Koder claimed to have used the words he learned from old women and peasants all around Serbia, it is possible that many of those words were actually invented by himself. Romoranka was described by Jovan Jovanović Zmaj as "incomprehensible, obscure and impossible to understand, despite the explanations that comprise one third of the book."

Jovan Skerlić, a prominent Serbian literary critic of the time, described Koder's Romoranka as "the most insane book of our romanticism, a blurry symbolic description of lives of birds and plants." Koder's "preposterous language" was, according to Skerlić, "a sickly original vocabulary", and his whole opus could only be described as "the jester's hat on the head of Serbian literature".
