= Djurö =

- Djurö, Värmdö Municipality - an island and a locality situated in Värmdö Municipality, Stockholm County, Sweden
- Djurö, Vänern - an island in Lake Vänern, Sweden
- Djurö National Park - a national park in Sweden
