= Nemanja Đurović =

Serbian-Bosnian footballer

Personal information
- Full name: Nemanja Đurović
- Date of birth: 20 December 1986 (age 39)
- Place of birth: Belgrade, SFR Yugoslavia
- Height: 1.84 m (6 ft 1/2 in)
- Position: Right midfielder

Senior career*
Years	Team	Apps	(Gls)
2005–2007	Slavija Sarajevo	2	(0)
2007	Ethnikos Achna	9	(0)
2008	Smederevo	6	(0)
2008–2010	Kolubara	13	(5)
2009	→ Napredak Kruševac (loan)	7	(0)
2009–2010	Sinđelić Beograd	21	(9)
2010–2011	Banat Zrenjanin	30	(5)
2012	Ohrid	12	(1)
2012	Teteks	12	(0)
- * Club domestic league appearances and goals as of 20 December 2010

Nemanja Đurović (Serbian Cyrillic: Немања Ђуровић; born 20 December 1986) is a Serbian-Bosnian professional footballer.

== Career ==
He was playing in FK Slavija Sarajevo, when in summer 2007, he moved to Cyprus to play half season in Ethnikos Achna FC. In winter, he moved to Serbia where he played in the Serbian Superliga club FK Smederevo, until the end of the season. In the summer of 2008, he moved to the Serbian First League (second level league) club FK Kolubara, and the next winter, he moved back to top league, this time to FK Napredak Kruševac. He plays in both right and side positions, as midfielder or defender. His market value is estimated to be 200.000 Euros.
