= Atanazije Jurjević =

Atanazije Jurjević, signed himself as Jurjevich-Dalmata (Latin: Athanasius Georgiceus, German: Athanasius Georgijević; c.1590 – c.1640) was a Croatian baroque composer, writer and diplomat. He was born into a well-known patrician family from Split.

He studied in Split and at Ferdinandeum in Graz (1609–1611). He served as Consiliarius (advisor) of Ferdinand II, Holy Roman Emperor and travelled to Poland, Russia and Bosnia.

His most known work is titled "Pisni za naypoglavitiye, naysvetiye i nayveselye dni svega godischia sloxene: i kakose u Organe s'yednim glasom mogu spivati, napravgliene", a collection of compositions published in 1635.

== Published works ==
- Od naslidovanya Isukarstova kgnighe cetvereNaslidovanje Isukrstovo (Beč, 1629.), prepjev na hrvatski znane knjige Tome Kempenskoga
- Prilike i promišljenja sarca človičanskoga (1633.)
- Naslidovanja duhovna (1633.)
- Nastojanja duhovna u kojih se uzdarži način kako bi moga dobar karstjanin svaki dan, i u koje vrime, BOGA i stvorca svoga moliti, i inimi molitvami i pisni B. D. Marije, i ostalih svetih, a navlastito na poglavite blagdane, duhovno i korisno sebe zabaviti. Skupljena i složena po Atanasiju Georgiceu. Pritiskano u Beču, po Mateu Formiku. Lito Gospodina našega Isukarsta M. D C. XXXIII.

== Bibliography ==
- Ennio Stipčević: ‘Habent sua fata libelli: “Pisni” (1635) Atanazija Jurjevića’, Arti musices, xxvi (1995), str. 65–72
- J. Mantuani: ‘Hrvatska crkvena pjesmarica iz god. 1635’, Sveta Cecilija, ix (1915)
- István György Tóth: Na putu kroz Slavoniju pod krinkom (1626.). Putovanje dalmatinskog humanista Atanazija Jurjevića (Georgiceo) – novi rukopis i nova interpretacija(Scrinia Slavonica, Vol.3 No.1 Studeni 2003.)
- Alfred Baumgartner: Propyläen Welt der Musik Band 2, 1989, ISBN 3549078323, S. 417
