= Đorđe Kosanić =

Serbian politician

Đorđe Kosanić (Serbian Cyrillic: Ђорђе Косанић; born 24 October 1967) is a Serbian politician. He has served in the National Assembly of Serbia since 2012 as a member of United Serbia.

== Early life and career ==
Kosanić was born in Kragujevac, then part of the Socialist Republic of Serbia in the Socialist Federal Republic of Yugoslavia. He is a professor of technical education in private life and has served as assistant director of the sports centre Mladost.

== Municipal politician ==
Kosanić was elected to the municipal assembly of Kragujevac in 2000 as a member of the Democratic Party of Serbia. He remained with this party's assembly group until 2005, when he left to form his own political organization called Prestonica, which described itself as supporting traditional Serbian values. In 2006, the group merged with United Serbia.

In addition to serving as a member of the National Assembly, Kosanić remains a member of the Kragujevac city assembly as of 2017.

== Member of the Assembly ==
United Serbia has contested every Serbian parliamentary election since 2008 as part of the Socialist Party of Serbia's electoral alliance. Kosanić received the twenty-seventh position on the Socialist-led electoral list in the 2012 Serbian parliamentary election and was elected when the list won forty-four mandates. He was re-elected in both 2014 and 2016. He currently serves as a member of the parliamentary foreign affairs committee; a member of the committee on education, science, technological development, and the information society; a deputy member of two other committees; and a member of the parliamentary friendship groups with Belarus, Greece, and Montenegro.

United Serbia has provided external support to Serbia's coalition government led by the Serbian Progressive Party since 2012, and Jevđić has served as part of the government's parliamentary majority since first being elected to the assembly.
