= Vizić =

Vizić Визић (Serbian)
- Village (Selo)
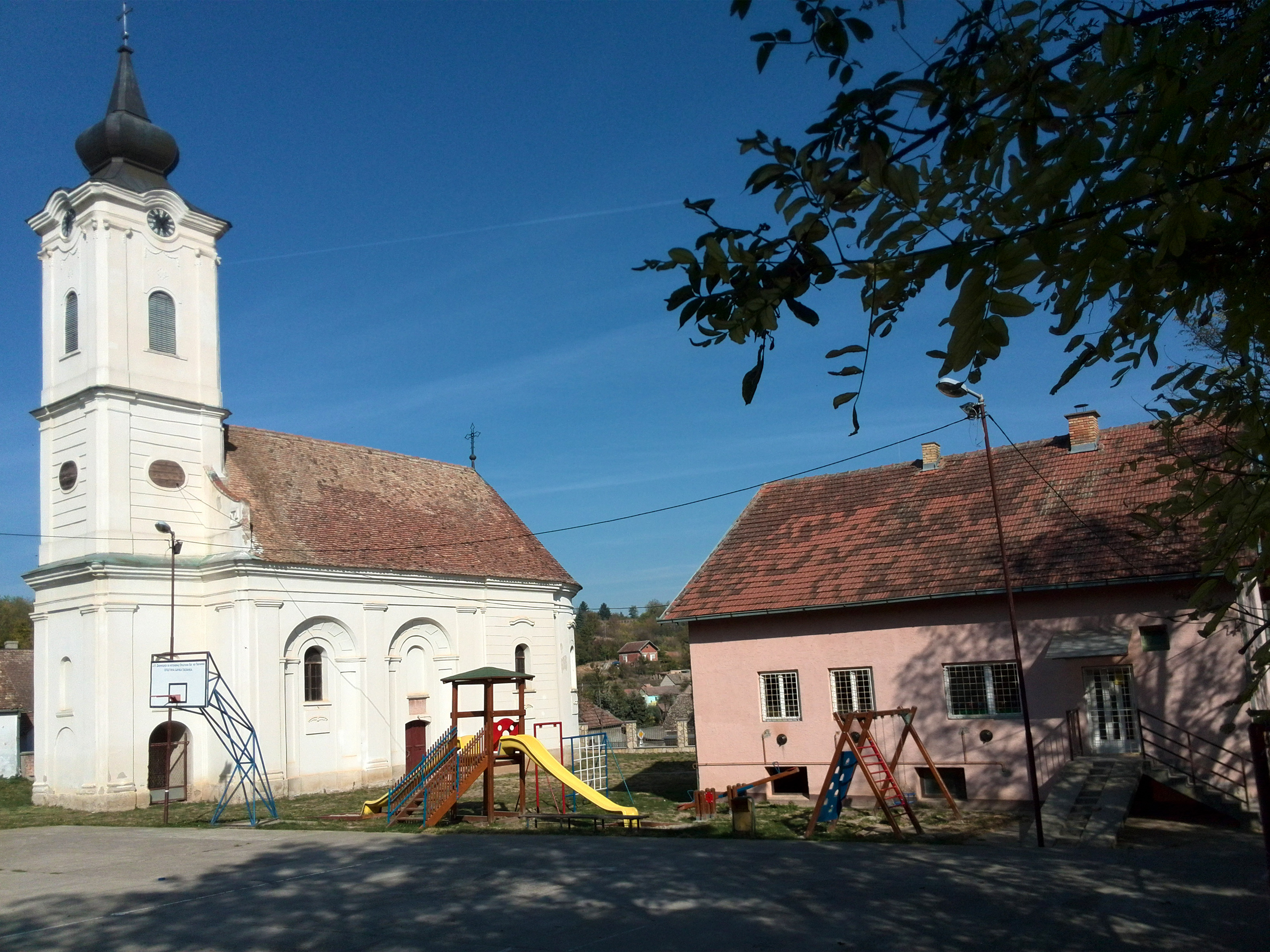
- Interactive map of Vizić
- Map of the Bačka Palanka municipality, showing the location of Vizić Vizić (Serbia) Vizić (Europe)
- Coordinates: 45.172°N 19.453°E
- Country: Serbia
- Province: Vojvodina
- Region: Syrmia (Podunavlje)
- District: South Bačka
- Municipality: Bačka Palanka

Population (2002)
  - Total: 349
- Time zone: UTC+1 (CET)
  - Summer (DST): UTC+2 (CEST)

Vizić (Serbian Cyrillic: Визић) is a village located in the Bačka Palanka municipality, in the South Bačka District of Serbia, although it is not geographically located in Bačka, but in Syrmia. The village is situated in the Autonomous Province of Vojvodina. The population of Vizić numbering 349 people (2002 census), of whom 323 are ethnic Serbs.

== Historical Populations ==
- 1961: 396
- 1971: 421
- 1981: 428
- 1991: 392
- 2002: 349

== See also ==
- List of places in Serbia
- List of cities, towns and villages in Vojvodina
