= Đurovski =

Đurovski (Serbian Cyrillic: Ђуровски; also transliterated Djurovski) or Ǵurovski (Macedonian: Ѓуровски; also transliterated Gjurovski), is a South Slavic surname derived from Serbian Đurić/Đurović, and may refer to:

- Boško Đurovski (born 1961), Macedonian football player, Milko's brother
- Milko Đurovski (born 1963), Macedonian football player, Boško's brother, Mario's father
- Mario Đurovski (born 1985), Macedonian football player, Milko's son.

== See also ==
- Đuro, a South Slavic male given name
