= Đurađ Vasić =

Serbian footballer and coach (born 1956)

Personal information
- Date of birth: 19 September 1956 (age 70)
- Place of birth: Stari Lec, FPR Yugoslavia
- Position: Midfielder

Senior career*
Years	Team	Apps	(Gls)
1975–1984	Novi Sad	197	(15)
1984–1985	VfR Bürstadt	23	(4)
Total		220	(19)

Managerial career
- 1992–1994: VfR Bürstadt
- 1994–2002: Schweinfurt
- 2002–2006: Wehen Wiesbaden
- 2006: Eintracht Braunschweig
- 2007–2008: Wehen Wiesbaden
- 2008–2009: Elversberg
- 2011–2012: MSV Duisburg II
- * Club domestic league appearances and goals

Đurađ Vasić (Serbian Cyrillic: Ђурађ Васић, pronounced [dʑǔradʑ vâːsitɕ]; born 19 September 1956) is a Serbian former football player and coach.

== Career ==
Vasić began his senior career with Yugoslav second division club FK Novi Sad. He also was lined up for 17 matches of Yugoslavia's Olympic football selection. 1984 he moved to Germany to play as defender for VfR 1910 Bürstadt. He appeared 24 times in the 2. Bundesliga, scoring three goals, thereof two penalties. After that season Bürstadt was relegated, but Đurađ Vasić stuck with the club for seven years in the third division.

In the coaching career that ensued in 1992, initially in Bürstadt, he generally was at the helm of third division clubs. 1994 he started coaching FC Schweinfurt 05 in the fourth division, achieving promotion in 1998 and another one to the second division in 2001. Inside a year though, Schweinfurt was relegated again and he got eventually the sack in November 2002.

From 2003 to 2006 he coached third division side SV Wehen, missing out on promotion by only one point in 2005.

In October 2006 he was hired by second division side Eintracht Braunschweig as successor to Michael Krüger and interim coach Willi Kronhardt. An exit clause in his contract with Wehen allowed him that move. After five matches without gaining a single point, Eintracht thought it pointless to hang on to him and let him go by November. Eintracht was relegated as dead last by the end of the season all the same. Two more coaches, Willi Reimann and Dietmar Demuth made it altogether five for the season.

In 2007, he had a this time short stint with Wehen: already out by mid August 2007. In March 2008 he took on SV Elversberg where he was let go by October 2009. From July 2011 he coached the second team of MSV Duisburg for a year.

In 2012 he got a job as sports director supervisor with SV Wiesbaden.
