= Bartul Đurđević =

Bartul Đurđević (also Bartol and Gyurgieuvits, Jurjevic, Gjurgjevic; 1506–1566) was a Croatian musicologist and lexicographer.

He was born in Turopolje near Zagreb, and was captured by the Ottomans in the Battle of Mohács in 1526. He lived as a slave for 13 years before escaping. During this period he could learn and grasp the basics of Turkish music. Years later, in 1544 he published De Turcarum ritu et caeremoniis in Amsterdam which was one of the first European books to describe music in the Ottoman society of that day.

Đurđević is also known to have written the first known Croatian-Latin dictionary in 1544. He is also the author of the practical Italian-Arabic-Hebrew-Aramaic dictionary. His works in the field were published in many languages.

== Sources ==
- Croatian Humanists, Ecumenists, Latinists, and Encyclopaedists
- Krasić, Stjepan (1993). "ĐURĐEVIĆ, Bartul (Georgevits, Georgievicz, Georgievits, Georgieviz, Gyorgievits, Gyurgevits, Georgius Hongarus, Georgius Pannonius; Bartholomaeus, Bartholomeo, Bartol)". Croatian Biographical Lexicon (in Croatian). Miroslav Krleža Institute of Lexicography.
