= Đorđe Mrđanin =

Serbian footballer

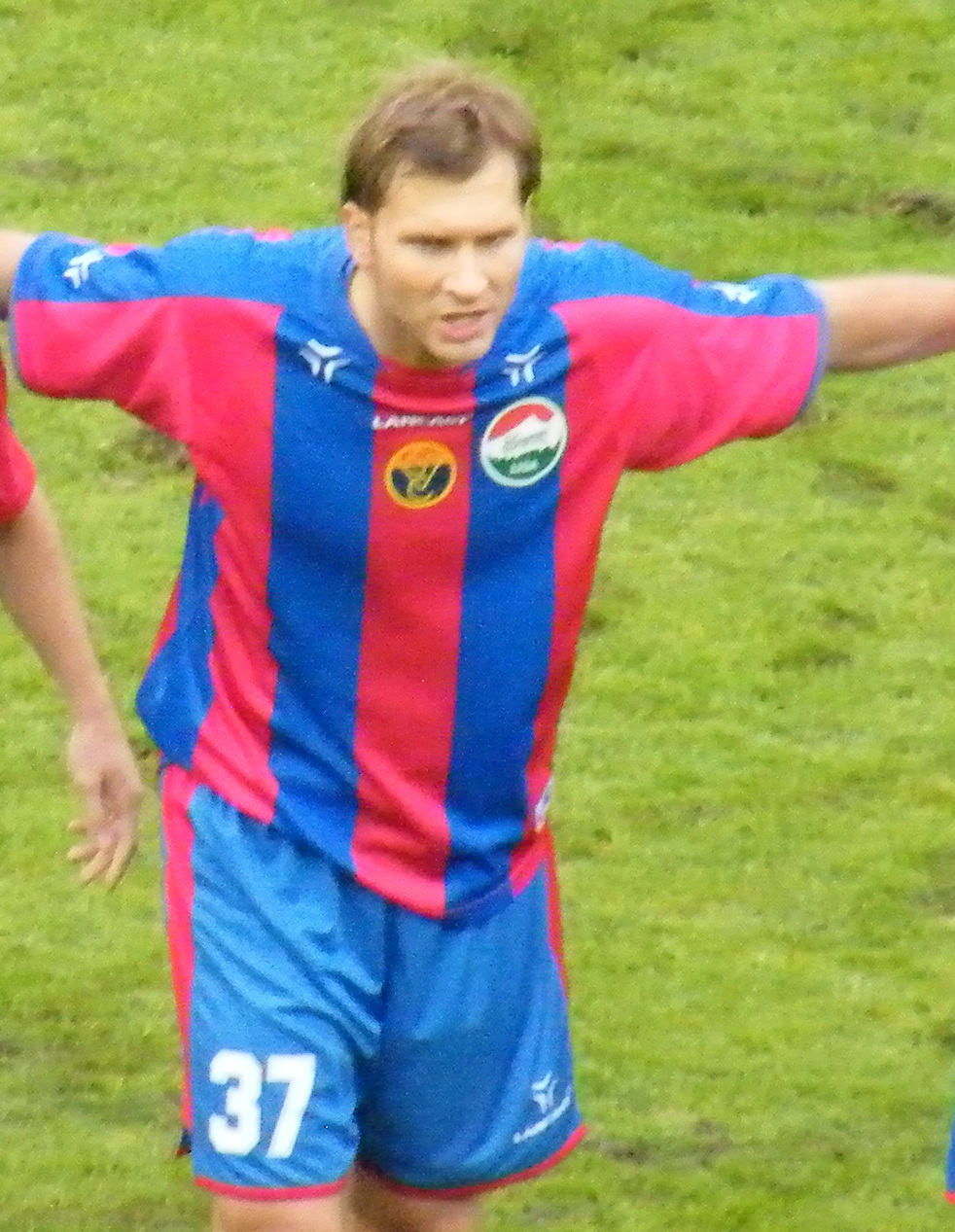

Personal information
- Date of birth: February 26, 1981 (age 45)
- Place of birth: Novi Sad, SFR Yugoslavia
- Height: 1.89 m (6 ft 2 1/2 in)
- Position: Central defender

Senior career*
| Years | Team | Apps | (Gls) |
| 1997–1999 | Kabel | 7 | (0) |
| 1999–2002 | OFK Beograd | 12 | (0) |
| 2001–2002 | → Proleter Zrenjanin (loan) | 14 | (1) |
| 2002–2004 | Veternik | 43 | (0) |
| 2004–2005 | Proleter Zrenjanin | 10 | (0) |
| 2005–2008 | Hajduk Kula | 37 | (1) |
| 2007 | → Degerfors (loan) | | |
| 2008–2009 | IFK Norrköping | 15 | (1) |
| 2009 | Vasas | 6 | (1) |
| 2010 | Hajduk Kula | 18 | (1) |
| 2011 | FC Vostok | 14 | (1) |
| 2011 | Novi Sad | 9 | (0) |
| 2012 | Radnički Sombor | 9 | (0) |
- * Club domestic league appearances and goals

Đorđe Mrđanin (Serbian Cyrillic: Ђорђе Мрђанин; born February 26, 1981) is a Serbian football defender.

== Career ==
Beside playing for FK Hajduk Kula where he spend the most of his career, he also played for FK Kabel, OFK Beograd and FK Proleter Zrenjanin in Serbia, Degerfors IF and IFK Norrköping in Sweden and Hungarian Vasas SC.
