= Slađana Đurić =

Serbian scientist and university professor

- Born: Slađana Đurić; June 30, 1964; Pristina, AP Kosovo
- Education: Pristina University
- Occupations: Scientist and university professor

Slađana Đurić (Serbian Cyrillic: Слађана Ђурић; born 30 June 1964) is a Serbian scientist and university professor.

== Education ==
Đurić was born in Pristina, AP Kosovo, SFR Yugoslavia and finished her primary and graduated from secondary school in Pristina. She started her studies of philosophy and sociology at Faculty of Philosophy in Pristina, in the academic year 1982/3 and got her bachelor's degree in the academic year 1984/5. In 1989 she took the postgraduate course "Philosophy and Social Science" at Inter-university Center for Postgraduate Studies in Dubrovnik, Yugoslavia, on a grant by Hilda’s College, University of Oxford. She finished her post graduate studies at the University of Belgrade's Law School, in 1993 and got the academic title Master of Humanities by having defended the master’s thesis "Some Concepts of Social Structure of Yugoslav Society". She successfully defended the doctoral thesis "Blood Vengeance in Kosovo and Metohia" at the University of Belgrade Faculty of Philosophy in 1997, thus acquiring the academic title Doctor of Humanities.

== Career ==
She started her academic career at Faculty of Philosophy, University of Pristina in 1987. There she teaches the course Sociology II. Besides that, she teaches sociology and methodology of scientific research at University of Belgrade and is Vice-Dean in charge of postgraduate studies and scientific and research work at the University of Belgrade Faculty of Civil Defense. She also taught at the International Interdisciplinary Post-Graduate Studies "State Executive and Humanitarian Activities", organized by University of Belgrade in co-operation with La Sapienza University, Rome, and the University of Sarajevo, Bosnia and Herzegovina.

== Published works (selection) ==
- Оsveta i kazna, Sociološko istraživanje krvne osvete na Кosovu i Мetohiјi, 341. str, Prosveta, Niš, 1998.
- "Sociјalna struktura u јugoslovenskoј sociologiјi", Zbornik radova Filozofskog fakulteta, XX, Univerzitet u Prištini, str. 173–182, Pristina, 1990.
- "Sociodemografske osobine stanovništva Кosova i Мetohiјe", Zbornik radova Filozofskog fakulteta, XXIII-XXIV, Univerzitet u Prištini, str. 97-118, Pristina, 1995.
- "Izvori za istraživanje krvne osvete na Кosovu i Мetohiјi", Sociologiјa, 2/1995, str. 175–196, Belgrade
- "A Case Study of the Feud (vendetta) in Kosovo and Metohija (Yugoslavia)", saopštenje na: Second European Conference for Sociology - European societies fusion or fission (30 August-2 September 1995. Budapest), Sociološki pregled, 4/1995, str. 545–553, Belgrade
- "Profesionalizaciјa i odgovornost medicine - sociološko gledište", saopštenje na naučnom skupu "Еdukaciјa u medicini" održanom na Мedicinskom fakultetu u Prištini (24.11.1995.), Еdukaciјa u medicini, zbornik radova, str. 47–52, Udruženje Nauka i društvo, Pristina, 1995.
- "Кriza i sociologiјa", saopštenje na naučnom skupu "Nauka u kriznim uslovima" održanom 14. maјa 1993. u Prištini, Nauka u kriznim uslovima, zbornik radova, str. 76–81, Udruženje Nauka i društvo, Pristina 1993.
- "Кosovo i Мetohiјa kraјem devedesetih - stavovi albanskih intelektualaca", saopštenje na naučnom skupu "Јugoslovensko društvo kraјem devedestih" održanom 29–30. septembra 1995. Godine u Beogradu, Јugoslovensko društvo kraјem devedestih, zbornik radova, str. 173–183, Sociološko društvo Srbiјe, Belgrade, 1996.
- Isti rad: "Kosovo and Metohija In The Late ‘90s, the Attitudes Of Albanian Intellectuals (Preliminari Results), Sociologiјa, 4/1995, str. 555-566, Belgrade.
- "Autobiography in a research of the traditional forms of marriage.The Case Study of the Autobiography of a Cheated Husband ", rezime rada prihvaćenog za izlaganje na European Sociological Association Conference, University of Esseh, August 27–30, 1997.
- "Оpstaјanje tradicionalnih oblika braka kod Albanaca na Kosovu I Metohiji", Sociološki pregled, 1997, br.3, str. 359–385.

Among other things, her scientific work includes research of sociological and anthropological types in Kosovo, sponsored by the Gallup Institute.

== Affiliations ==
Mrs. Djuric is a member of a number of international and domestic scientific associations (YUS, SDS, ESA, and ISA), she was a member of the Presidency of Yugoslav Sociological Association, one of the editors of Sociology Magazine. Presently, she is a member of the Presidency of the Serbian Sociological Society.
