= Đorđe Milićević (Vojvodina politician) =

Serbian politician (born 1967)

Đorđe Milićević (Serbian Cyrillic: Ђорђе Милићевић; born 11 December 1967) is a politician in Serbia. He was a vice-president (alternately known as a deputy prime minister) in the government of Vojvodina from 2016 to 2020 and is now serving his third term in the Assembly of Vojvodina. He is a member of the Serbian Progressive Party.

== Early life and career ==
Milićević was born in Bar, in what was then the Socialist Republic of Montenegro in the Socialist Federal Republic of Yugoslavia. He graduated from the University of Novi Sad Faculty of Economics and subsequently worked at the Republic Directorate of Commodity Reserves. In 2004, he began working in Novi Sad's public utility, Zavod za izgradnju Grada. From 2004 to 2008, he served on various working groups and committees of the City Assembly of Novi Sad.

== Politician ==
Milićević was an advisor to the vice-president (i.e., deputy speaker) of the Vojvodina provincial assembly from 2008 to 2012. He received the forty-sixth position on the Progressive Party's coalition electoral list in for the Novi Sad assembly in the 2012 Serbian local elections and was not elected when the list won fifteen mandates.

=== Provincial politics ===
Milićević appeared in the fifth position on the Progressive Party's list in the 2012 Vojvodina provincial election and was elected when the list won fourteen mandates. The election was won by the Democratic Party and its allies, and Milićević served in opposition for the next four years. He was chosen as a deputy speaker of the assembly and held this role from 2012 to 2016.

Vojvodina switched to a system of full proportional representation in the 2016 provincial election. Milićević was given the sixth position on the Progressive Party's list and was re-elected when the list won a majority victory with sixty-three out of 120 seats. The Progressive Party and its allies formed a new government after the election, and Milićević was appointed as a vice-president of the provincial administration, working under Igor Mirović. In 2018, he co-hosted a Vojvodina trade reception in Brussels. The following year, he led a delegation of the Vojvodina government to the Republika Srpska.

He was promoted to the fourth position on the Progressive list in the 2020 provincial election and was elected to a third assembly term when the list won an increased majority with seventy-six seats. He was not re-appointed to government but is now a member of the assembly committee on budget and finance and the assembly committee on security.
