= Igor Đurić =

Igor Đurić may refer to:

- Igor Đurić (Serbian footballer) (born 1985), Serbian football defender
- Igor Djuric (Swiss footballer) (born 1988), Swiss football defender
