= Đorđe Topalović =

Serbian footballer

- Topalović with Esteghlal in 2004

Personal information
- Full name: Đorđe Topalović
- Date of birth: 11 January 1977 (age 49)
- Place of birth: Zemun, SFR Yugoslavia
- Height: 1.92 m (6 ft 4 in)
- Position: Goalkeeper

Senior career*
Years	Team	Apps	(Gls)
1997–2004	Zemun	44	(0)
2004–2005	Esteghlal	23	(0)
2005–2006	Oghab Tehran	22	(0)
2007	OFK Beograd	8	(0)
2008	Vostok	4	(0)
2009–2011	OFK Beograd	6	(0)
Total		107	(0)

International career
1998–1999	FR Yugoslavia U21	3	(0)
- * Club domestic league appearances and goals

Đorđe Topalović (Serbian Cyrillic: Ђорђе Топаловић; born 11 January 1977) is a Serbian retired footballer who played as a goalkeeper.

== Club career ==
Topalović was a member of Zemun for seven seasons (1997–2004). He subsequently went abroad and spent two years in Iran, with Esteghlal and Oghab Tehran. In the 2007 winter transfer window, Topalović returned to his homeland and joined OFK Beograd.

In 2008, Topalović played for Kazakhstan Premier League side Vostok, before returning to OFK Beograd in 2009.

== International career ==
Topalović represented FR Yugoslavia at under-21 level.
