= Olivera Đurđević =

Serbian pianist and university professor

Olivera Đurđević (1928 in Belgrade – 2006) was a Serbian pianist, cembalist and professor at the Faculty of Music in Belgrade.
