= Đorđe Kačunković =

Serbian footballer and coach

Đorđe Kačunković (Serbian Cyrillic: Ђорђе Качунковић; 7 April 1928 - 24 March 1994) was a Serbian footballer and later coach, nicknamed Bata Đole. He was born in Paraćin, Kingdom of Serbs, Croats and Slovenes, and has lived and worked in many cities across Yugoslavia, latter to settle in Pančevo, where he retired and is buried today.

== Biography ==
His playing career was short due to knee injury, and was shattered by WW2 and conscription to the army service. He started playing as a 17-year-old at FK Jedinstvo Paraćin, while serving the army he played for FK Fabrin in Užice, after that he played for smaller teams, until joining FK Radnički Beograd in the Yugoslav First League, where he played as left back and held number 3 on he's back. Afterwards, he signed for NK Proleter Osijek where he met he's future wife Sonja Jovanović, with whom he married in 1956 and stopped he's playing career.

During he's coaching career he has been described as a Big coach of small teams, notable for discovering young talents, that would later go playing in the first league of Yugoslavia and become members of the national team. Teams he has coached are as it follows: FK Pelister, FK Borec, FK FAP, FK Jedinstvo Paraćin, FK Sloboda Užice, FK Jedinstvo Priština, FK Pobeda, FK Voždovac, FK Kumanovo, FK Radnički Niš, FK Srem, FK Jedinstvo Brčko and FK Dinamo Pančevo. He was also the national coach of the amateur football team of Yugoslavia (Olympic team) where he enjoyed success.
