= Đorđe Vlajić =

Serbian footballer and manager

Personal information
- Full name: Đorđe Vlajić
- Date of birth: 8 September 1977 (age 49)
- Place of birth: Belgrade, SFR Yugoslavia
- Position: Midfielder

Team information
- Current team: FK Beograd; Youth coach

Senior career*
Years	Team	Apps	(Gls)
1998–1999	Beograd	23	(13)
1999–2001	Zvezdara	50	(21)
2001–2003	OFK Beograd	21	(0)
2003	Hajduk Beograd	16	(4)
2003–2005	Győri ETO	13	(0)
2005	CFR Cluj	9	(0)
2006	Obilić	8	(0)
2006–2007	Inđija	6	(1)
2007–2008	Hajduk Beograd	34	(7)
2008–2011	Beograd	33	(7)

Managerial career
- 2011–: FK Beograd (youth coach)
- * Club domestic league appearances and goals

Đorđe Vlajić (Serbian Cyrillic: Ђорђе Влајић; born 8 September 1977) is a Serbian football manager and former midfielder.

His career is linked to FK Beograd, the club where he started and finished his playing career, and where, after hanging his boots, he started coaching the youth squads at the club.

During his playing career, he played with FK Zvezdara, OFK Beograd and FK Hajduk Beograd in the First League of FR Yugoslavia, then abroad with Hungarian side Győri ETO and Romanian CFR Cluj, before returning to Serbia where he played with FK Obilić, FK Inđija and FK Hajduk Beograd in the Serbian First League. He finished his career playing with FK Beograd in the Serbian League Belgrade, Serbian third tier.
