= Đorđe Nešić =

Prof. Đorđe Nešić
- Died: Belgrade
- Occupation: Ophthalmologist

Đorđe Nešić (15 June 1873 - 24 October 1959) was a Serbian ophthalmologist.

== Background ==
Nešić was born on 15 June 1873 in Šabac, Serbia, to father Petar and mother Ljubica. The Nešić family moved to Loznica for several years, returning to Šabac when Đorđe was 10. He completed secondary school in 1890 and left to study medicine in Moscow, Russia. Nešić graduated from medical school in 1896.

== Career ==
After graduation, Nešić founded an ophthalmology department at the Belgrade Military Medical Academy. In 1901, he left the Academy to work at the Belgrade General Hospital, where in 1904 he was appointed as head of the ophthalmology department. He had a particular interest in trachoma

Nešić worked as a military ophthalmologist from 1904, including the Russo-Japanese War, Balkan Wars, and World War I. He pursued an academic career, becoming Professor of Ophthalmology and Dean of the Belgrade Faculty of Medicine, before retiring at the age of 82.

== Death ==
Nešić died in Belgrade in 1959 at the age of 86.
