= Sveti Juraj (disambiguation) =

Sveti Juraj (lit. Saint George in Croatian) can refer to several places:

- Sveti Juraj, a village in Lika-Senj County, Croatia
- Sveti Juraj na Bregu, a municipality in Međimurje County, Croatia
- Sveti Juraj u Trnju, a village in Međimurje County, Croatia

It may also refer to:

- Sveti Đorđe Island, an island in the Bay of Kotor in Montenegro, also referred to as Sveti Juraj

== See also ==
- Sveti Jure, the highest peak of Biokovo
