= Đorđe Đikanović =

Montenegrin footballer

Djordje Đikanović
Personal information
- Full name: Đorđe Đikanović
- Date of birth: 18 August 1984 (age 42)
- Place of birth: Nikšić, SFR Yugoslavia
- Height: 1.91 m (6 ft 3 in)
- Position: Defender

Senior career*
Years	Team	Apps	(Gls)
2004–2005	Čelik Nikšić		
2005–2010	Sutjeska Nikšić	46+	(4+)
2008–2009	→ OFK Grbalj (loan)		
2010–2012	Budućnost Podgorica	41	(3)
2013	Čelik Nikšić	14	(0)
2013	Muaither SC	13	(0)
2013–2014	Kukësi	5	(0)
2014–2015	Hajer	23	(0)
- * Club domestic league appearances and goals

Djordje Djikanovic (born 18 August 1984) is a Montenegrin retired footballer who last played as a defender for Hajer Club in the Saudi Professional League.
