= Đorđe Komlenski =

Serbian politician

Đorđe Komlenski (Serbian Cyrillic: Ђорђе Комленски; born 1 February 1965) is a politician in Serbia. He has served in the National Assembly of Serbia since 2016 as a member of the Movement of Socialists.

== Private career ==
Komlenski is a lawyer in private life. He lives in the Belgrade municipality of Obrenovac.

== Politician ==
=== Municipal politics ===
The Movement of Socialists has been aligned with the Serbian Progressive Party since 2010. Komlenski received the eleventh position on the Progressive-led electoral list for the Obrenovac municipal assembly in the 2012 Serbian local elections and was elected when the list won sixteen of fifty-five mandates. The Progressives and their allies initially served in opposition, but they formed a new coalition government in 2014 with the Socialist Party of Serbia and the United Regions of Serbia. When this happened, Komlenski became president (i.e., speaker) of the assembly.

Komlenski received the sixth position on the Progressive-led list in the 2016 and 2020 local elections and was re-elected each time when the list won majority victories.

=== Parliamentarian ===
Komlenski received the twenty-ninth position on the Progressive Party's Aleksandar Vučić – Serbia Is Winning list in the 2016 Serbian parliamentary election and was elected when the coalition won a majority with 131 out of 250 mandates. Following the election, he became the leader of a five-member parliamentary caucus comprising the delegates of the Movement of Socialists, and People's Peasant Party and the United Peasant Party. The caucus supported Serbia's administration led by the Progressive Party.

Komlenski was chosen as chair of the parliamentary committee on constitutional and legislative issues in June 2016 and held this role until the next election. He was also a member of the committee on the judiciary, public administration, and local self-government; a deputy member of the committee on labour, social issues, social inclusion, and poverty reduction; the leader of Serbia's parliamentary friendship group with Venezuela; and a member of its parliamentary friendship groups with Belarus, China, Cuba, Cyprus, the Czech Republic, Greece, Israel, Russia, and Slovakia.

He again received the twenty-ninth position on the Progressive Party's list in the 2020 Serbian parliamentary election and was elected to a second term when the list won a landslide majority with 188 mandates. He now serves in caucus with Progressive Party's Aleksandar Vučić – For Our Children parliamentary group. He is still a member of the judiciary committee, leads the parliamentary friendship groups with North Korea and Venezuela, and serves on the friendship groups with Angola, Austria, Belarus, Bulgaria, China, Cuba, Cyprus, the Czech Republic, Greece, India, Iran, Iraq, Israel, Italy, Kazakhstan, Malta, Moldova, Romania, Russia, Slovenia, Slovakia, and Vietnam.
