= Darko Đurđević =

Serbian footballer

Personal information
- Date of birth: 29 November 1987 (age 38)
- Place of birth: Valjevo, SFR Yugoslavia
- Height: 1.94 m (6 ft 4 in)
- Position: Defensive midfielder

Senior career*
Years	Team	Apps	(Gls)
2005–2007	Krušik Valjevo		
2007	Vujić Voda	2	(0)
2007–2008	Mladost Lučani	5	(0)
2008	Krušik Valjevo		
2008–2009	Mladost Lučani	15	(0)
2009	Sloga Doboj		
2009–2010	Mladost Lučani	15	(0)
2010–2011	Mladi Radnik	11	(0)
2011	Mladost Lučani		
2011	Osečina		
2011–2012	Santa Clara	7	(0)
2012–2013	Železničar Lajkovac		
2013	Mladost Velika Obarska	8	(0)
2014	Budućnost Krušik		
2014-2015	Ribnica		
- * Club domestic league appearances and goals

Darko Đurđević (Serbian Cyrillic: Дарко Ђурђевић, also transliterated Djurdjević; born 29 November 1987) is a Serbian former professional footballer who played as a defensive midfielder.

In the summer of 2011, Djurdjević signed for Portuguese side C.D. Santa Clara. Djurdjević made his debut for the Açoreanos on the 11 September 2011 against Tirsense in a 2012–13 Taça de Portugal second round tie.
