= Đorđe Protić =

Serbian politician (1793–1857)

Đorđe Protić Ђорђе Протић

11th Prime Minister of Serbia
- In office 15 May 1840 – 7 September 1842
- Monarch: Mihailo III
- Preceded by: Paun Janković
- Succeeded by: Avram Petronijević

Minister of Foreign Affairs
- In office 3 May 1840 – 26 October 1842
- Preceded by: Avram Petronijević
- Succeeded by: Aleksa Janković

Personal details
- Born: 1793 Bela Crkva, Habsburg Monarchy
- Died: 7 December 1857 (aged 63–64) Belgrade, Principality of Serbia
- Occupation: politician

Đorđe Protić (Serbian Cyrillic: Ђорђе Протић; 1793 — 7 December 1857) was a Serbian politician and judge.

== Biography ==
Protić was born in Bela Crkva. He was promoted to the rank of major-general. During the rule of Prince Miloš Obrenović, he worked in the judiciary at Kragujevac, then the capital of Serbia, until 1829. He and Avram Petronijević were sent to Constantinople in 1829 to negotiate with the Sublime Porte, according to the Akkerman Convention, the return of six territories (severed from Serbia in 1813), and recognize Serbia's territorial integrity within the Ottoman Empire.

Protić was a member of the council (minister) from 3 February to 17 March 1835; president of the court of the Belgrade district; member of the commission for the preparation of laws from 1837; deputy to the Prince's Representative from 1838; representative (prime minister) and minister for foreign affairs from 3 May 1840 to 26 October 1842. He was in exile from 1842 to 1857.

Government offices
Preceded by Paun Janković	Prime Minister of Serbia; 1840-1842	Succeeded by Avram Petronijević
Preceded by Paun Janković	Minister of Foreign Affairs; 1840-1842	Succeeded by Avram Petronijević
