= Đorđe Bogić =

Serbian Orthodox hieromartyr and saint (1911–1941)

Saint George of Slavonia
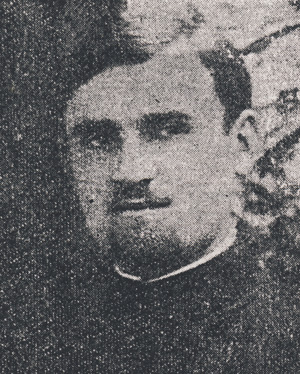
- Photograph of Fr. Bogić c. 1940

New Hieromartyr
- Born: 6 February 1911; Pakrac, Kingdom of Croatia-Slavonia, Austria-Hungary
- Died: 17 June 1941 (aged 30); Našice, Independent State of Croatia
- Cause of death: Death by burning after prolonged torture, including having his ears, nose and tongue cut off and eyes gouged out
- Venerated in: Eastern Orthodox Church
- Canonized: 22 May 1998, Belgrade by the Holy Synod of the Serbian Orthodox Church
- Feast: 17 June (O.S. 4 June)
- Attributes: Vested as a protopresbyter

Georgije Bogić (Cyrillic: Георгије Богић, a.k.a. Đorđe Bogić, Cyrillic: Ђорђе Богић and anglicized as George Bogic; 6 February 1911 – 17 June 1941) was a Serbian Orthodox protopresbyter and the parish priest of the Orthodox church in Našice; who was martyred by the Ustaše during the Second World War, for which he was canonized as Saint George of Slavonia (Serbian: Георгије Славонски, romanized: Georgije Slavonski), being recognised as a new martyr and hieromartyr.

== Life ==
Georgije Bogić was born in Pakrac on 6 February 1911. He completed grammar school in Nova Gradiška and seminary in Sarajevo. On 25 May 1934, he was ordained as a priest in Pakrac. Bogić then performed his duties in the parishes of Majar and Bolmače, after which he was moved to Našice, where he happened to be at the beginning of World War II and the Axis invasion of Yugoslavia.

== Torture and death ==
His afflictions were witnessed by Proko Prejnović, a Serb who hid from the Ustaše in a tree:

The Ustashas tied the priest to a tree before they began their atrocities. They cut off the priest's ears, his nose, and then his tongue. With relish and entirely senselessly, they pulled out his beard and the underlying skin. The poor, exhausted priest cried out of sheer pain. He was still a young man of thirty, healthy and well built. The whole time the priest was resolute and stood upright so that the Ustashas could give free rein to their crudeness. After gouging out his eyes the priest still did not stir so they cut open his stomach and chest so that Bogić collapsed. One could see his heart beating. One of the Ustashas yelled: "Cursed be your Serb mother whose heart is still beating." After this sentence the Ustashas set the priest on fire and shortened his pain and suffering.

According to another witness, the person guilty of these martyr afflictions was a Roman Catholic priest from Našice, Sidonije Šolc: "He (Fra Šolc) had our parish priest Đorđe Bogić killed in the most monstrous manner. They took him out of his apartment in the middle of the night and butchered him.

Bogić's body remained in the same place the whole night, until the afternoon of the next day. Around 4 PM, the local Romani were ordered to take the corpse to Brezik Našički and to bury it in the graveyard.

== Canonization ==
At the regular session of the Holy Synod of the Serbian Orthodox Church in 1998, Protopresbyter Đorđe Bogić was canonized, and his name was entered in the list of names of the saints of the Serbian Orthodox Church.

== See also ==
- List of Serbian saints
- List of Eastern Orthodox saints
