= Đorđe Stojšić (Serbian politician, born 1977) =

Serbian politician

Đorđe Stojšić (Serbian Cyrillic: Ђорђе Стојшић; born 8 July 1977) is a politician in Serbia. He served in the National Assembly of Serbia from 2012 to 2016 and was a member of the Assembly of Vojvodina in 2016. Stojšić is a member of the League of Social Democrats of Vojvodina (LSV).

== Early life and private career ==
Stojšić was born in Belgrade, in what was then the Socialist Republic of Serbia in the Socialist Federal Republic of Yugoslavia. He was raised in Sremska Mitrovica in the Socialist Autonomous Province of Vojvodina and completed high school in the United States of America via the International Education Forum exchange program. He graduated from Wichita State University with a bachelor's degree in business administration and received a second degree in Philosophy. Stojšić returned to Serbia in 2001, was a member of the Vojvođanska banka's board of directors from 2003 to 2004, and joined the board of Blok 67 Associates (Belville) in 2007. He has also been involved in several business ventures.

== Political career ==
An opponent of Serbian nationalism, Stojšić joined the LSV on its formation in 1990 and was an active member of its youth wing until 1995–96, when he left to study in America. He again became involved in the LSV after returning to Serbia, joining its economic council and the executive of its main board. He is currently a party vice-president.

The LSV contested the 2012 Serbian parliamentary election on the Democratic Party's Choice for a Better Life electoral list. Stojšić received the thirty-eighth position on the list and was elected when it won sixty-seven mandates. The Serbian Progressive Party and the Socialist Party of Serbia formed a coalition government after the election, and the LSV served in opposition.

The Democratic Party experienced a serious split in early 2014, when former leader Boris Tadić established a breakaway group initially called the New Democratic Party and later renamed as the Social Democratic Party. The LSV sided with Tadić and contested the 2014 parliamentary election as part of his alliance. Stojšić received the fourteenth position on the new coalition list and was elected to a second term when the list won eighteen mandates. The LSV remained in opposition. In late 2015, Stojšić strongly criticized Hungarian prime minister Viktor Orbán's decision to construct a barbed-wire fence on its borders to with Serbia and Croatia to restrict migration from refugees travelling through these countries.

For the 2016 parliamentary election, the LSV ran on a combined list with the Social Democratic Party and the Liberal Democratic Party. Stojšić received the forty-seventh position on the list. This was too low a position for re-election to be a realistic prospect, and he was not re-elected when the list won only thirteen seats. He was, however, elected to the Assembly of Vojvodina in the concurrent 2016 provincial election; he received the eighth position on the LSV's list and was elected when it won nine mandates. The Progressive Party and its allies won the election, and Stojšić again served as an opposition member.

He resigned from the provincial assembly on 24 November 2016. He has remained active with the LSV, and in September 2017 he represented the party in condemning Serbian Radical Party provincial representative Vojislav Kulačanin for spreading hatred against citizens of Croatian background.
