= Đorđe Bajić (novelist) =

Serbian writer and literary and film critic

- Born: July 21, 1975 (age 51); Belgrade, SFR Yugoslavia
- Occupations: Writer, film critic, literary critic
- Writing career
- Period: c1997–present
- Genres: Horror, Thriller

Đorđe Bajić (Serbian Cyrillic: Ђорђе Бајић; born July 21, 1975) is a Serbian writer, literary and film critic.

== Biography ==
Bajić (1975) was born in Belgrade. He graduated from the Faculty of Philology, Belgrade and obtained master's degree in Art and Media theory (thesis: Noir vs. neo- noir). He publishes film and literature reviews in Serbian press.

=== As a novelist ===
His first novel, a horror adventure Island of the Damned (Ostrvo prokletih), was published in 2010. It became an instant success and got critical acclaim. A couple of years later, he wrote and published two crime-mystery novels featuring the pivotal character of police inspector Nikola Liman – The Yellow Raincoat (Žuta kabanica, 2013) and Another Scumbag Bites the Dust (Jedno đubre manje, 2015). The third of his mysteries, novel Red Snow (Crveni sneg, 2015–2016), was presented to the public in 16 installments via Before After, a Serbian pop-culture and lifestyle portal.
