= Sveti Đorđe =

Sveti Đorđe may refer to:

- Sveti Đorđe, Ulcinj, a village in the municipality of Ulcinj, Montenegro
- Sveti Đorđe Island, an island in the Bay of Kotor, Montenegro
