= Đuraš =

Đuraš (Serbian Cyrillic: Ђураш, also transliterated Djuras) is a Serbian masculine given name, a variant of Đurađ, in turn derived from Greek Georgios ('George').

People with the given name include:

- Đuraš Ilijić (fl. 1326–62), Serbian nobleman
- Đuraš Vrančić (fl. 1300s), Serbian nobleman

== See also ==
- Đurašević, surname
- Đurašić, surname
