= Đorđe Glišović =

Serbian footballer

Personal information
- Full name: Đorđe Glišović
- Date of birth: 13 February 1995 (age 31)
- Place of birth: Čajetina, FR Yugoslavia
- Height: 1.92 m (6 ft 3 1/2 in)
- Position: Centre-back

Team information
- Current team: Sloboda Užice
- Number: 13

Youth career
- Zlatibor Čajetina
- Jedinstvo Užice

Senior career*
Years	Team	Apps	(Gls)
2013–2017	Jedinstvo Užice	55	(1)
2017–2018	Sloga Požega		
2018	Jagodina Tabane		
2019–2021	Sloga Požega		
2022–	Sloboda Užice	52	(0)
- * Club domestic league appearances and goals as of 26 May 2024

Đorđe Glišović (Serbian Cyrillic: Ђорђе Глишовић; born 13 February 1995) is a Serbian football defender who plays for Sloboda Užice.

== Club career ==
Born in Čajetina, Glišović played with Zlatibor Čajetina and Jedinstvo Užice in his youth career. He joined the first team of Jedinstvo in 2013–14 season, but also stayed with youth team until the end of season. He noted his first senior caps during the 2014–15 season, making four Serbian First League appearances. At the beginning of 2015–16 season, Glišović played cup matches against Zemun and Čajetina, and later, during the season, he played mostly matches as a defender. He also played all 15 matches in the Serbian League West, during the first half of 2016–17 season, scoring a goal in the second fixture match against Budućnost Krušik 2014. In the winter break off-season, Glišović was related with returning to Zlatibor, but he continued playing with Jedinstvo.

== Career statistics ==
As of 19 March 2017

Club	Season	League			Cup		Continental		Other		Total	
Club	Season	Division	Apps	Goals	Apps	Goals	Apps	Goals	Apps	Goals	Apps	Goals
Jedinstvo Užice	2013–14	Serbian First League	0	0	0	0	—		—		0	0
Jedinstvo Užice	2014–15	Serbian First League	4	0	0	0	—		—		4	0
Jedinstvo Užice	2015–16	Serbian League West	24	0	1	0	—		1 (Note: Appearance in OFS Užice Cup)	0	25	0
Jedinstvo Užice	2016–17	Serbian League West	27	1	—		—		—		27	1
Jedinstvo Užice	Total		55	1	1	0	—		1	0	57	1
