= Guiding Star =

Guiding Star or guiding star may refer to:

- Guiding Star (play), a 1998 play by Jonathan Harvey (playwright)
- "Guiding Star" (song), a single by the British group Cast
- SS Guiding Star, an American troopship in service 1944–73
- Guiding Star (2007 album) by Vusi Mahlasela.
- Guiding Star Grange, a Grange Hall building in Greenfield, Massachusetts, United States
- Guiding Stars, a nutrient density rating system

Guide star may refer to:

- Guide star, a reference star used to accurately maintain the tracking by a telescope of a heavenly body
- GuideStar, an information website reporting on U.S. nonprofit companies

== See also ==
- Lodestar (disambiguation)
- Cynosure
