= List of rolling stock items in the UK National Collection =

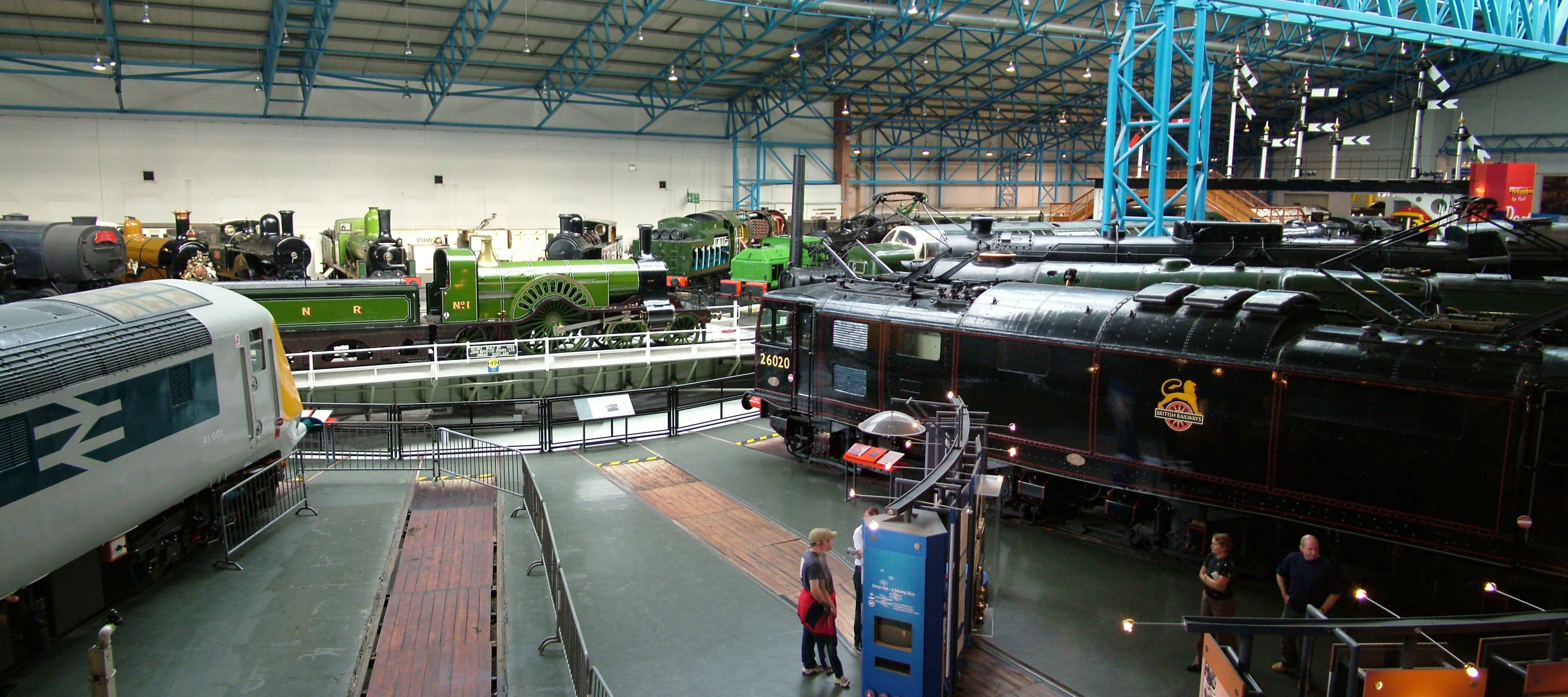
Locomotives from the National Collection in the Great Hall of the UK National Railway Museum.

The UK National Collection is a collection of around 280 historic rail vehicles (predominantly of British origin). The majority of the collection is kept at four national museums:

- National Railway Museum, York
- Locomotion, Shildon
- Science Museum, Kensington, London
- Science and Industry Museum, Manchester

Other items are on short or long-term loans to museums and heritage railways such as the Museum of the Great Western Railway at Swindon and the Head of Steam museum at Darlington.

== Steam locomotives ==
=== Standard gauge designs up to 1869 ===
These locomotives are all 4 ft 8 1/2 in (1,435 mm) gauge unless noted otherwise.

Railway	Number and name	Type or Class	Builder	Works Number	Built	Wheels	Location	Object Number	Image
S&D	Locomotion No. 1		R Stephenson	3	1825	0-4-0	Shildon	1978–7010	
Shutt End Colliery	Agenoria		Foster, Rastrick and Company		1829	0-4-0	York	1884–92	
L&M	Rocket		R Stephenson	19	1829	0-2-2	York	1862-5	
S&D	Rocket	Replica			1935 (Note: Sectionalised replica of original Rocket of 1829.)	0-2-2	York	1935–87	
S&D	Rocket	Replica	Locomotion Enterprises (1975) Ltd.	2	1979 (Note: Working replica of original Rocket of 1829.)	0-2-2	Shildon	1979–7002	
L&M	Sans Pareil		Timothy Hackworth		1829	0-4-0	Shildon	1864-45	
L&M	Sans Pareil	Replica			1979 (Note: Working replica of original Sans Pareil.)	0-4-0	Shildon	2009–7054	
L&M	Novelty	Replica, features original cylinder and wheel parts.	Ericsson and Braithwaite		1929 (Note: Novelty was rebuilt in 1929)	0-2-2	Manchester	1929-866	
L&M	9 Planet	Replica	Science and Industry Museum		1992 (Note: Working replica of original Planet of 1830)	2-2-0	Manchester	YD1995.128	
Hetton Colliery	Bradyll		Timothy Hackworth		c. 1837	0-6-0	Shildon	2008–7058	
S&D	18 Etherley				1840	(Note: Only the tender of Etherley remains)	Shildon	1981-426	
S&D	25 Derwent		Kitching		1845	0-6-0	Darlington	1978–7012	
Hetton Colliery	Lyon				1852	0-4-0	Shildon	1978–7009	
GJR	Columbine (Note: Columbine was built as number 49 of the Grand Junction Railway but is preserved in later guise as number 1868 of the London and North Western Railway.)		GJR Crewe		1845	2-2-2	York	1975–7016	
Furness	3 Coppernob		Bury, Curtis, and Kennedy		1846	0-4-0	York	1975–7015	
LNWR	3020 Cornwall (Note: Cornwall was originally numbered 173 but is preserved with its later number 3020.)		LNWR Crewe		1847	2-2-2	Quainton Road	1975–7026	
Sandy and Potton (Note: Shannon was built for the Sandy and Potton Railway and later worked on the Cromford and High Peak Railway and Wantage Tramway.)	5 Shannon		George England and Co.		1858	0-4-0WT	Didcot	1978–7013	
LNWR	1439	4ft shunter	Crewe		1865	0-4-0ST	Preston	1978–7015	
MR	158A	156 Class	MR Derby		1866	2-4-0	Barrow Hill	1978–7016	
NER	66 Aerolite (Note: North Eastern Railway 66 was later renumbered 1478.)	X1 (LNER)	NER Gateshead		1869	2-2-4T	Shildon	1975–7013	

=== Standard gauge designs 1870 to 1899 ===
These locomotives are all 4 ft 8 1/2 in (1,435 mm) gauge.

Railway	Number and name	Type or Class	Builder	Works Number	Built	Wheels	Location	Object Number	Image
GNR	1	Stirling Single	GNR Doncaster		1870	4-2-2	York	1975–7014	
LSWR	30587 (BR (Note: The Beattie Well tank was built by Beyer Peacock in 1874 for the London and South Western Railway. It initially carried the number 298 but this was later changed to 0298 in a duplicate series and was rebuilt at their Eastleigh Works in 1921. When it became the property of the Southern Railway it initially carried the number E0298 but this was changed to 3298. It is preserved in British Railways guise with its final number 30587.))	0298 Class ("Beattie Well Tank")	Beyer Peacock	1412	1874	2-4-0WT	Bodmin	1978–7018	
Hebburn Works	2 Bauxite		Black, Hawthorn	305	1874	0-4-0ST	York	1953-354	
NER	1275	1001 Class	Dübs	708	1874	0-6-0	York	1975–7009	
NER	910	901 Class	NER Gateshead		1875	2-4-0	Shildon	1975–7004	
LBSCR	82 Boxhill (Note: Boxhill was originally numbered 82 but this was later changed to 682. On transfer to the Southern railway this became 380S in their Service Stock series.)	A1 Class (Terrier)	LBSCR Brighton		1880	0-6-0T	York	1975–7012	
LBSCR	214 Gladstone (Note: Gladstone was originally numbered 214 but was renumbered 618. Upon transfer to the Southern Railway this became B618.)	B1 Class	LBSCR Brighton		1882	0-4-2	York	1975–7017	
NER	1463	1463 Class	NER Darlington		1885	2-4-0	Darlington	1975–7020	
LYR	1008 (Note: Lancashire and Yorkshire Railway 1008 was numbered 10621 by the London Midland and Scottish Railway, and 50621 by British Railways.)	Class 5	LYR Horwich	1	1889	2-4-2T	Bury	1976–7003	
LNWR	790 Hardwicke (Note: Hardwicke was London North Western Railway 790 and then London Midland and Scottish Railway 5031.)	Improved Precedent	LNWR Crewe	3286	1892	2-4-0	Shildon	1975–7023	
S&MR	1 Gazelle		Alfred Dodman & Co.		1893	0-4-2WT	Tenterden	1975–7010	
NER	1621	M1 Class (LNER D17/1)	NER Gateshead		1893	4-4-0	Shildon	1975–7008	
GNR	1002 (Only tender survives, now coupled to No.1)	Stirling Single			1893	(Note: Only the tender of Stirling Single 1002 survives. It has been attached to Single No. 1 since 2014.)	York	1978–7122	
GER	GER 490; BR 62785 (Note: T26 Class 490 was built for the Great Eastern Railway. The London and North Eastern Railway gave it the number 7490 in 1923 but later changed this to 2785, so for British Railways it was number 62785.)	T26 Class (LNER E4)	GER Stratford	836	1894	2-4-0	Bressingham	1975–7002	
LSWR	LSWR 245 (Note: M7 Class 245 was numbered E245 by the Southern Railway but later reverted to plain 245; under British Railways ownership it carried number 30245.)	M7 Class	LSWR Nine Elms	—	1897	0-4-4T	York	1978–7020	
GWR	2516	2301 Class (Dean Goods)	GWR Swindon	1557	1897	0-6-0	Swindon	1978–7021	
TVR	TVR 28 (Note: Taff Vale Railway number 28 became 450 in Great Western Railway ownership.)	O1 Class	TVR Cardiff	306	1897	0-6-2T	Gwili	1978–7022	
GNR	990 Henry Oakley (Note: Henry Oakley was renumbered 3990 by the London and North Eastern Railway.)	Class C1 (small boiler) (LNER C2)	GNR Doncaster	708	1898	4-4-2	York	1975–7001	
MR	673 (Note: Midland Railway 673 had earlier carried number 118.)	115 Class	MR Derby		1899	4-2-2	York	1978–7023	
GNR	1247 (Note: Great Northern Railway 1247 became 4247 under London and North Eastern Railway ownership. This was later changed to 8846 so it became British Railway's 68846.)	Class J13 (LNER J52)	Sharp Stewart	4492	1899	0-6-0ST	York	1980–7001	
LSWR	30120 (Note: T9 number 120 became Southern Railway's E120 before reverting to 120. For British Railways it was renumbered 30120.)	T9 Class	LSWR Nine Elms	—	1899	4-4-0	Swanage	1978–7024	

=== Standard gauge designs 1900 to 1922 ===
These locomotives are all 4 ft 8 1/2 in (1,435 mm) gauge unless noted otherwise.

Railway	Number and name	Type or Class	Builder	Works Number	Built	Wheels	Location	Object Number	Image
SECR	737 (Note: South Eastern and Chatham Railway 737 became Southern Railway A737 before renumbering to 1737. Under British Railways it was number 31737.)	D Class	SECR Ashford		1901	4-4-0	York	1975–7006	
MR	1000 (Note: Midland Railway 1000 was originally numbered 2361. Under British Railways it was number 41000.)	1000 Class	MR Derby		1902 (Note: Midland Railway 1000 was rebuilt in 1914.)	4-4-0	Barrow Hill	1975–7018	
GNR	251 (Note: Great Northern Railway 251 became London and North Eastern Railway 3251 before renumbering to 2800.)	C1 Class (large boiler) (LNER C1)	GNR Doncaster	991	1902	4-4-2	Doncaster	1975–7005	
GWR	3440 City of Truro (Note: City of Truro carried number 3717 for a time.)	3700 Class ("City")	GWR Swindon	2000	1903	4-4-0	Swindon	1978–7025	
GER	87 (Note: Great Eastern Railway 877 became London and North Eastern Railway 7087 before renumbering to 8633. Under British Railways it was number 68633.)	S56 Class (LNER J69)	GER Stratford	1249	1904	0-6-0T	Bressingham	1975–7003	
GER	1217 (Note: Great Eastern Railway 1217 became London and North Eastern Railway 8217 before renumbering to 5567. Under British Railways it was number 65567.)	G58 Class (LNER J17)	GER Stratford		1905	0-6-0	Barrow Hill	1978–7026	
GWR	4003 Lode Star	4000 Class ("Star")	Swindon Works	2231	1907	4-6-0	York	1978–7027	
LTSR	80 Thundersley (Note: 80 Thundersley became Midland Railway 2177. It retained this number with the London Midland and Scottish Railway but was later renumbered to 2148. Under British Railways it was number 41966.)	79 Class	Stephenson	3367	1909	4-4-2T	Bressingham	1978–7028	
Longmoor	Woolmer		Avonside	1572	1910	0-6-0ST	Basingstoke	2008–7159	
GCR	63601 (BR) (Note: 63601 was originally Great Central Railway 102. It became London and North Eastern Railway 5102 before renumbering to 3509.)	8K Class (LNER O4)	GCR Gorton		1911	2-8-0	Loughborough	1975–7027	
NER	901 (Note: North Eastern Railway 901 retained its number with the London and North Eastern Railway for many years but was eventually renumbered as 3460. Under British Railways it was number 63460.)	T3 Class (LNER Q7)	NER Darlington		1919	0-8-0	Shildon	1978–7029	
GCR	506 Butler Henderson (Note: Butler Henderson became London and North Eastern Railway 5506 before being renumbered as 2660. Under British Railways it was number 62660.)	11F Class (LNER D11)	GCR Gorton		1920	4-4-0	Barrow Hill	1978–7030	
LNWR	49395 (BR) (Note: 49395 was originally London and North Western Railway 485, later Midland Railway 9395.)	Class G2	LNWR Crewe	5662	1921	0-8-0	Shildon	1978–7031	

=== Standard gauge designs 1923 to 1947 ===
These locomotives are all 4 ft 8 1/2 in (1,435 mm) gauge unless noted otherwise.

Railway	Number and name	Type or Class	Builder	Works Number	Built	Wheels	Location	Object Number	Image
GWR	4073 Caerphilly Castle	4073 Class ("Castle")	GWR Swindon		1923	4-6-0	Swindon	1961–76	
LNER	60103 Flying Scotsman (Note: Flying Scotsman was originally numbered 4472 but later carried the numbers 502 then 103. British Railways numbered it 60103.)	A3 Class	LNER Doncaster	1564	1923	4-6-2	York/Mainline	2004–7103	
LMS	4027 (Note: LMS 4027 was numbered 44027 by British Railways.)	4F	LMS Derby	—	1924	0-6-0	Sharpness	1978–7033	
SR (LSWR)	777 Sir Lamiel (Note: Sir lamiel was numbered 30777 by British Railways.)	N15 (King Arthur) Class	North British	23223	1925	4-6-0	Loughborough	1978–7034	
LMS	13000 (Note: LMS 13000 was later numbered 2700 and then in British Railways ownership it became 42700.)	5MT ("Crab")	LMS Horwich	—	1926	2-6-0	York	1978–7036	
SR	850 Lord Nelson (Note: Lord Nelson was numbered 30850 by British Railways.)	Lord Nelson	SR Easteligh	—	1926	4-6-0	Ropley	1978–7035	
GWR	6000 King George V	6000 Class ("King")	GWR Swindon		1927	4-6-0	Swindon	1978–7037	
SR	925 Cheltenham (Note: Cheltenham was numbered 30925 by British Railways.)	V ("Schools")	SR Eastleigh	—	1934	4-4-0	York	1978–7038	
LMS	2500 (Note: LMS 2500 was numbered 42500 by British Railways.)	4MT	LMS Derby	—	1934	2-6-4T	Bury	1978–7039	
Chinese Government Railways	KF7 (Note: Chinese Government Railways KF7 was renumbered 607.)	KF1 Class	Vulcan	4674	1935	4-8-4	York	1987–7001	
LMS	5000 (Note: LMS 5000 was numbered 45000 by British Railways.)	5MT	LMS Crewe	216	1935	4-6-0	Shildon	1978–7040	
LNER	4771 Green Arrow (Note: Green Arrow was originally numbered 4771 but later carried number 800 before becoming British Railways' 60800.)	V2 Class	LNER Doncaster	1837	1936	2-6-2	Doncaster	1975–7025	
LNER	4468 Mallard (Note: Mallard was originally number 4468 but was renumbered as 22 before becoming British Railways' 60022.)	A4 Class	LNER Doncaster	1870	1938	4-6-2	York	1975–7007	
LMS	6229 Duchess of Hamilton (Note: Duchess of Hamilton was numbered 46229 by British Railways.)	"Princess Coronation"	LMS Crewe	—	1938	4-6-2	York	1976–7000	
SR	C1 (Note: The Q1 Class 0-6-0 carried the number C1 when built but was numbered 33001 by British Railways.)	Q1	SR Brighton		1942	0-6-0	York	1978–7041	
SR	34051 Winston Churchill (Note: Sir Winston Churchill was numbered 21C151 by the Southern Railway and 34051 by British Railways.)	Battle of Britain	SR Brighton		1946	4-6-2	Shildon	1978–7042	
GWR	9400	9400 Class	GWR Swindon Works		1947	0-6-0PT	Swindon	1978–7043	
BR (SR) (Note: Ellerman Lines was built by British Railways to an earlier Southern Railway design. It has been sectioned to show its construction.)	35029 Ellerman Lines	Merchant Navy	SR Eastleigh		1949	4-6-2	York	1975–7021	

=== Standard gauge designs from 1948 onwards ===
These locomotives are all 4 ft 8 1/2 in (1,435 mm) gauge unless noted otherwise.

Railway	Number	Type or Class	Builder	Works Number	Built	Wheels	Location	Object Number	Image
BR	70013 Oliver Cromwell	7MT ("Britannia")	BR Crewe		1951	4-6-2	Loughborough	1978–7044	
Industrial (Note: The Barclay fireless locomotive was owned by Imperial Paper Mills.)	1		Barclay	2373	1956	0-4-0F	Shildon	1978–7045	
Industrial (Note: Frank Galbraith was owned by the Teesside Bridge & Engineering Co.)	5 Frank Galbraith		Sentinel	9629	1957	0-4-0 VBT	Hull	1981–7000	
BR	92220 Evening Star	9F	BR Swindon	—	1960	2-10-0	York	1975–7024	

=== Narrow gauge steam locomotives ===
Railway	Number or name	Type or Class	Builder	Works Number	Built	Wheels	Gauge	Location	Object Number	Image
LNWR	Pet		LNWR Crewe		1865	0-4-0ST	18 in (457 mm)	York	1978–7014	
IoMR	3 Pender		Beyer, Peacock	1255	1873	2-4-0T	3 ft (914 mm)	Manchester	Y1980.12	
Ffestiniog Railway	Livingston Thompson	Double Fairlie	Boston Lodge		1885	0-4-4-0T	1 ft 11 1/2 in (597 mm)	York	1990–7368 (loan from Ffestiniog Railway)	
LYR	Wren		Beyer, Peacock	2825	1887	0-4-0ST+T	18 in (457 mm)	Bury	1975–7019	
Cape Govt.	993 (Note: The South African Railways Class 7A carries its SAR number 993, but when built for the Cape Government Railways it was numbered 390.)	SAR 7A	Sharp, Stewart	4150	1896	4-8-0	3 ft 6 in (1,067 mm)	York	2005–7445	
SAR	2352	SAR GL	Beyer, Peacock	6639	1929	4-8-2+2-8-4	3 ft 6 in (1,067 mm)	Manchester	Y1984.873	

=== Broad gauge ===
Railway	Name	Type or Class	Builder	Works Number	Built	Wheels	Gauge	Location	Object Number	Image
Wylam Colliery	Puffing Billy		William Hedley		1813; Rebuilt c.1830	4w VCG	5 ft (1,524 mm)	Kensington	1862-2	
SDR	Tiny (Note: The South Devon Railway was absorbed by the Great Western Railway in 1876 and Tiny was then allocated number 2180.)	Vertical boiler	Sara and Company		1868	0-4-0T	7 ft 1/4 in (2,140 mm)	Buckfastleigh	1978–7017	
NWR	3157		Vulcan Foundry	2764	1911	4-4-0	5 ft 6 in (1,676 mm)	Manchester	Y1982.2	
GWR	North Star	Star (replica)	GWR Swindon		1925 (Note: The North Star replica includes some parts from 1837 original.)	2-2-2	7 ft 1/4 in (2,140 mm)	Swindon	1978–7011	
GWR	Iron Duke	Iron Duke (replica)	Resco Railways		1985 (Note: Iron Duke is a replica of a GWR locomotive built in 1847.)	4-2-2	7 ft 1/4 in (2,140 mm)	Didcot	1985–1989	

== Electric locomotives ==
=== Standard gauge ===
Railway	Number (current)	Type or Class	Builder	Works Number	Built	Wheels	Location	Object Number	Image
C&SLR	13		Mather & Platt / Beyer, Peacock		1890	Bo	LT Museum	1923-301	
Waterloo & City	75S (Note: Southern Railway 75S was numbered DS75 by British railways.)		Siemens Brothers & Co	6	1898	Bo	Shildon	1978–7003	
NER	1 (Note: North Eastern Railway electric locomotive number 1 was renumbered 4075 and then 6480 by the London and North Eastern railway. Under British Railways numbering it carried 26500.)	(BR) ES1	BTH		1904	Bo-Bo	Shildon	1975–7022	
NSR	1 (Note: North Staffordshire Railway battery electric locomotive no. 1 later carried British Railways number BEL2.)	Battery-electric	NSR / Thomas Bolton		1917	Bo	Shildon	1978–7004	
CEGB	(Note: The CEGB Bolton battery electric locomotive originally entered service with the South Wales Electrical Power Distribution Co. at Upper Boat power station, where it was registered as no. 258 to work on the Great Western Railway.)	Battery-electric	EE	1378	1944	Bo	East Lancashire Railway	Plant	
BR	E26020 (Note: Locomotive E26020 later carried the TOPS number 76020.)	Class 76	BR Gorton	1027	1951	Bo-Bo	York	1978–7005	
BR	1505 Ariadne (Note: Locomotive 1505 originally carried the number 27001, prior to its sale to Nederlandse Spoorwegen in 1969)	Class 77 (NS 1500)	BR Gorton	1066	1954	Co-Co	Manchester	Y1987.207	
BR	E5001 (Note: Locomotive E5001 later carried the TOPS number 71001.)	Class 71	BR Doncaster	—	1958	Bo-Bo	Shildon	1978–7006	
BR	84001 (Note: Locomotive 84001 originally carried the number E3036.)	Class 84	North British	27793	1960	Bo-Bo	York	1979–7001	
BR	87001 Stephenson / Royal Scot	Class 87	BREL Crewe	—	1973	Bo-Bo	York	2005–7698	

=== Narrow gauge electric ===
Railway	Number	Type or Class	Builder	Works Number	Built	Wheels	Gauge	Location	Object Number	Image
Channel Tunnel Construction	RA36	4wBE/WE	Hunslet	9423	1990		900 mm (2 ft 11 7/16 in)	York	1992–7394	

=== Electric multiple units coaches ===
All these coaches are 4 ft 8 1/2 in (1,435 mm) gauge unless noted otherwise.

Railway	Unit number	Unit type or class	Car number	Car type	Builder	Built	Location	Object Number	Image
North Eastern Railway		Electric unit	3267	Parcels		1904	North Shields	1978–7067	
Southern Railway	1293	405 (4-SUB)	8143		Eastleigh Works	1925	York	1978–7069	
Southern Railway	3131	404 (4-COR)	11179	MBTO	Lancing Carriage Works (underframes); Eastleigh Works (bodywork)	1937	Shildon	1978–7071	
London & North Western Railway		LNWR electric	28249	MBTO	Metropolitan Cammell	1915	York	1978–7068	
Southern Railway	2090	401 (2-BIL)	12123	MBT	Southern Railway	1937	Shildon	1985–7001	
Southern Railway	2090	401 (2-BIL)	10656	DTC	Southern Railway	1937	Shildon	1985–7002	
Southern Region of British Railways	4308	414 (2-HAP)	61275	DMBSO	Eastleigh Works	1958	Shildon	2010-7198/1	
Southern Region of British Railways	4308	414 (2-HAP)	75395	DTC	Eastleigh Works	1958	Shildon	2010-7198/2	
Eastern Region of British Railways	306017	Class 306	65217; 65417; 65617	DMSO; TBSO; DTSO	Birmingham Railway Carriage & Wagon Company; Metro-Cammell	1949	Shildon	2010–7263	
JR-West	H94→Q2	0 Series Shinkansen	22–141	Panto/Cab	Hitachi	1976	York	2001–7500	
Eurostar International		Class 373	373308	Power Car	GEC-Alsthom	1994	York	2019–359	

=== Electric tramcars ===
Railway	Number	Class or Type	Builder	Works Number	Built	Wheels	Location	Object Number	Image
Glasgow Corporation (Note: 4 ft 7 3/4 in (1,416 mm) gauge.)	585	Standard	Glasgow Corporation		1901	Single truck	Wroughton (store)	1962-356	

== Internal combustion ==
=== Standard gauge locomotives ===
The following locomotives are all 4 ft 8 1/2 in (1,435 mm) gauge and powered by diesel engines unless noted otherwise.

Railway	Number	Type or Class	Builder	Works Number	Built	Wheels	Location	Object Number	Image
Industrial		Petrol	Motor Rail	4217	1925	4wPM	Shildon	1987-7000	
CEGB	D21 Hexhamshire	Diesel electric	Armstrong Whitworth	D21	1933	0-4-0	Shildon	1978–7008	
LMS	7050	Diesel mechanical	Drewry/EE	Drewry 2047; EE 874	1934	0-4-0	York	2008–7160	
BR	13079 (Note: Diesel shunter 13079 was renumbered D3079 but later carried TOPS number 08064.)	Class 08	BR Darlington	—	1953	0-6-0	Shildon	1985–7000	
BR	08911 (Note: Diesel shunter 08911 was originally numbered D4141.)	Class 08	BR Horwich	—	1962	0-6-0	Shildon	Plant	
EE	DP1 Deltic	Prototype	EE	2007	1955	Co-Co	Shildon	1963–80	
BR	D8000 (Note: D8000 later carried TOPS number 20050.)	Class 20	EE/Vulcan	EE 2347 VF D375	1957	Bo-Bo	York	1981–7002	
BR	31018 (Note: D5500 later carried TOPS number 31018.)	Class 31/0	Brush	71	1957	A1A-A1A	Shildon	1978–7000	
BR	D200 (Note: D200 later carried TOPS number 40122.)	Class 40	EE/Vulcan	EE 2367 VF D395	1958	1Co-Co1	Shildon	1988–7001	
Industrial	H001	Diesel hydraulic	Sentinel	10003	1959	4wDH	Shildon	2009–7090	
BR	D2090 (Note: D2090 later carried TOPS number 03090.)	Class 03	BR Doncaster	—	1960	0-6-0	Gwili	1976–7005	
BR	D6535 (Note: D6535 was converted to a Class 33/1 in 1967 and later carried the TOPS number 33116.)	Class 33/1	BRC&W	DEL 127	1960	Bo-Bo	Loughborough	2005–7286	
BR	D2860	Class 02	Yorkshire Engine Co.	2843	1961	0-4-0	York	1978–7001	
BR	D6700 (Note: D6700 later carried TOPS number 37119 until modified to Class 37/3 when it became 37350.)	Class 37	EE/Vulcan	EE 2863 VF D579	1961	Co-Co	Loughborough	2001–7861	
BR	D9002 Kings Own Yorkshire Light Infantry (Note: D9002 later carried TOPS number 55002.)	Class 55	EE/Vulcan	EE 2907 VF D559	1961	Co-Co	York	1987–7002	
BR	09017	Class 09	Horwich Works	—	1961	0-6-0	York	Plant	
BR	D1023 Western Fusilier	Class 52	BR Swindon	—	1963	C-C	Didcot	1978–7002	
BR	47798 Prince William (Note: Class 47 locomotive number D1656 became 47072 in 1974 after the TOPS numbering system came into use. Its steam heating boiler was replaced by electric train heating in 1984 and therefore renumbered 47609. The following year it was given the name Fire Fly to commemorate an historic Great Western Railway steam locomotive and was further renmubered to 47834 in 1989. In 1995 it was renumbered once more to 47798 and the name changed to Prince William; it was also repainted in claret colour as one of the locomotives allocated to pull the British Royal Train.)	Class 47	BR Crewe	—	1965	Co-Co	Nemesis Rail	2004–7243	
BR	41001 (Note: 41001 was one of the two power cars of the prototype High Speed Diesel Train which, as a complete train, carried the number 252001. It carried car number 43000 and later ADB975812 when no longer in revenue service.)	Class 41 (Note: The Class 41 was the prototype for the InterCity 125 or "High Speed Train".)	BREL Crewe	—	1972	Bo-Bo	Shildon	1988–7000	
BR	43002 Sir Kenneth Grange	Class 43	BREL Crewe	—	1975	Bo-Bo	York	2020-105	
BR	43102 The Journey Shrinker	Class 43	BREL Crewe	—	1978	Bo-Bo	Shildon	2021–966	

=== Narrow gauge locomotives ===
These locomotives are all powered by diesel engines unless noted otherwise.

Railway	Number	Type	Builder	Works Number	Built	Wheels	Gauge	Location	Object Number	Image
Yorkshire Water Authority (Note: Simplex 2275 worked at Knostrop Sewage Works but was originally built for the War Department Light Railways.)	Simplex No 2275	Petrol	Motor Rail	1377	1918	4wPM	2 ft (610 mm)	Leighton Buzzard		
Yorkshire Water Authority (Note: Ruston Hornsby 187105 was used by the Yorkshire water Authority at Naburn Sewage Works.)			Ruston Hornsby	187105	1937	4wDM	2 ft (610 mm)	Leighton Buzzard	1978–7046	
NCB (Note: Number 14 was operated by the National Coal Board at Ellington Colliery, Northumberland.)	14		Hudswell Clarke	DM1274	1962	0-6-0DM	3 ft (914 mm)	Shildon	2005–7601	
NCB (Note: Number 9 was operated by the National Coal Board at Ellington Colliery, Northumberland.)	9		Hunslet	9227	1986	Bo-Bo	3 ft (914 mm)	Shildon	2005–7600	

=== Diesel multiple unit coaches ===
All these coaches are 4 ft 8 1/2 in (1,435 mm) gauge and power by diesel engines unless noted otherwise.

Railway	Number	Class or Type	Builder	Works Number	Built	Location	Object Number	Image
GWR	4	Railcar	AEC		1934	York	1978–7070	
BR	51562 + 51922	2-car Class 108	BR Derby		1959–1960	Barrow Hill	1993–7000	
BR	51192 + 54352	2-car Class 101	Metro Cammell		1957–1958	NNR	2004–7105	
BR	APT-E	Gas turbine prototype APT	BR Derby		1970	Shildon	1976–7002	
BR	LEV1	Experimental railbus	Leyland		1975	Shildon	1987–7017	
BR	142001 (55542 + 55592)	2-car Class 142	BR Derby		1985	Shildon	2020–106	

== Coaching stock ==
Railway	Number	Type	Builder	Diagram and lot no.	Built	Location	Object Number	Image
B&WR		Four-wheel composite			1834	York	1975–7037	
B&WR		Four-wheel second			1834	York	1975–7038	
B&WR		Four-wheel open third			1834	York	1975–7039	
L&BR	2	Four-wheel Royal Saloon	Underframe (Euston Works) Body (Carriage builder in Gough Street)		1842	York	1983–7001	
M&BR	1	Four-wheel first	Wright and Sons		1844	Manchester	Y1993.101	
S&DR	31	Four-wheel 1st & 2nd comp	Horner & Wilkinson		1846	Shildon	1975–7034	
S&DR	59	Four-wheel 1st & 2nd comp	Tweeddale Barton		1847	Shildon	1975–7041	
ECR	64	Four-wheel first			1852	York	1978–7054	
NBR	1	Horse-drawn "Dandy Car"	NBR, St Margarets, Edinburgh	Dia 117	1856	York	1975–7058	
Cornwall Railway	5	Broad gauge third (body section)			1859 or 1865?	Wroughton (store)	1995–7788	
LNWR	802	12-wheel Royal Saloon (two 6w bodies as one)	Wolverton		1869, 1895 (rebuilt to 12w)	York	1983–7002	
NLR	32	Four-wheel Directors' Saloon	Bow		1872	Shildon	1975–7029	
MR	901	Six-wheel composite	Derby	Dia No. 516, Lot no. 111	1885	York	1975–7033	
Lynton and Barnstaple Railway	2	1 ft 11 1/2 in (597 mm) gauge Brake comp/Obs saloon	Bristol		1897	York	1988–7002	
ECJS	12	Clerestory Corridor Third	York	Dia No. 18, 14	1898	Shildon	1978–7056	
WCJS (LNWR)	200	Twelve-wheel 1st class Dining	Wolverton	Dia No. LNW29	1900	Shildon	1975–7032	
LNWR	800	Twelve-wheel Royal Saloon	Wolverton		1902	York	1983–7004	
LNWR	801	Twelve-wheel Royal Saloon	Wolverton		1902	Shildon	1983–7003	
LSWR	847	Tri-comp Lavatory Brake	Eastleigh	Dia No. 69, Lot No. 1190	1903	York	1978–7057	
LNWR	303	Brake First Corridor	Wolverton	Dia No. 127	1905	York	1978–7058	
LNWR	310	Brake First Corridor	Wolverton	Dia No. 127	1905	Shildon	1978–7059	
NER	3591	Clerestory Dynamometer Car	Darlington Works	Dia No. 101a	1906	York	1975–7050	
SR (ex LSWR)	7834 (72)	Dining Saloon, later ambulance car	Eastleigh		1907	York	2013–7191	
ECJS	395	Twelve-wheel Royal Saloon	Doncaster	Dia No. 81	1908	York	1983–7007	
GCR	666	Third Open	Dukinfield	Dia No. 5G1, Lot No. 5067	1910	Quainton Road	1988–7003	
SECR	59 Topaz	Pullman Parlour First	Birmingham Railway Carriage and Wagon Company, Smethwick	Dia No. G	1914	York	1975–7028	
MR	3463	Twelve-wheel 3rd dining	Derby	Dia No. 575, Lot No. 843	1914	York	1975–7030	
Rhodesia Railways	1808	3 ft 6 in (1,067 mm) gauge 1st/2nd class sleeping car (originally 1st)	Metropolitan Carriage, Wagon and Finance Company, Birmingham		1928	National Collections Centre, Wroughton	2005-7446	
L&MR		Four-wheel 2nd Open (replica)			1930	York	1975–7036	
L&MR	1	Four-wheel 2nd Open (replica)			1930	York	1975–7036	
L&MR	Huskisson	Four-wheel 1st (replica)	LMS		1930	York	1978–7050	
L&MR	Traveller	Four-wheel 1st (replica)	LMS		1930	York	1975–7035	
GWR	9631	Buffet Car	Swindon	Dia No. H41, Lot No. 1518	1934	Swindon	1978–7063	
CIWL	3792	Sleeping Car	Ateliers de Construction du Nord de la France, Blanc-Misseron		1936	Shildon	1978–7047	
LNER	650	Buffet Car	York	Dia No. 167, Lot No. 761	1937	York	1978–7065	
LMS	5987	Corridor Brake Third	Derby	Dia No. 1968, Lot No. 1035	1937	Shildon	1977–7000	
LMS	45053	Mobile Test Unit			1938	Embsay		
LMS	799	Twelve-wheel Royal Saloon	Wolverton	Dia No. 2054, Lot No. 1168	1941	York	1983–7006	
BR	35468	Brake Corridor Second	Wolverton railway works, BR	Dia No. 181, Lot No. 30721	1963	York	1990–7377	
BR	21274	Brake Corridor Composite	Derby, BR	Dia No. 172, Lot No. 30732	1964	Shildon	1995–7147	

=== Non-passenger coaching stock ===
Railway	Number	Type	Builder	Diagram and lot no.	Built	Location	Object Number	Image
Grand Junction Railway	282693	1838 Travelling Post Office replica	Wolverton (LMS)		1938	Shildon	1975-7043/1	
West Coast Joint Stock (LNWR)	186	TPO	Wolverton	Dia No. 87	1883	York	1975–7042	
GNR	948	Six-wheel full brake	Doncaster		1887	York	1975–7044	
ECJS	82	Gangwayed Full Brake	Doncaster	Dia No. 38	1908	Shildon	1988–7008	
LNWR	275	Four-wheel Open Carriage Truck	Wolverton	Dia No. 466	1908	York	1988–7009	
GWR	2775	"Siphon G" Milk Van	Swindon	Dia No. O33, Lot No. 1578	1936	Shildon	1988–7010	
LMS	44057	Six-wheel milk tank	Derby Works	Dia No. 1994, Lot No. 1067	1937	York	1988–7011	
SR	3733	Special Cattle Van	Lancing, BR		1951	Shildon	1988–7012	
BR	96369	Horse Box	Earlestown, BR	Dia No. 751, Lot No. 30146	1957	Shildon	1988–7013	

== Goods wagons and freight stock ==
Railway	Number	Type	Builder	Diagram and lot no.	Built	Location	Object Number	Image
Peak Forest Tramway	174	Four-wheel quarry truck			1815	York	1975–7053	
Cramlington Colliery		Four-wheel Chaldron wagon			1826	Shildon	1975–7054	
Thomas James, Stratford and Moreton Tramway		Horse-drawn wagon			c.1840-45	York	1995-7001	
		Dandy cart			c.1845 design	Shildon	1975–7060	
GNR	112	Four-wheel hand crane	Doncaster, GNR		1848	Shildon	1978–7120	
Seaham Harbour	31	Chaldron wagon			c.1865-70	Shildon	1975–7055	
NER	512	Four-wheel oil tank wagon	Darlington Wagon & Engineering Co.		1889	Shildon	1975–7045	
MSLR	6671	4-plank Goods wagon	Dukinfield, MSLR		1890	Manchester	Y1998.24	
NER	12	Snow Plough	NER	Dia No. U31	1891	Shildon	1978–7123	
LSWR	99	Four-wheel goods brake van	Eastleigh, LSWR	Dia No. 1541	1894	Shildon	1978–7091	
Caledonian Railway	300041	Well Trolley	St. Rollox, CR	Dia No. 41	1896	Bo'ness		
LSWR	5830	Open Carriage Truck	Eastleigh, LSWR	Dia No. 1641	1898	Yeovil	1978–	
Shell-Mex and BP	3171	Four-wheel rectangular tank wagon			1901	Shildon	1983–7775	
NER	4551	Four-wheel 8-plank hopper	Shildon	Dia No. P7	1902	Shildon	1978–7093	
NER	63229	Stores van	York	Dia No. H3	1902	North Yorkshire Moors	1982–7002	
NER	CME 13	Steam breakdown crane	Manchester, Cravens		1907	York	1975–7051	
NER	14974	Four-wheel loco sand wagon			1912	Shildon	1978–7095	
LSWR	1380	Gunpowder Van	Eastleigh, LSWR	Dia No. 1701	1912	Yeovil		
LNWR	21408	Goods van	Earlestown, LNWR	Dia No. 88	1917	York	1978–7076	
GCR		Single bolster	Birmingham, Metro-Cammell		1920	Shildon	1994–7391	
LNER	14	Nitric Acid Tank			1928	Yeovil		
Stanton Ironworks	9988	7-plank end-tip mineral wagon			1931	Shildon	1978–7115	
GWR	112884	'Mink G' goods van	Swindon, GWR	Dia No. V.22, Lot No. 1067	1931	York	1978–7101	
LMS	295987	Goods brake van	Derby, LMS	Dia No. D1890, Lot No. 71x	1933	York	1984–7000	
PLM	475014	Ferry Van	Mauberge, PLM		1935	York	1988–7017	
BR ex GWR	126438	Motor Car Goods Van	Swindon, GWR	Dia No. G31	1935	Shildon	1988–7016	
SR	56297	"Queen Mary" goods brake van	Lancing/Ashford Works, SR	Dia No. 1550, Lot No. 867	1936	Shildon	1980–7002	
LMS	472867	3-plank open wagon	Derby, LMS	Dia No. D1927, Lot No. 922	1936	Shildon	1982–7003	
LMS	499254	Tube Wagon	Horbury, Chas Roberts	Dia No. D1675, Lot No. 938	1936	Battlefield	1978–7116	
BR ex WD	W 161042	"Warflat" 50-ton Bogie Flat Wagon	Birmingham, Metro-Cammell	Dia No. BR 73	1940	Shildon	1988-7015	
LNER	246710	Goods brake van	Darlington Works, LNER	Dia No. 158	1941	North Yorkshire Moors	1994–7392	
LMS	700728	Lowmac	Shildon, LNER	Dia No. P54A, Lot No. 1342	1944	Shildon	1978–7103	
LNER	270919	Coal Hopper	Motherwell, Hurst Nelson	Dia No. 100	1945	Shildon	1978–7106	
LNER	DE 470818	Ballast Brake Van	Wishaw, R. Y. Pickering	Dia No. 203	1948	Shildon	1993–7121	
BR	900805	Well Trolley	Derby, BR	Dia No. 2/730, Lot No. 2029	1950	Shildon	1978–7110	
BR	B 901601	Trestrol EC	Teesside Bridge & Engineering	Dia No. 2/681, Lot No. 2175	1950	East Lancs	1992–7393	
BR	893343	Cattle Van	Swindon, BR	Dia No. 1/353, Lot No. 2269	1951	York	1978–7111	
BR	B 943139	Bogie Bolster	Birmingham, Metro-Cammell	Dia No. 1/471, Lot No. 2406	1952	Shildon	1978–7112	
ICI	19154	Bogie Mineral Hopper Wagon	Horbury, Chas Roberts		1953	Shildon	2001-7167	
National Benzole	2022	Petrol Tank Wagon	Cardiff, Powell Duffryn		1954	Shildon	1975-7048	
BR	227009	Mineral Wagon	Teesside Bridge & Engineering	Dia No. 1/108, Lot No. 2742	1955	Shildon	1982–7005	
BR	743141	China Clay wagon	Swindon, BR	Dia No. 1/051, Lot No. 2697	1955	Shildon	1995–7146	
BR	873368	Presflo Cement Hopper	Gloucester Railway Carriage and Wagon Company	Dia No. 1/272, Lot No. 3361	1961	Shildon	1986–7004	
BR	B 882583	Banana Van	Wolverton, BR	Dia No. 1/246, Lot No. 3290	1960	York	1978–7114	
BR	350000	"Merry-go-Round" hopper coal wagon	Darlington, BR	Prototype HAA	1964	Shildon	1995–7852	
Philips Petroleum	85209	Bogie Petrol Tank Wagon	Horbury, Chas Roberts	Dia No. 6/291	1970	Shildon	7053-1985	
BR	60152-601403	Pair of Freightliner Bogie Flat Wagons	Ashford, BR	FGA	1971	York		

== Rolling stock formerly part of the National Collection ==
=== Standard gauge steam locomotives ===
Railway	Number and name	Type or Class	Builder	Works Number	Built	Wheels	Location	Object Number	Image
LSWR	563 (Note: London and South Western Railway 563 was numbered E563 by the Southern Railway before reverting to 563, and 30563 by British Railways.)	T3 Class	LSWR Nine Elms	380	1893	4-4-0	Swanage	1975–7000 (Note: London and South Western Railway 563 was donated from the National Collection to the Swanage Railway in 2017.)	
GWR	2818	2800 Class	GWR Swindon	2122	1905	2-8-0	Swindon	1976–7001 (Note: Great Western Railway 2818 was donated from the National Collection to STEAM – Museum of the Great Western Railway in 2017.)	
NSR	2 (Note: North Staffordshire Railway number 2 was later London Midland and Scottish Railway number 2271. It was then sold to Manchester Collieries where it was their number 2.)	New L Class	NSR Stoke		1922	0-6-2T	Foxfield	1978–7032 (Note: North Staffordshire Railway number 2 was transferred from the National Collection to the Foxfield railway in 2016.)	
CEGB	Eustace Forth		Robert Stephenson and Hawthorns	7063	1942	0-4-0ST	Foxfield	1978–7007 (Note: RSH 0-4-0ST Eustace Forth was donated from the National Collection to the Foxfield Railway in August 2014.)	
WD	King Feisal of Iraq		Hunslet	3183	1944	0-6-0ST	(Note: 0-6-0ST King Feisal of Iraq is currently at the Flour Mills Workshops in Bream, Gloucestershire for overhaul.)	2005–7287 (Note: Ownership of Austerity tank King Faisal of Iraq was transferred from the National Collection to the Flour Mill in February 2016.)	

=== Internal combustion ===
Railway	Number and name	Type or Class	Builder	Works Number	Built	Wheels	Location	Object Number	Image
BR	50033 Glorious	Class 50	English-Electric	3803	1968	Co-Co	Severn Valley Railway		

=== Narrow gauge steam locomotives ===
Railway	Number or name	Type or Class	Builder	Works Number	Built	Wheels	Gauge	Location	Object Number	Image
Industrial	Handyman		Hudswell Clarke	573	1900	0-4-0ST	3 ft (914 mm)	Statfold	2008–7985 (Note: Handyman was donated from the National Collection to the Statfold Narrow Gauge Museum Trust in 2021.)	

=== Narrow gauge electric ===
Railway	Number	Type or Class	Builder	Works Number	Built	Wheels	Gauge	Location	Object Number	Image
Post Office	809	1930 stock	EE	809	1931	A-1-1-A	2 ft (610 mm)	York	1986–7000	

=== Electric multiple unit coaches ===
Railway	Unit number	Unit class	Car number	Car type	Builder	Built	Location	Object Number	Image
LMS		502	28361; 29896	DMBTO; DTC	Derby	1939	Merseyside Transport Trust	(Note: Ownership transferred from NRM to Friends of the 502 group by October 2011.)	
BR (SR)	3545	4-VEP	76875	DTC	British Railways	1974	Shepherdswell	2006–7360 (Note: Ownership of 4-VEP 3545 was transferred to the East Kent Railway as of 2016.)	
BR		Class 370	49006	Power Car	BREL Derby	1978	Crewe Heritage Centre	1988–7006/7 (Note: Ownership transferred from NRM to Crewe Heritage Centre Trust by April 2018)	

=== Passenger coaches ===
Railway	Number	Type	Builder	Diagram and lot no.	Built	Location	Object number	Image
GWR	820	Six-wheel tricomposite (was BG)	Swindon	Dia No. U29, Lot no. 370	1887	Didcot	1978–7055 (Note: De-accessioned from the National Collection in 2022.)	
MR	2234	Railmotor, now Saloon	Derby, MR	Dia No. 479, Lot No. 578	1904, Saloon: 1907	Horncliffe	(Note: Into National Collection in 1977, de-accessioned around 2015.)	
LYR	10825	Third Class Corridor, later Medical Examination Car	Newton Heath, LYR	Dia No. 90, Lot No. E32	1910	Rowsley	(Note: 10825 joined the National Collection through the Science and Industry Museum collection. The carriage was de-accessioned and transferred to the LMS Carriage Association in 2018.)	
LNWR	5000	Chairman's Saloon	Wolverton	Dia No. D12	1920	Butterley		
GWR	9006	Special Saloon	Swindon	Dia No. G64	1945	Carnforth	1987–7011	
SR	1456	Third Open	Lancing (underframe); Eastleigh (body)	Dia No. 2017, Lot No. E3234	1947	Ropley (Note: At Ropley for major restoration on 25-year loan since 2012.)	(Note: During re-appraisal of items from the National Collection in the 1990s, 1456 went to the Bluebell.)	
BR	4286	Tourist Second Open	BRCW	Dia No. 93, Lot No. 30207	1956	North Yorkshire Moors		
BR	311 Eagle	Pullman Kitchen First	Metro Cammell	Dia No. 130, Lot No. 3281	1960	Tyseley Locomotive Works	(Note: 311 Eagle was part of the National Collection but was reported to be no longer be part of it in February 2019.)	
BR	1100	Prototype Griddle Car	Eastleigh, BR	Dia No. 30, Lot No. 30637	1960	Great Central		
BR	13252	Prototype Mk2 FK	Swindon (BR)	Dia No. 120, Lot No. 30550	1962	Mid-Norfolk	(Note: 13252 was said to no longer be a part of the National Collection on its RHRP (VCT carriage survey) page and now owned by the Mid-Norfolk Railway.)	
BR	81025	Gangwayed Full Brake	Sheffield, Cravens	Dia No. 711, Lot No. 30224	1956	Bluebell Railway	Museum catering vehicle Countess of York	

=== Non-passenger coaching stock ===
Railway	Number	Type	Builder	Diagram and lot no.	Built	Location	Object number	Image
SR	4920	Post Office Sorting Van	Eastleigh	Dia No. 3192, Lot No. 1043	1939	Nene Valley Railway	(Note: Ownership transferred from NRM to the Nene Valley Railway in April 2005.)	
LMS	30272	Post Office Sorting Van	Wolverton	Dia No. 2167, Lot No. 1559	1949	Nene Valley Railway	(Note: Donated to the Nene Valley Railway by the NRM in March 1996.)	

=== Wagons ===
Railway	Number	Type	Builder	Diagram and lot no.	Built	Location	Object Number	Image
MSLR		Goods van underframe			1882	Aysgarth	1978–7075 (Note: Body of the van scrapped in September 2011. Donated by NRM to Aysgarth Station Project.)	
GCR	10	Goods van body			1910	York, now scrapped	1978–7075 (Note: Body of the van scrapped in September 2011.)	
GNR	432764	Goods van	GNR		1915	York, now scrapped or dismantled	1976–7096 (Note: Van dismantled in September 2011 and ironwork sent to an unknown site.)	
NER		Goods van	NER		1917	Embsay	(Note: De-accessioned from the National Collection in 2003. Now at Embsay.)	
LSWR	11813	Machinery Flat	Eastleigh, LSWR	Dia No. 1676	1921	Ropley	1994–7393	
LMS	197266	Ballast/Plough brake van	Sheffield, Cravens	Dia No. D1805, Lot No. 635	1932	Embsay	1980–7008	
LMS	722702	Single bolster	Derby (LMS)	Dia No. D1950, Lot No. 1105	1938	York, now scrapped	(Note: De-accessioned from the National Collection in 2006, then scrapped in 2012.)	
SNCF	192437	Mineral Wagon	Birmingham, Metro-Cammell	Dia No. 1/112, Lot No. 2286	1946	Midsomer Norton	1978–7105 (Note: De-accessioned from the National Collection in 2021.)	
SR	14036	Shock absorbing wagon	Ashford (BR SR)	Dia No. 1392, Lot No. 3443	1948	Bluebell Railway	1982–7007	
BR	B 383560	Iron Ore Tippler	Shildon, BR	Dia No. 1/181, Lot No. 2601	1953	Rutland Railway Museum	1978–7113	
BR	B 436275	Iron Ore Hopper	Birmingham Railway Carriage & Wagon Company	Dia No. 1/162, Lot No. 2148	1950	Rutland Railway Museum	1978–7108	
