= Silver lode =

Silver lode or Silverlode may refer to:

- Silver lode, a deposit of silver found alloyed with gold
- Silverlode, fictional river described by English author J. R. R. Tolkien
- Silver Lode (film), 1954 American western directed by Allan Dwan

== See also ==
- Lode (disambiguation)
