= Lodestar =

Lodestar is an archaic word for a star that guides, especially the northern pole star.

Lodestar may also refer to:

== Art and entertainment ==
- Lodestar Award for Best Young Adult Book, an award given annually at the World Science Fiction Convention
- Lodestar (band), an English band founded in 1996, or their debut album
- Lodestar (album), 2016 album by the English folk musician Shirley Collins
- LodeStar Festival, an annual music festival in Lode, Cambridgeshire, England
- "Lodestar", a 1973 short story by Poul Anderson
- Lodestar, a 2000 science fiction novel by Michael Flynn

== Vehicles ==
- GWR 4000 Class 4003 Lode Star, a British steam locomotive
- Lockheed Model 18 Lodestar, a passenger transport aircraft of the World War II era
- Lodestar (trimaran), a cruising trimaran sailboat design

== Other uses ==
- Lodestar (navigation), a star used in celestial navigation
- Lodestar method, a basis for calculating attorney's fees

== See also ==
- Loadstar (disambiguation)
- Lodestone
