= Lodes =

Lodes may refer to:

- Lode, an economic mineral deposit

== People ==
- Birgit Lodes (born 1967), German musicologist
- Rudolf Lodes (1909–2006), German doctor

== Places ==
- Cambridgeshire Lodes, a network of artificial drainage channels in England
- Lodes, Haute-Garonne, France
- Lodes, Latvia, in Tārgale Parish, Latvia

== See also ==
- Lode (disambiguation)
