= Museum of the Great Western Railway =

STEAM Museum of the Great Western Railway
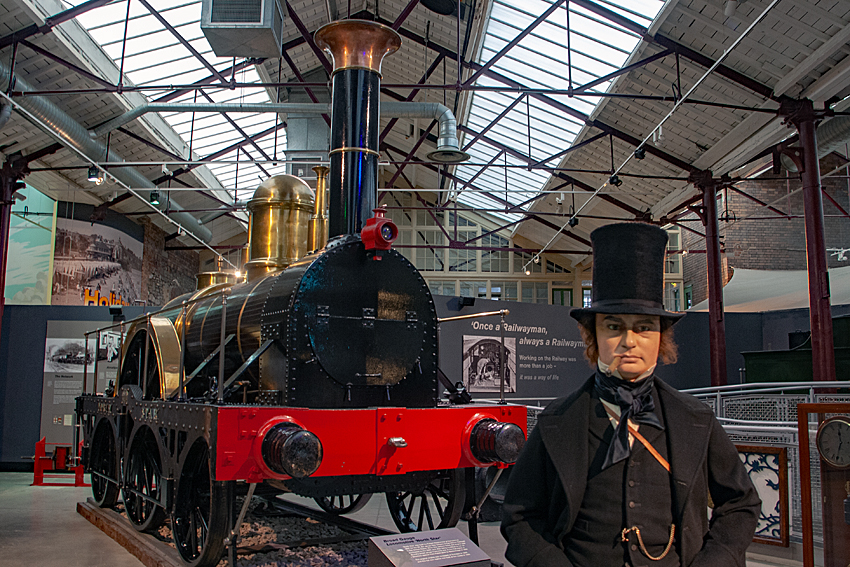
- Brunel and North Star

- Location within Wiltshire
- Established: 2000
- Coordinates: 51°33′46″N 1°47′42″W
- Type: Industrial museum
- Key holdings: Locomotives of the GWR
- Public transit access: Swindon railway station
- Website: www.steam-museum.org.uk

STEAM – Museum of the Great Western Railway, also known as Swindon Steam Railway Museum, is housed in part of the former railway works in Swindon, England – Wiltshire's 'railway town'. The 6,500-square-metre (70,000 sq ft) museum opened in 2000.

== The site ==
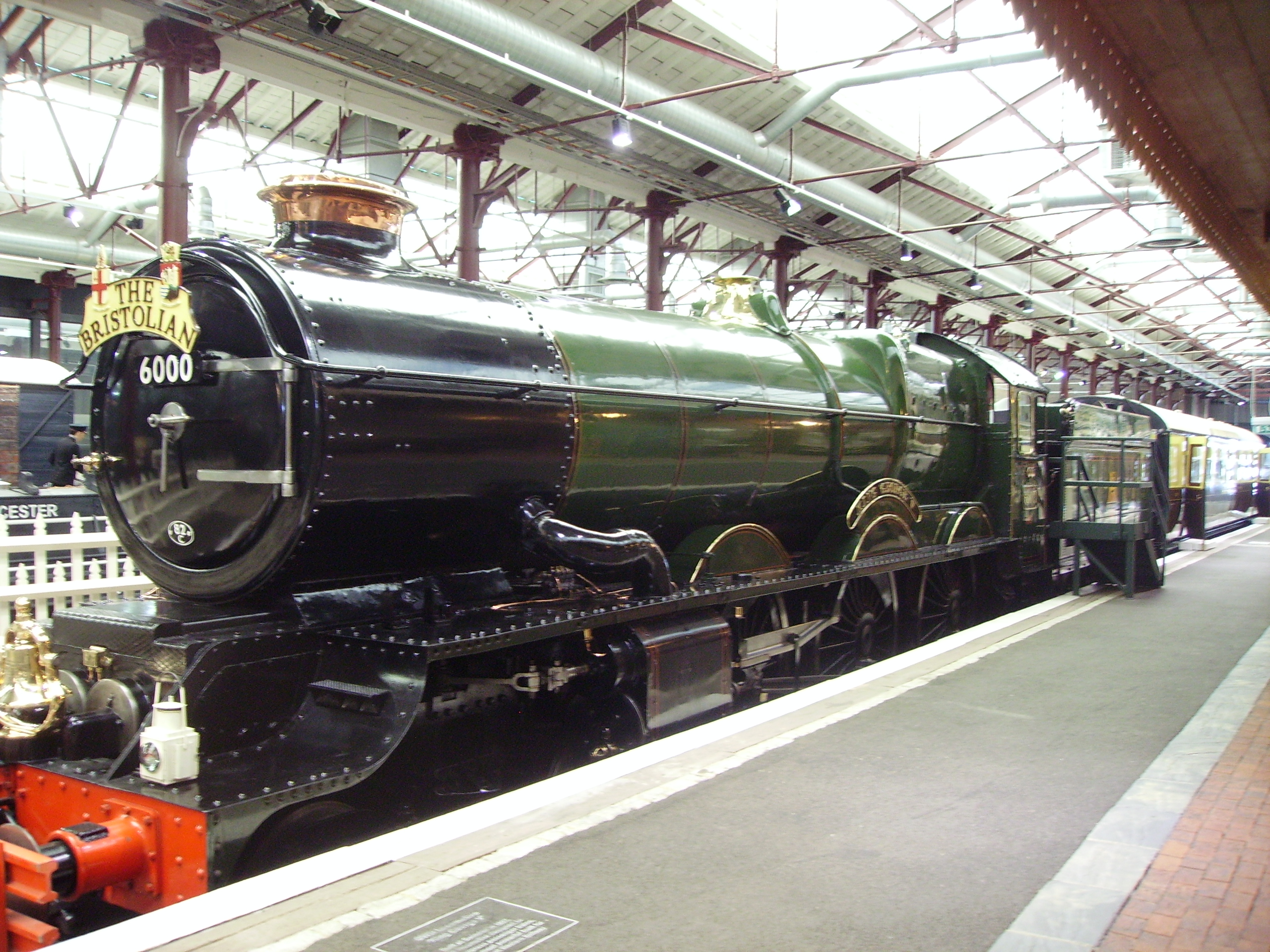
King George V with Bristolian headboard

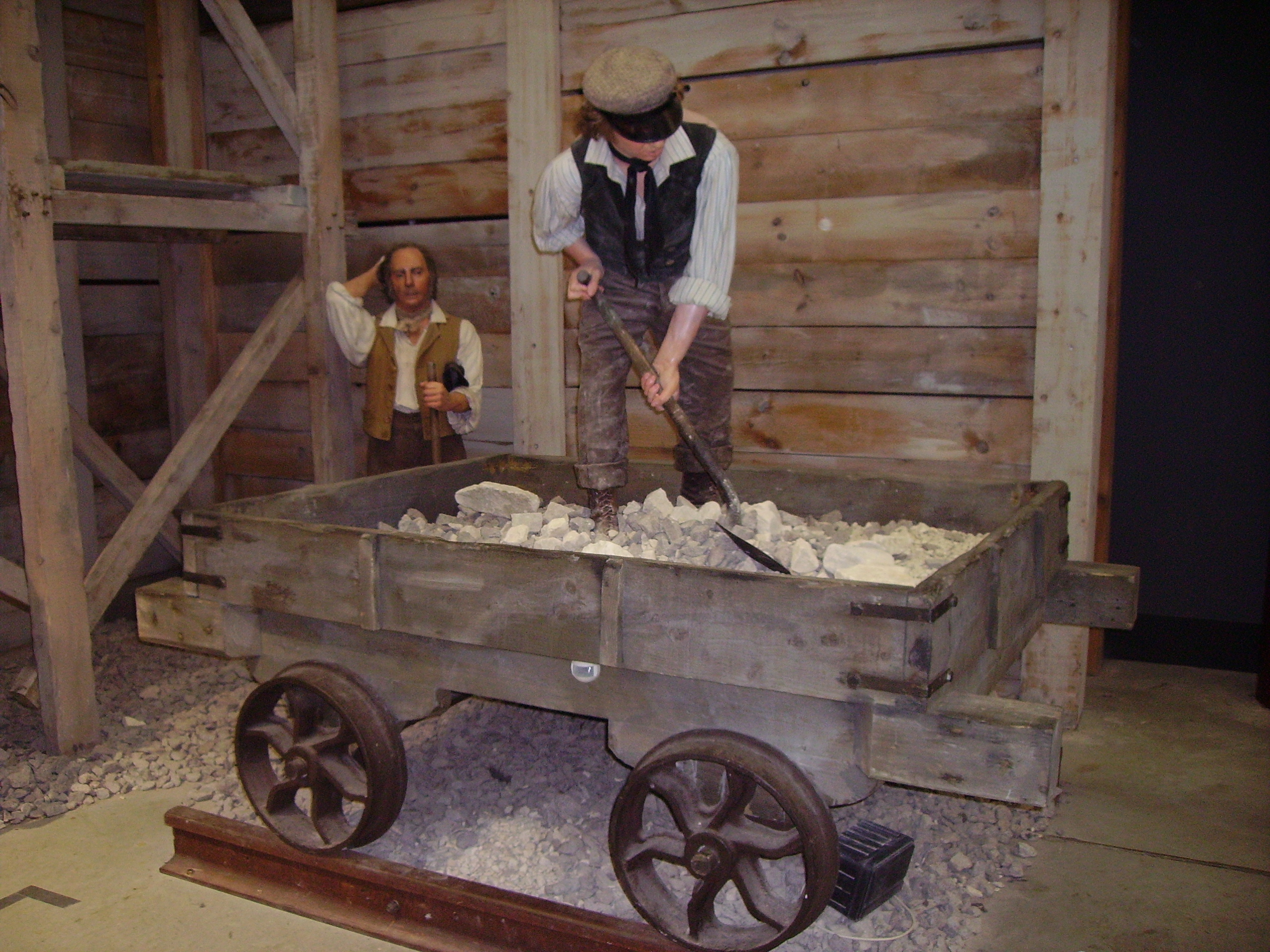
Ballast wagon

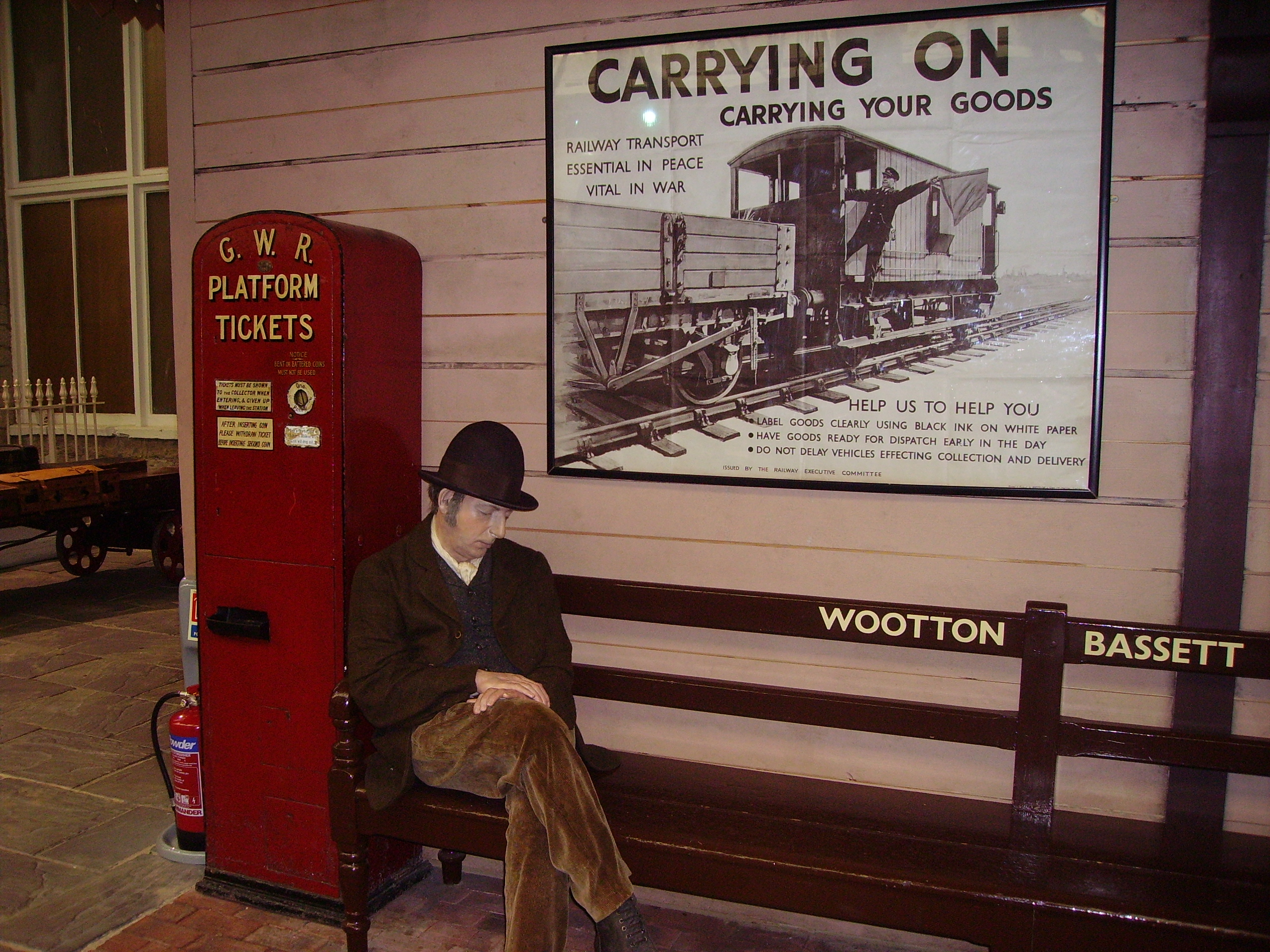
Platform scene

The museum is housed in a former engineering workshop, built c.1842 using squared rubble from the Box Tunnel, and forming part of the Swindon Works of the Great Western Railway. The works was one of the largest in the world and operated from 1843 to 1986. In its heyday, it covered more than 300 acres (120 ha), and could turn out three locomotives per week.

Most of the former works buildings are now a McArthurGlen Designer Outlet. Also on the site are the headquarters of the National Trust (in the Heelis building) and offices of English Heritage.

== The museum ==
Apart from many exhibits of interest to railway engine and rolling stock enthusiasts, it tells the social story of the railway community in Swindon, with recorded personal experiences and film archives. Lifelike exhibits show people at work and human interactions. There are exhibits explaining the construction of locomotives, of railway equipment and of the railways themselves. It also tells the history of the Great Western Railway and the life of Isambard Kingdom Brunel, the famous Victorian engineer, who masterminded the construction of the original Great Western Railway. There are many hands-on exhibits and interactive displays. Enthusiastic ex-railway workers are on hand, to give a personal insight into many of the exhibits.

There is a series of reconstructions of areas of work, such as office, stores, workshop, signal box and foundry.

The museum holds an extensive archive of books, periodicals, photographs, drawings and plans, relating to the Great Western Railway.

== Location ==
The museum is near Swindon's town centre, adjacent to the Designer Outlet, at Ordnance Survey mapping six-figure grid reference SU 143848.

== Predecessor ==
The museum replaced the smaller GWR Museum which had opened in June 1962 on Faringdon Road, just south of the former railway works. It was housed in a restored Grade II listed 1850s building which was originally a lodging house for employees at the works.

The GWR Museum had five locomotives on display: North Star, 3717 City of Truro, 4003 Lode Star, Dean Goods 2516 and pannier tank 9400 in the Churchward Gallery. In addition it had a selection of nameplates and some models and ephemera. Two rooms were dedicated to Isambard Kingdom Brunel and Daniel Gooch respectively.

== Collection ==
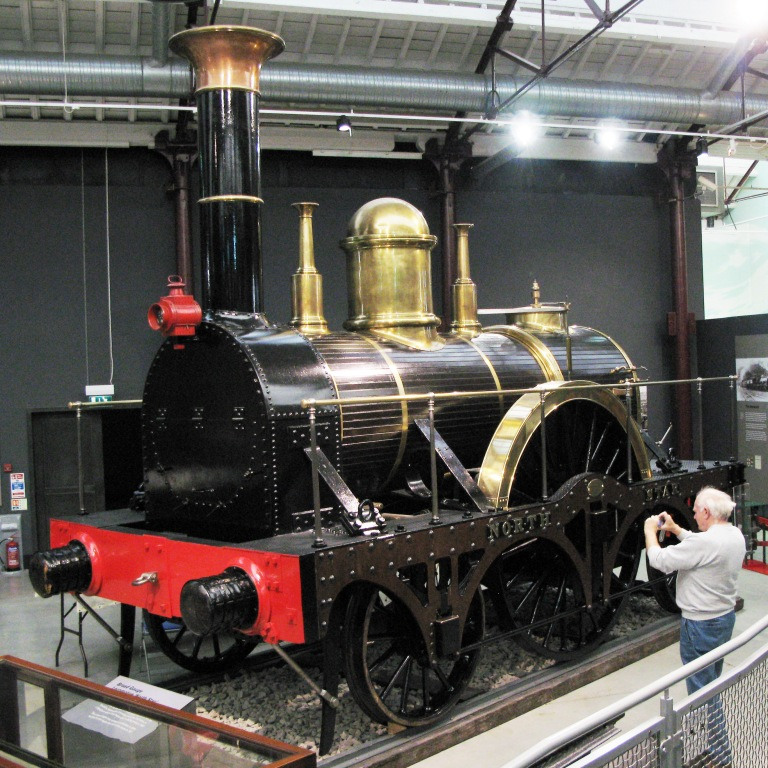
North Star

The museum is home to several GWR pre-nationalisation-era locomotives, two of which are the first members of their respective classes. The majority of these are part of the UK National Collection.

- GWR Star Class North Star – a replica of an early 7 ft 1/4 in (2,140 mm) broad gauge locomotive. Part of the National Collection
- GWR 2301 Class 2516 – Built in 1897. Part of the National Collection
- GWR 2800 Class 2818 – Built in 1905. Previously part of the National Collection. In 2017 the locomotive was deaccessioned from the National Collection and ownership was transferred to the STEAM Museum.
- GWR 3700 Class 3717 City of Truro Built in 1903. Famed for allegedly setting a speed of 102.4 mph on Wellington Bank in 1904. On loan from the National Railway Museum and arrived alongside 6000 King George V as a replacement for 4003 Lode Star & The GWR Railcar.
- GWR 4073 Class 4073 Caerphilly Castle – Built in 1923. Part of the National Collection
- GWR 4200 Class 4248 – Built in 1916. Largely dismantled to look like a locomotive in the works.
- GWR 6000 Class 6000 King George V - Built in 1927. Arrived alongside 3717 City of Truro. On loan from the National Railway Museum as a replacement for 4003 Lode Star & The GWR Railcar.
- GWR 7800 Class 7821 Ditcheat Manor - Built in 1950. Displayed in the nearby Swindon Designer Outlet
- GWR 9400 Class 9400 – Built in 1947. Part of the National Collection

The museum also displays a small collection of Great Western rolling stock and equipment, including:

== Gallery ==
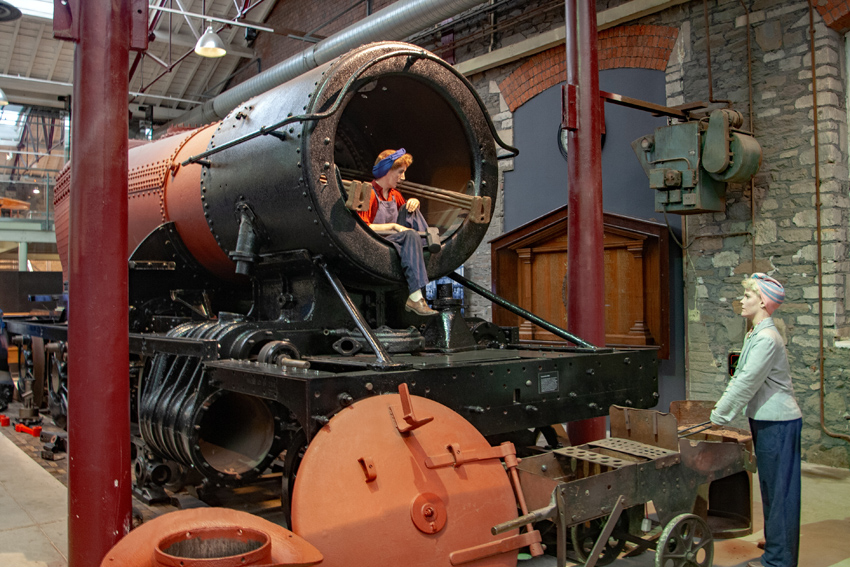
Female boilersmiths at Swindon Works in 1943

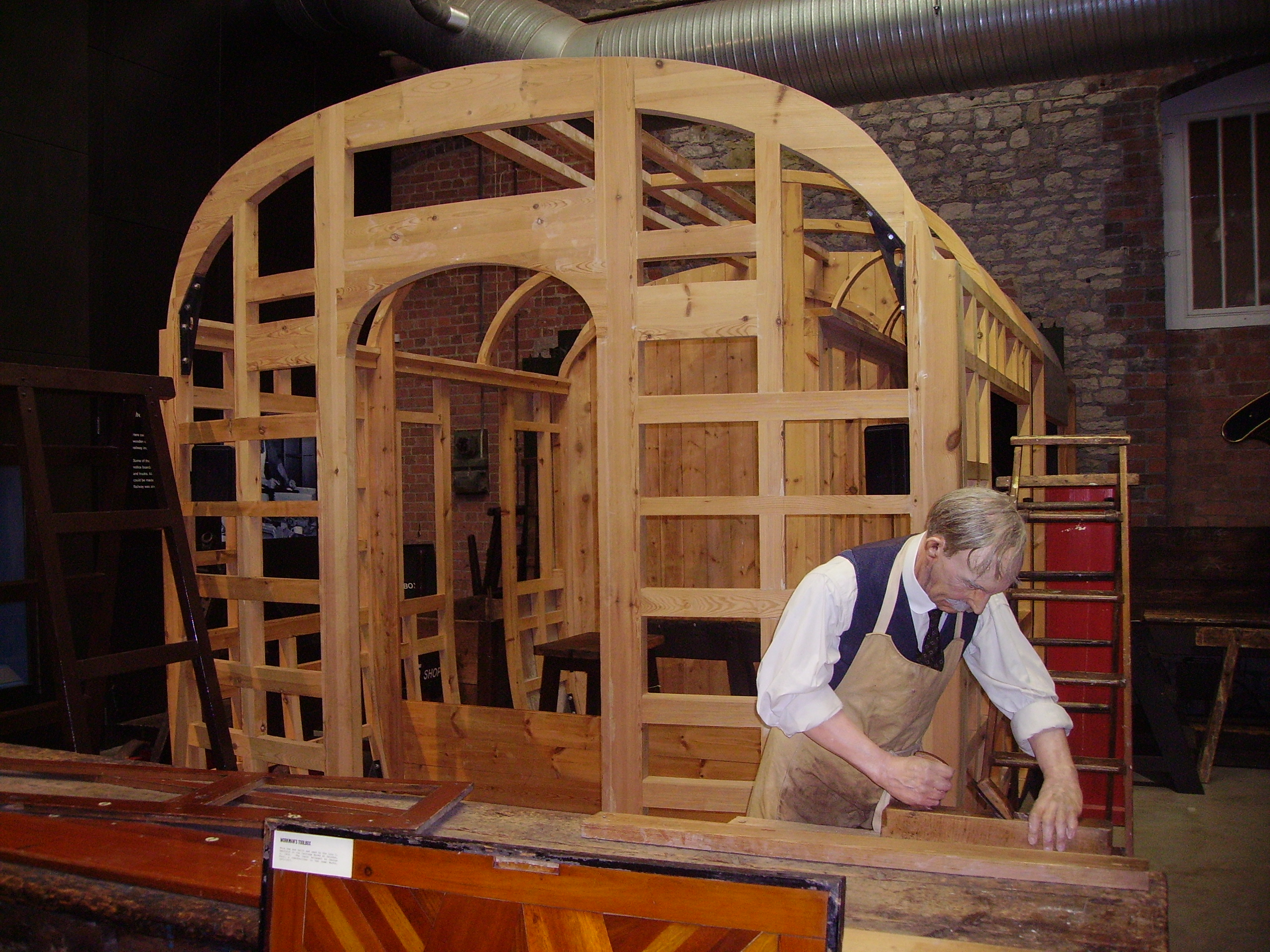
Carriage building

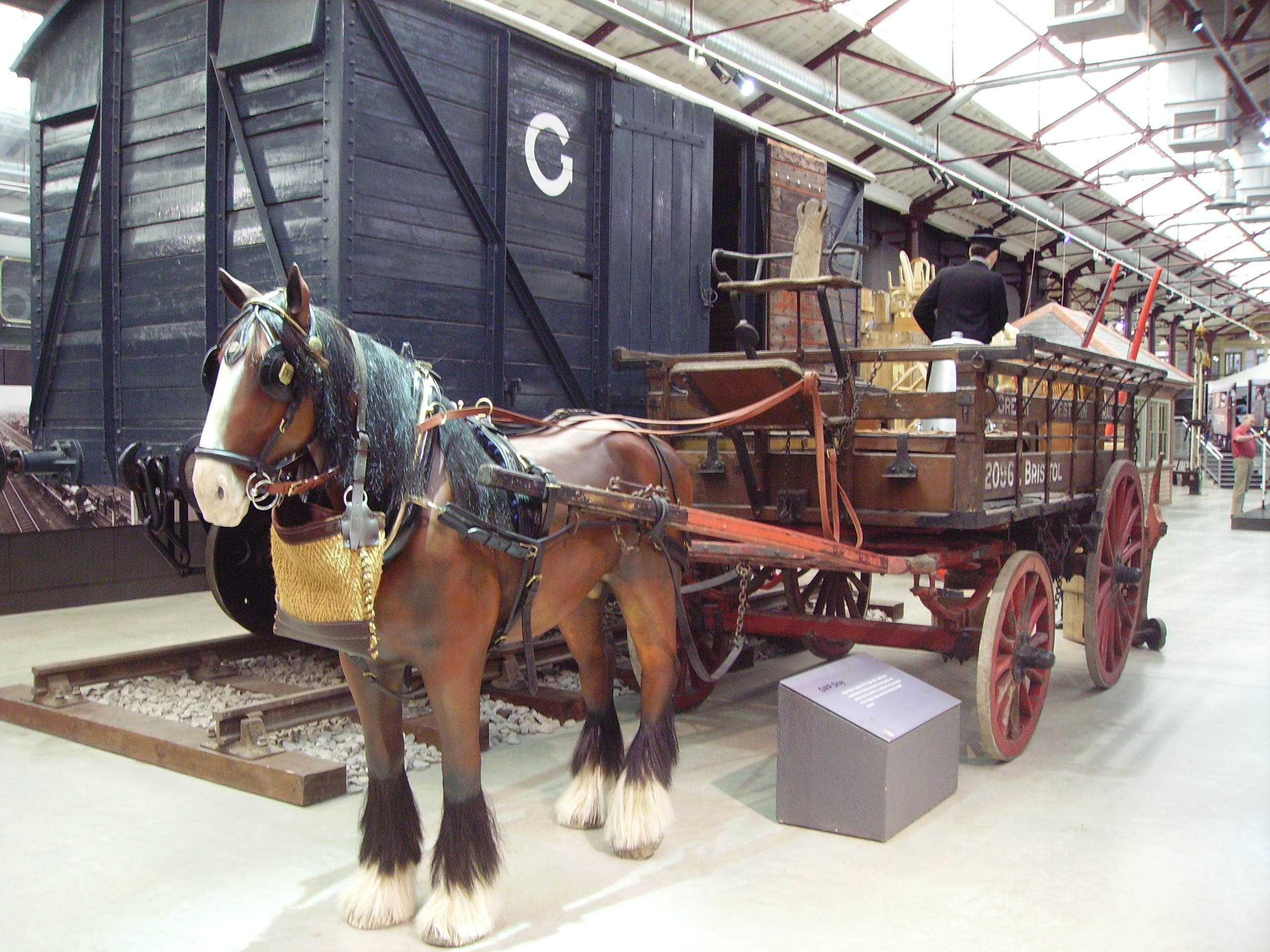
Horse dray

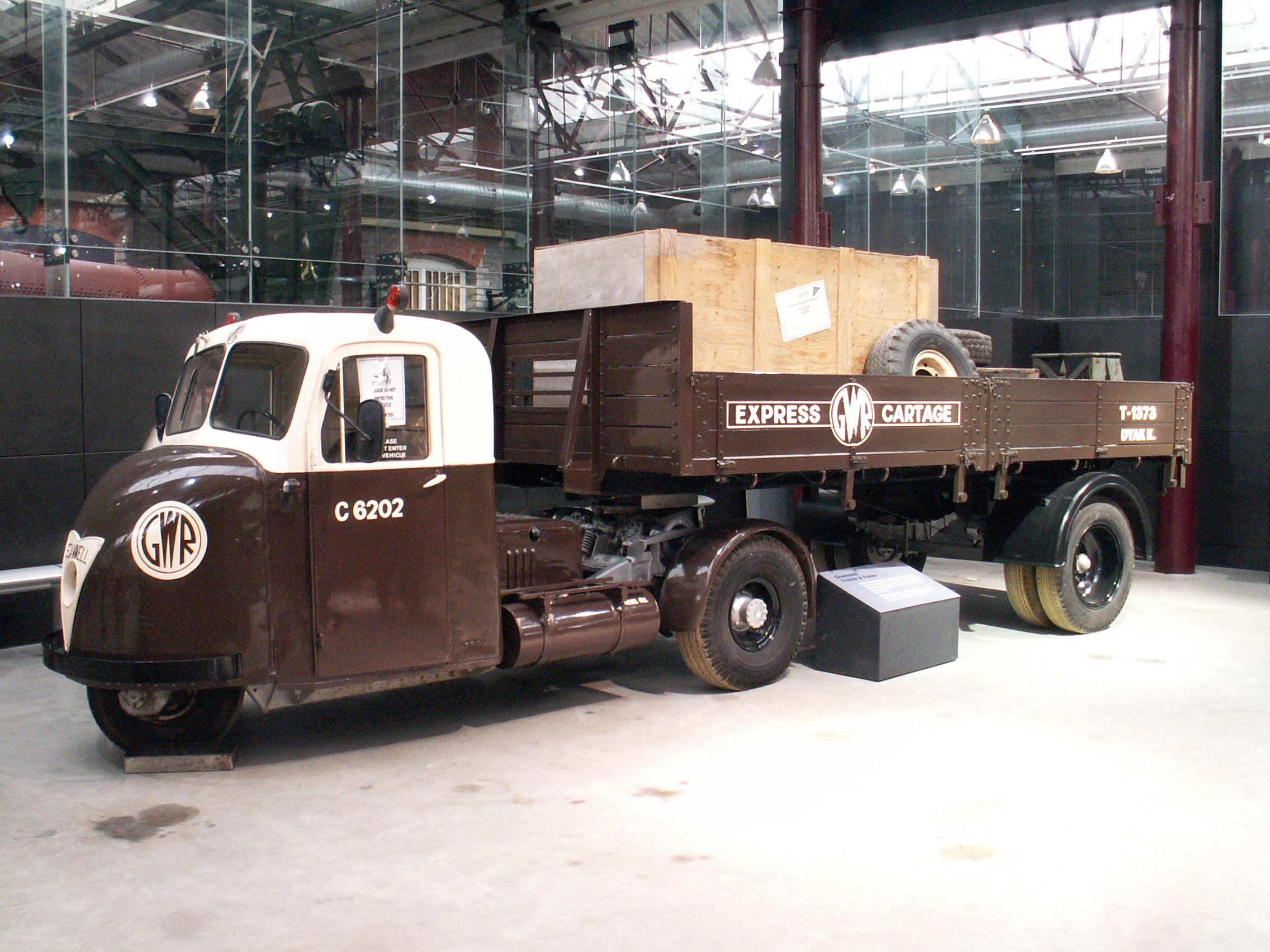
Scammell Scarab

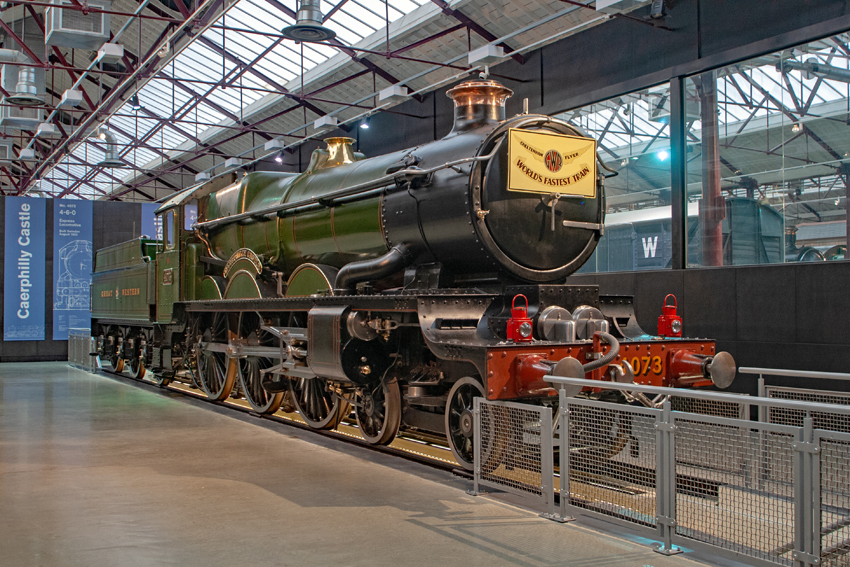
Caerphilly Castle

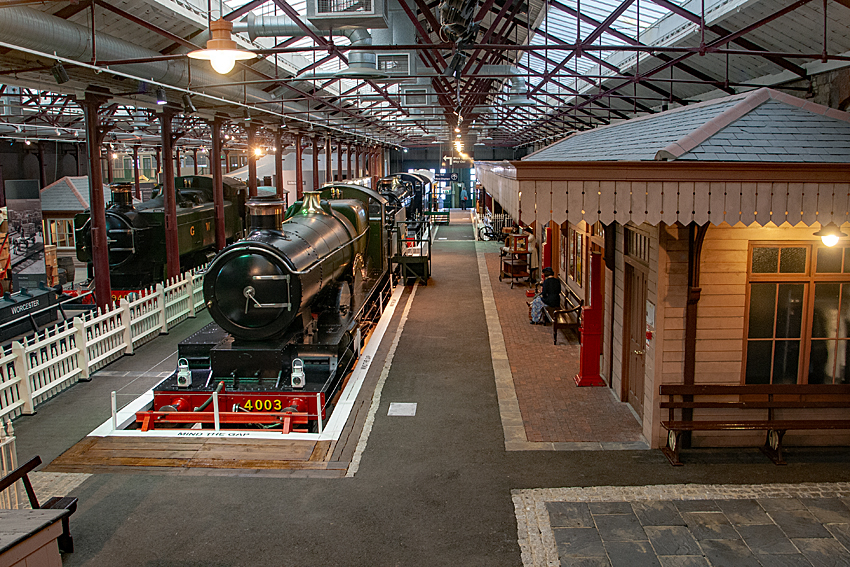
Station scene with 4003 Lode Star

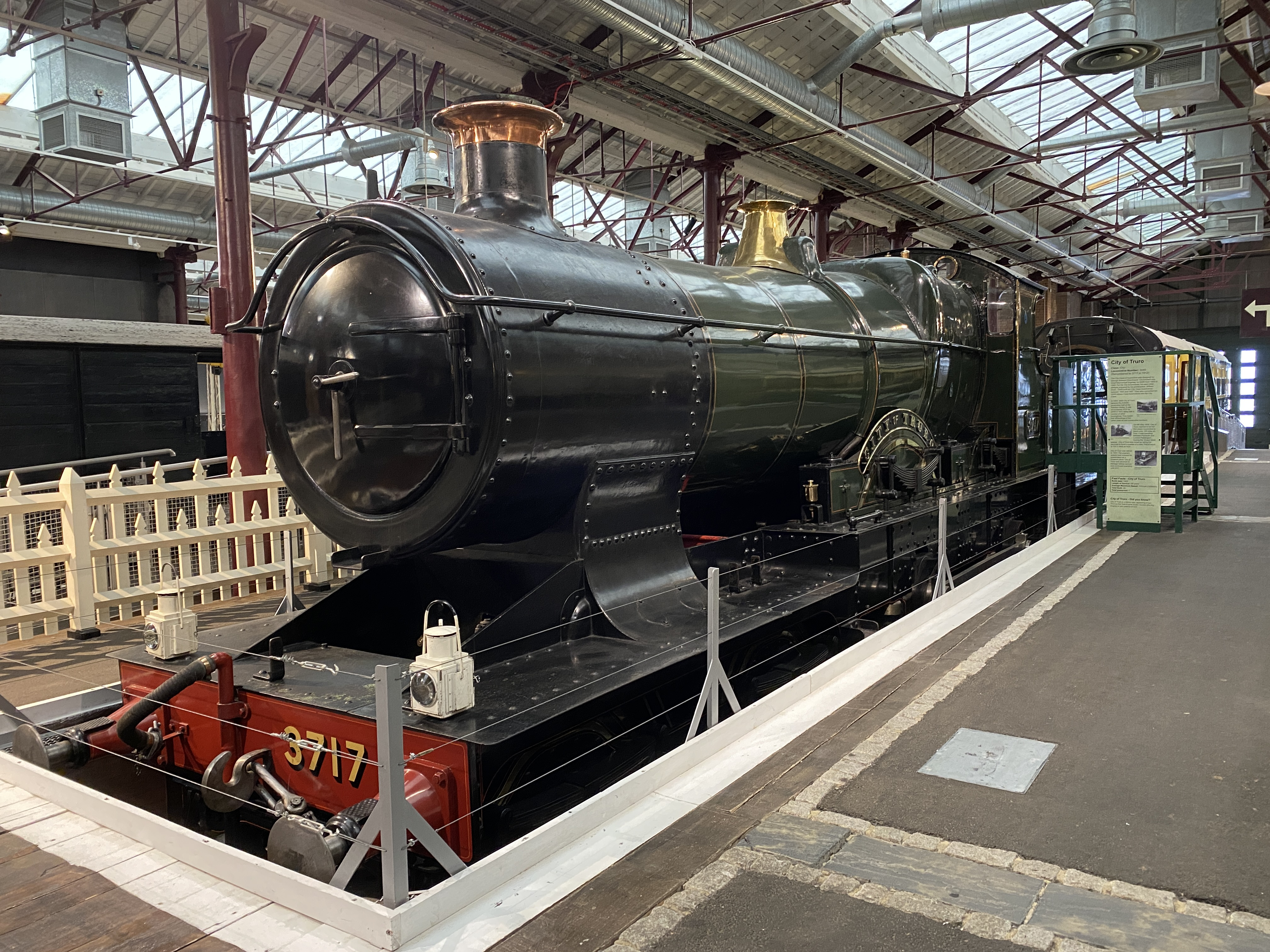
GWR 3700 Class 3440 City of Truro

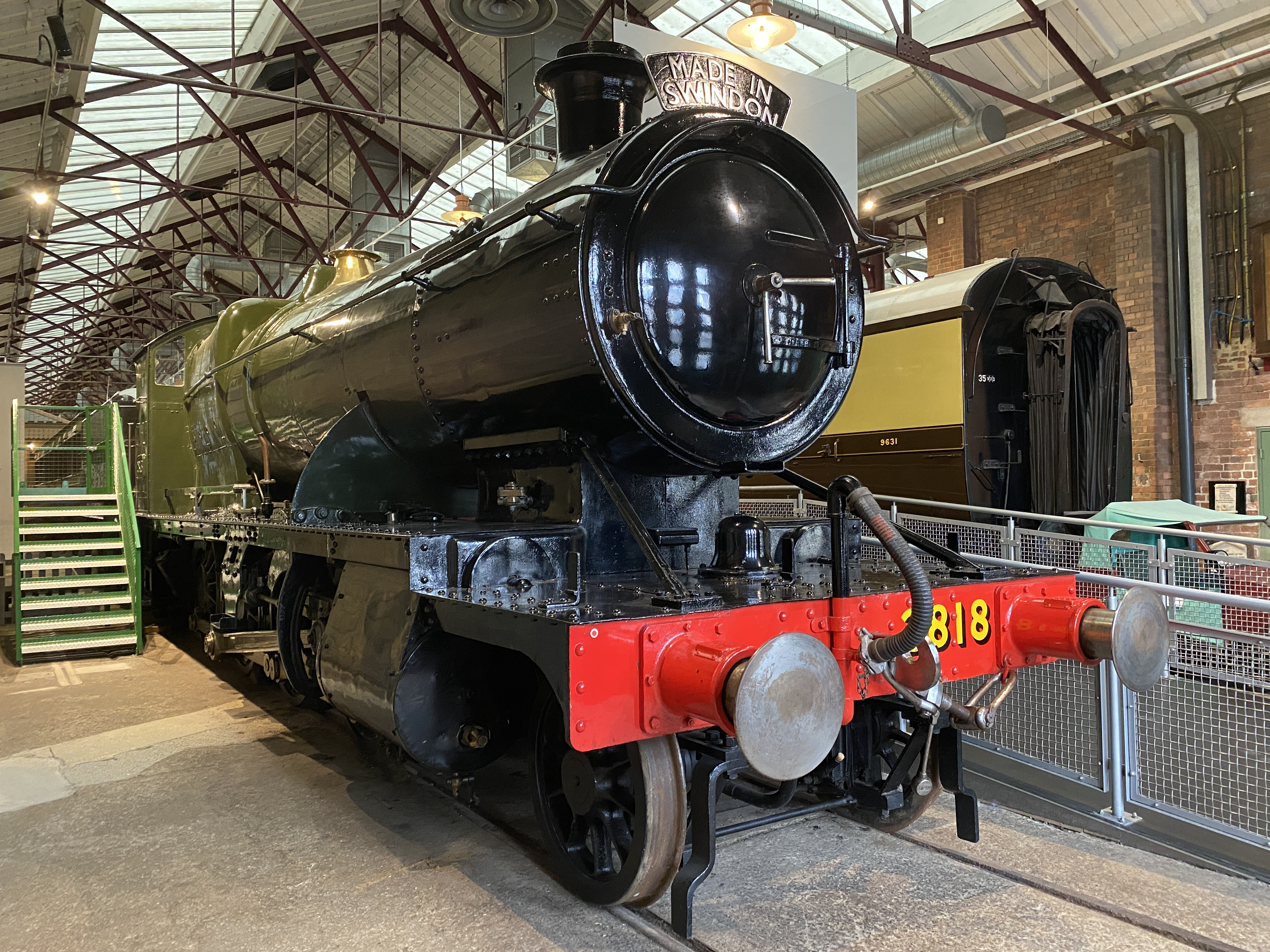
GWR 2800 Class 2818 Locomotive
