= Loadstar =

Loadstar may refer to:

- Loadstar (magazine), a disk magazine for the Commodore 64 computer
- Loadstar (duo), a music production duo from Bristol, United Kingdom
- Loadstar: The Legend of Tully Bodine, a game from Rocket Science Games
- International Loadstar, a series of medium and heavy-duty trucks

== See also ==
- Lodestar (disambiguation)
