= Lode (disambiguation) =

In geology, lode refers to an economic mineral deposit.

Lode may also refer to:

== Distinction ==
- Lode, similar to mother lode, an old English word meaning rich source of supply
- In Italy, lode is a distinction awarded to exceptional students completing a bachelor's degree

== Places ==
- Lode, Cambridgeshire, a village in England
- Lode Parish, an administrative unit of the Rūjiena Municipality, Latvia

== Other uses ==
- Cambridgeshire Lodes, a network of canal and drainage channels in England
- Lodestone, a magnetized rock
- Lode coordinates, a coordinate system
- Lode (name), a given name and surname
- Live OWL Documentation Environment, to support computer-based ontologies

== See also ==
- Lode Runner, a 1983 platform game
- Lodes (disambiguation)
- Lodestar (disambiguation)
- Mill lade
