= LodeStar Festival =

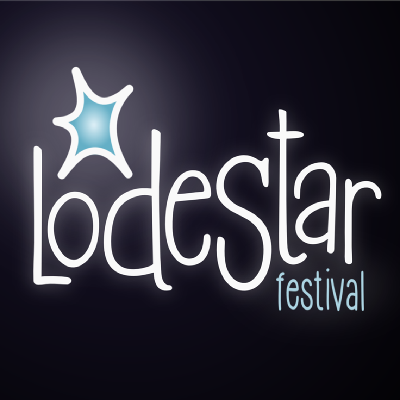
- Lodestar Festival logo.
- Genre: Alternative, pop rock, Indie, World, Electronic, Folk, Dance, Reggae, House,
- Dates: First weekend of September
- Locations: Lode, Cambridge, England
- Years active: 2008–present
- Founders: Doug Durrant
- Website: LodeStar Festival

LodeStar Festival is an annual music festival that takes place at Sunnyridge Farm in Lode, Cambridgeshire, England. It was founded in 2007, but it was first held in 2008 and showcases a cross-genre variety of music on three stages. The festival's attendance was 4500 in 2015. In addition to the music entertainment, the festival features comedians, theatre, workshops, circus acts and burlesque performances.
