= SS Guiding Star =

History
- Name: Nightingale (1939–41); Empire Egret (1941–42); Nightingale (1942); Santa Isabel (1942–46); Guiding Star (1946–73)
- Owner: Grace Lines Inc (1939-41); Ministry of War Transport (1941–42); United States Maritime Commission (1942); Grace Lines (1942–46); United States Maritime Commission (1946–73)
- Operator: Grace Lines Inc (1939-41); Ministry of War Transport (1941–42); United States Maritime Commission (1942); Grace Lines Inc (1942–46); United States Maritime Commission (1946–73)
- Port of registry: Norfolk, VA, United States (1939–41); London, United Kingdom (1941-42); (United States) Baltimore, MD (1942–46); United States (1946–73)
- Builder: Newport News Shipbuilding & Dry Dock Co
- Yard number: 373
- Completed: October 1943
- Identification: USMC Hull Number 26; United States Official Number 230064 (1939-41, 1942-73); United Kingdom Official Number 168168 (1941-42); Code Letters WCDH (1939-42); Code Letters GNRN (1941-42); Code Letters WCRH (1942-46)
- Fate: Scrapped

General characteristics
- Class & type: Type C2 cargo ship (1939-43); Troopship (1943-73)
- Tonnage: 7,169 GRT (1939-41); 7,248 GRT (1941-73); 4,328 NRT (1939-41); 4,233 NRT (1941-73); 8,656 DWT (1939-43)
- Length: 439 ft 0 in (133.81 m)
- Beam: 63 ft 2 in (19.25 m)
- Depth: 27 ft 5 in (8.36 m)
- Installed power: 1,100 nhp
- Propulsion: Two steam turbines, double reduction geared driving a single screw propeller
- Speed: 17 knots (31 km/h)

Guiding Star was a 7,248 GRT troopship that was built in 1939 as the Type C2 cargo ship Nightingale by Newport News Shipbuilding & Dry Dock Co, Newport News, Virginia, United States for Grace Lines Inc, New York. In 1941, she was transferred to the Ministry of War Transport (MoWT) and renamed Empire Egret. In 1942, she was transferred to the United States Maritime Commission (USMC) and renamed Nightingale. She was returned to Grace Lines later that year and renamed Santa Isabel. In 1943, she was converted to a troopship. She was transferred to the USMC in 1946 and renamed Guiding Star, serving until she was scrapped in 1973.

== Description ==
The ship was built in 1939 by Newport News Shipbuilding & Dry Dock Co, Newport News, Virginia. She was yard number 373, and USMC Hull number 26.

The ship was 439 feet 0 inches (133.81 m) long, with a beam of 63 feet 2 inches (19.25 m). She had a depth of 27 feet 5 inches (8.36 m). She was assessed at 7,169 GRT, 4,328 NRT, 8,656 DWT.

The ship was propelled by two steam turbines, double reduction geared, driving a single screw propeller. The turbines were made by Newport News Shipbuilding & Drydock Co. They were rated at 1,100 nhp. They could propel her at 17 knots (31 km/h).

== History ==
Nightingale was launched in 1939 and completed in October that year. Built for Grace Lines Inc, New York, her port of registry was Norfolk, Virginia. The United States Official Number 230064 and code letters WCDH were allocated. She was delivered to Grace Lines Inc on 30 October.

In 1941, Grace Lines Inc sold Nightingale. She was bought by the MoWT and renamed Empire Egret. She was placed under the management of Royal Mail Lines Ltd. Her port of registry was London. The United Kingdom Official Number 168168 and Code Letters GNRN were allocated. She was now assessed as 7,248 GRT, 4,233 NRT. Empire Egret departed from New York on 20 April and arrived at Halifax, Nova Scotia, Canada four days later. She departed on 25 April, joining Convoy SA 1, which formed at sea on 30 April and arrived at the Clyde on 3 May.

Empire Egret was a member of Convoy WS 9A, which departed from Oversay, Renfrewshire on 3 June and arrived at Freetown, Sierra Leone on 18 June. She sailed two days later for Durban, South Africa, arriving on 4 July and departing five days later for Aden, where she arrived on 21 July. Empire Egret departed the next day for Suez, Egypt, arriving on 25 July. She then sailed to Port Said, from where she departed on 29 July for Alexandria, arriving later that day and departing on 5 August for Port Said, where she arrived the next day. She then sailed to Port Sudan, Sudan, from where she sailed on 11 August for Lourenço Marques, Mozambique, arriving on 24 August. She departed on 1 September for Beira, arriving two days later and departing on 8 September for Cape Town, South Africa, where she arrived on 12 September. Empire Egret departed from Cape Town on 13 September for Trinidad, where she arrived on 29 September, departing the next day for Philadelphia, Pennsylvania. She arrived at Philadelphia on 6 October, departing five days later for New York, where she arrived on 12 October. She departed on 22 October for the Hampton Roads, Virginia, arriving the next day and the sailing to Norfolk, Virginia, from where she departed in a convoy bound for Liverpool, Lancashire, United Kingdom, arriving on 5 November.

Empire Egret departed from Liverpool on 20 November bound for Newport, Monmouthshire, arriving two days later. She then sailed to the Clyde, from where she departed on 6 December to join Convoy WS 14, which departed from Oversay on 9 December and arrived at Freetown on 21 December. She departed on 25 December for Cape Town, arriving on 2 January 1942 and departing a week later to join Convoy WS 14A, which formed at sea on 19 January and dispersed off Aden on 22 January. Empire Egret arrived at Aden that day, sailing four days later for Suez, where she arrived on 30 January. She then sailed to Port Said, from where she departed on 31 January for Alexandria, arriving the next day. She departed on 19 February for Port Said, arriving the next day and then sailing to Suez, from where she departed on 22 February for Mombasa, Kenya, arriving on 2 March. Empire Egret was a member of Convoy KR 1, which departed from Kilindini Harbour on 10 March and arrived at Colombo, Ceylon on 20 March. She was carrying a cargo of artillery and vehicles, accompanied by 26 troops. She departed from Colombo on 27 March bound for Bombay, India, arriving on 3 April. She departed on 15 April for Mombasa, arriving on 21 April and sailing five days later for Beira, where she arrived on 29 April. Empire Egret departed from Beira on 2 May for Cape Town, arriving four days later and departing on 9 May for Trinidad, where she arrived on 24 May. She departed on 6 June for Baltimore, arriving on 12 June.

Empire Egret was then transferred to the United States Maritime Commission and renamed Nightingale. She was transferred to Grace Lines Inc later that year and renamed Santa Isabel. The Code Letters WCRH were allocated and her port of registry was Baltimore, Maryland.

Between 7 October 1943 and 20 January 1944 the ship was converted to a War Shipping Administration troopship by Brewer Dockyard Co, New York. On 30 April, Santa Isabel departed from Port Hueneme, California for Nouméa, New Caledonia with 1,750 troops on board. She arrived on 17 May. The ship continued in the Pacific including Okinawa until departing Los Angeles 13 February 1946 for European ports. The ship returned to New York 26 March and in April 1946 was placed in the reserve fleet in the James River.

In 1946, Santa Isabel was transferred to the USMC and renamed Guiding Star. She served until June 1973, when she was scrapped at Brownsville, Texas.
