= GWR 4000 Class =

Class of four-cylinder 4-6-0 locomotives

Great Western Railway 4000 Star class
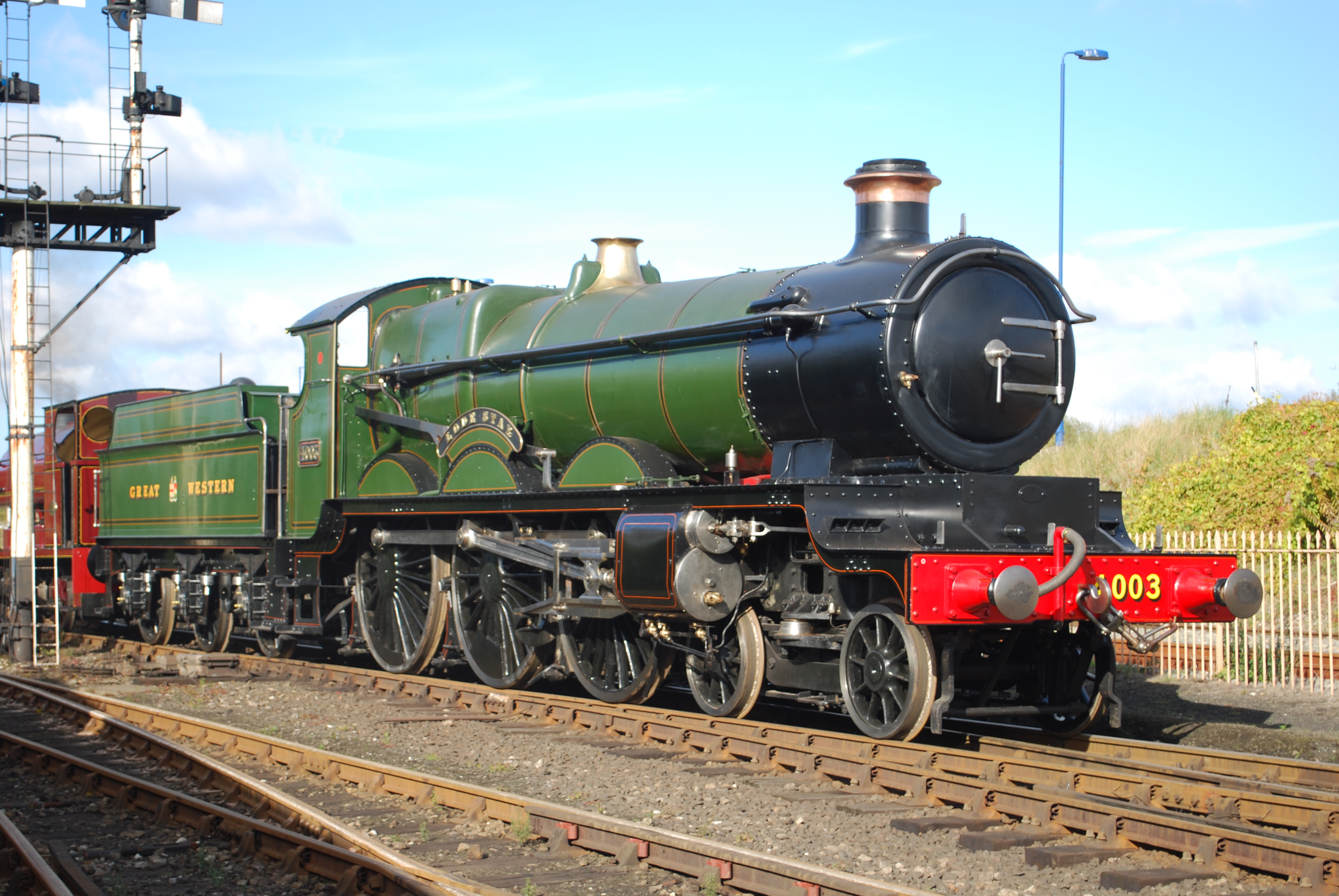
- 4003 Lode Star
Type and origin
- Power type: Steam
- Designer: George Jackson Churchward
- Builder: GWR Swindon Works
- Order number: Lots 161, 168, 173, 178, 180, 195, 199, 217
- Build date: 1906–1923
- Total produced: 73
Specifications
- Configuration
  - Whyte: 4-6-0 (prototype built as 4-4-2 but rebuilt to 4-6-0 1909).
  - UIC: 2′C h4
- Gauge: 4 ft 8 1/2 in (1,435 mm) standard gauge
- Leading dia.: 3 ft 2 in (0.965 m)
- Driver dia.: 6 ft 8 1/2 in (2.045 m)
- Trailing dia.: 4 ft 1 1/2 in (1.257 m) (4-4-2 only)
- Wheelbase: Loco: 27 ft 3 in (8.31 m)
- Loco weight: 75.8 long tons (77.0 t; 84.9 short tons)
- Tender weight: 40 long tons (41 t; 45 short tons)
- Water cap.: 3,500 or 4,000 imp gal (16,000 or 18,000 L; 4,200 or 4,800 US gal)
- Firebox
  - Grate area: 27.1 sq ft (2.52 m^{2})
- Boiler: GWR Standard No. 1 (with variations)
- Boiler pressure: 225 psi (1.55 MPa)
- Heating surface
  - Firebox: 154.8 sq ft (14.38 m^{2})
  - Tubes: 1,686.6 sq ft (156.69 m^{2})
- Superheater: "Swindon No. 3"
- Cylinders: 4, (2 outside, 2 inside)
- Cylinder size: 14 1/4 in × 26 in (362 mm × 660 mm) - 15 in × 26 in (381 mm × 660 mm)
- Valve gear: Walschaerts inside
- Valve type: Piston valves
Performance figures
- Tractive effort: 25,090 lbf (111.61 kN) - 27,800 lbf (123.66 kN)
Career
- Operators: Great Western Railway; British Railways
- Class: 4000 or Star
- Power class: GWR: D; BR: 5P
- Numbers: 4000–4072
- Axle load class: GWR: Red
- Withdrawn: 1926–1957
- Disposition: 15 rebuilt as Castle class, 1 preserved, remainder scrapped.

The Great Western Railway 4000 or Star are a class of 4-cylinder 4-6-0 passenger steam locomotives designed by George Jackson Churchward for the Great Western Railway (GWR) in 1906 and introduced from early 1907. The prototype was built as a 4-4-2 Atlantic (but converted to 4-6-0 during 1909). They proved to be a successful design which handled the heaviest long-distance express trains, reaching top speeds of 90 mph (145 km/h), and established the design principles for GWR 4-cylinder classes over the next twenty-five years.

== Background ==
After finally converting the last broad gauge lines in 1892, the GWR began a period of modernisation as new cut-off lines shortened its routes to west of England, South Wales and Birmingham. During the first decade of the twentieth century, the new Chief Mechanical Engineer, George Jackson Churchward designed or acquired a number of experimental locomotives with different wheel arrangements and boiler designs to help him plan for the future motive power needs of the railway. Following the success of the prototypes of his two-cylinder Saint class 4-6-0 locomotives, introduced in 1902, Churchward became interested in developing a more powerful 4-cylinder type for the longer non-stop express services. He therefore persuaded the GWR to acquire three French 4-cylinder 4-4-2 compound locomotives, 102 La France (1904) and 103 President and 104 Alliance (both 1905) for comparison purposes.

== Prototype ==
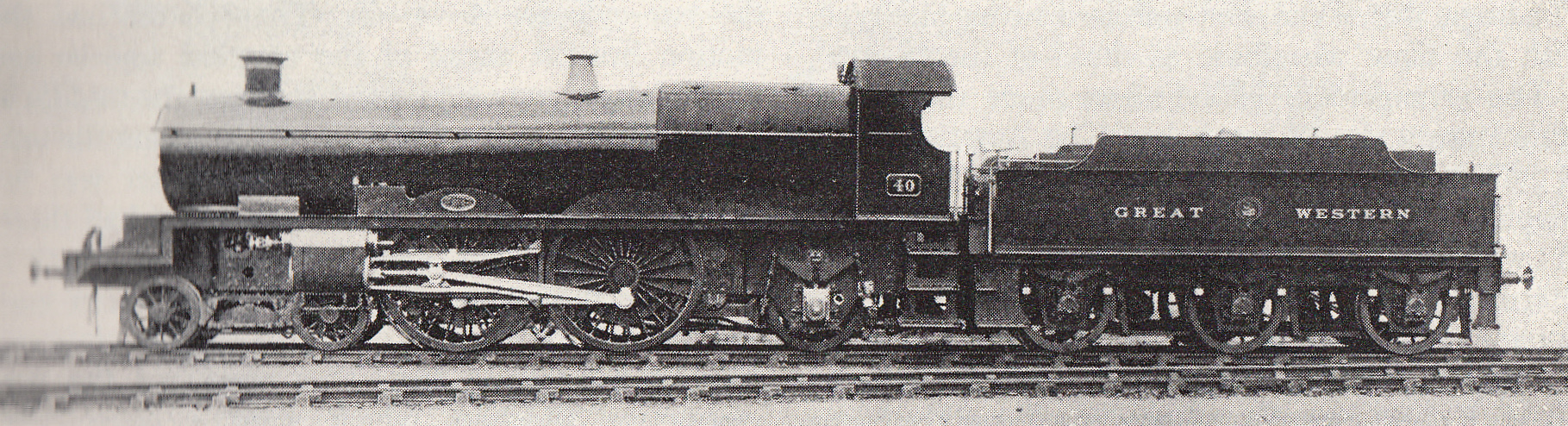
Star class prototype No. 40 as built as a 4-4-2

In addition to acquiring the French compound locomotives Churchward built and tested his own prototype 4-cylinder locomotive simple-expansion locomotive, No. 40 North Star in 1906. As with some early members of the Saint class it was built as a 4-4-2 but designed so that it could easily be converted to a 4-6-0. It was completed at the Swindon Works of the GWR (Lot 161) in April 1906. It was numbered 40 and later that year was named 'North Star'. In November 1909 it was converted to 4-6-0.

The new design incorporated many ideas from the French locomotives, in particular the four-cylinder layout, with the inside cylinders placed forward under the smokebox and the outside cylinders placed far back, in line with the rear wheels of the bogie; from this followed the divided drive with the outside cylinders connected to the second set of driving wheels whilst the inside cylinders were connected to the front set of driving wheels. The valve gear was an unusual design, called scissors gear, which eschewed the use of eccentrics, but was basically a variation on Walschaerts gear. The prototype locomotive was rebuilt as a member of the Castle Class in November 1929.

== Production series ==
During initial trials the prototype proved to be largely successful although Charles Rous-Marten commented that 'there were indications that with heavier loads, and less favourable weather, greater adhesion would be needed.' The production series were therefore all built with a 4-6-0 wheel arrangement. They also had inside Walschaerts valve gear rather than the scissors gear. Seven series of what would later be known as 'Star Class' locomotives built between 1907 and 1923 each of which contained detailed differences from the others

Table of orders and numbers
Year	Quantity	Lot No.	Works Nos.	Locomotive numbers	Notes
1906	1	161	2168	40	Built as 4-4-2; rebuilt to 4-6-0 in 1909; renumbered 4000 in 1912
1907	10	168	2229–2238	4001–4010	Star series
1908	10	173	2300–2309	4011–4020	Knight series
1909	10	178	2365–2374	4021–4030	King series (Monarch series from 1927)
1910–11	10	180	2380–2389	4031–4040	Queen series
1913	5	195	2536–2540	4041–4045	Prince series
1914	15	199	2572–2586	4046–4060	Princess series
1922–23	12	217	2919–2926	4061–4072	Abbey series

=== Star series ===
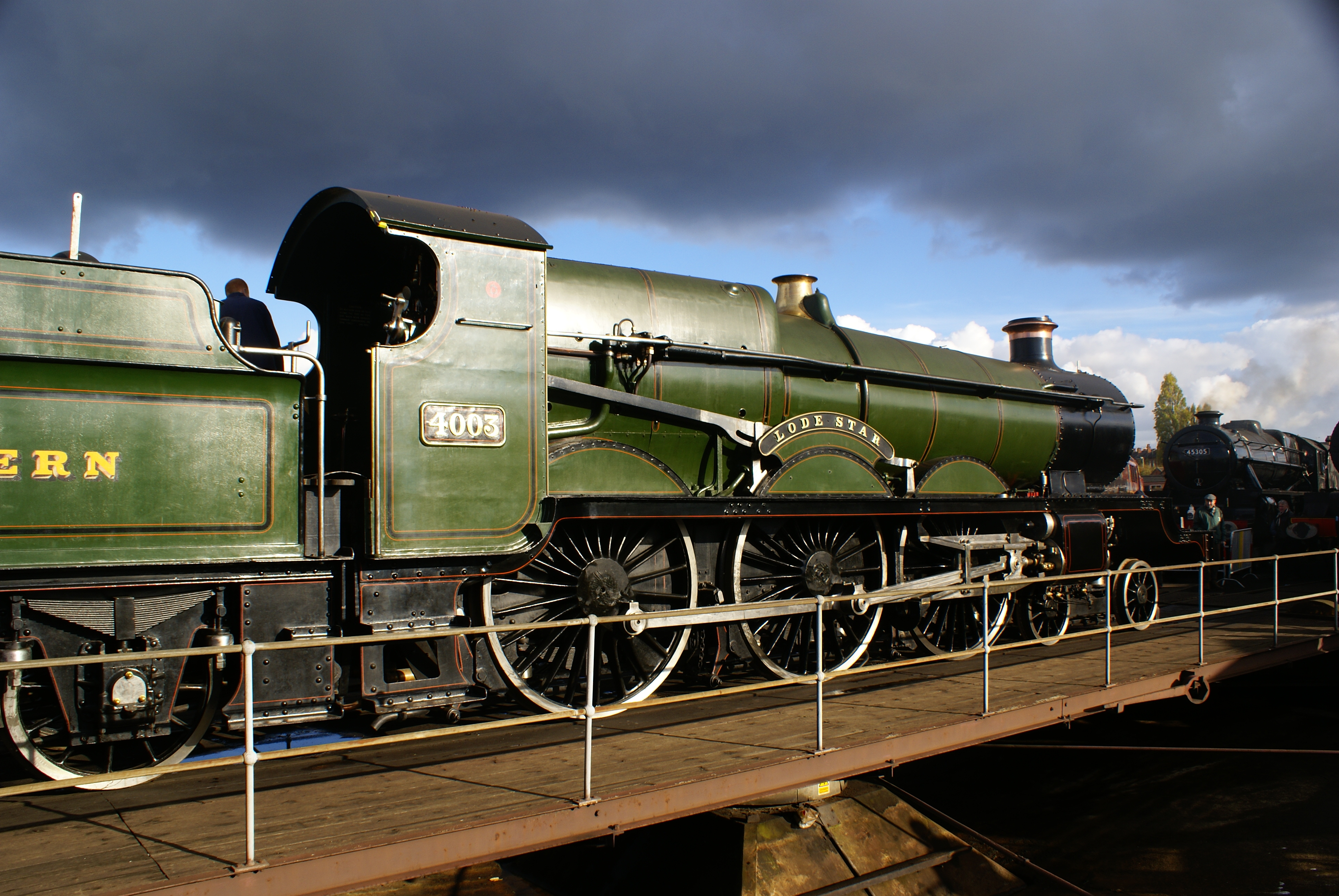
First series No. 4003 Lode Star, at Tyseley Locomotive Works

The first series of ten locomotives were built at Swindon in 1907 (Lot 168) numbered 4001–4010 and named after well-known Stars, perpetuating the names of the earlier broad gauge GWR Star Class of 1838. All except for No. 4010 Western Star were built without superheaters. No. 4010 received a 'Swindon No. 1' superheater and the remainder received superheated boilers between August 1909 and October 1912. No. 4009 Shooting Star was rebuilt as a member of the Castle Class in April 1925. The surviving members of the series were withdrawn 1932–1951, although No. 4003 Lode Star was preserved.

=== Knight series ===
A second series of ten similar locomotives appeared in 1908 (Swindon Lot 173), with improved bogies, numbered 4011–4020 and named after historical knights. Nos. 4011 was built with a Swindon No. 1 superheater, the remainder were fitted with the standard No.3 superheater between 1909 and 1911. They were withdrawn between 1932 and 1951.

=== King series ===
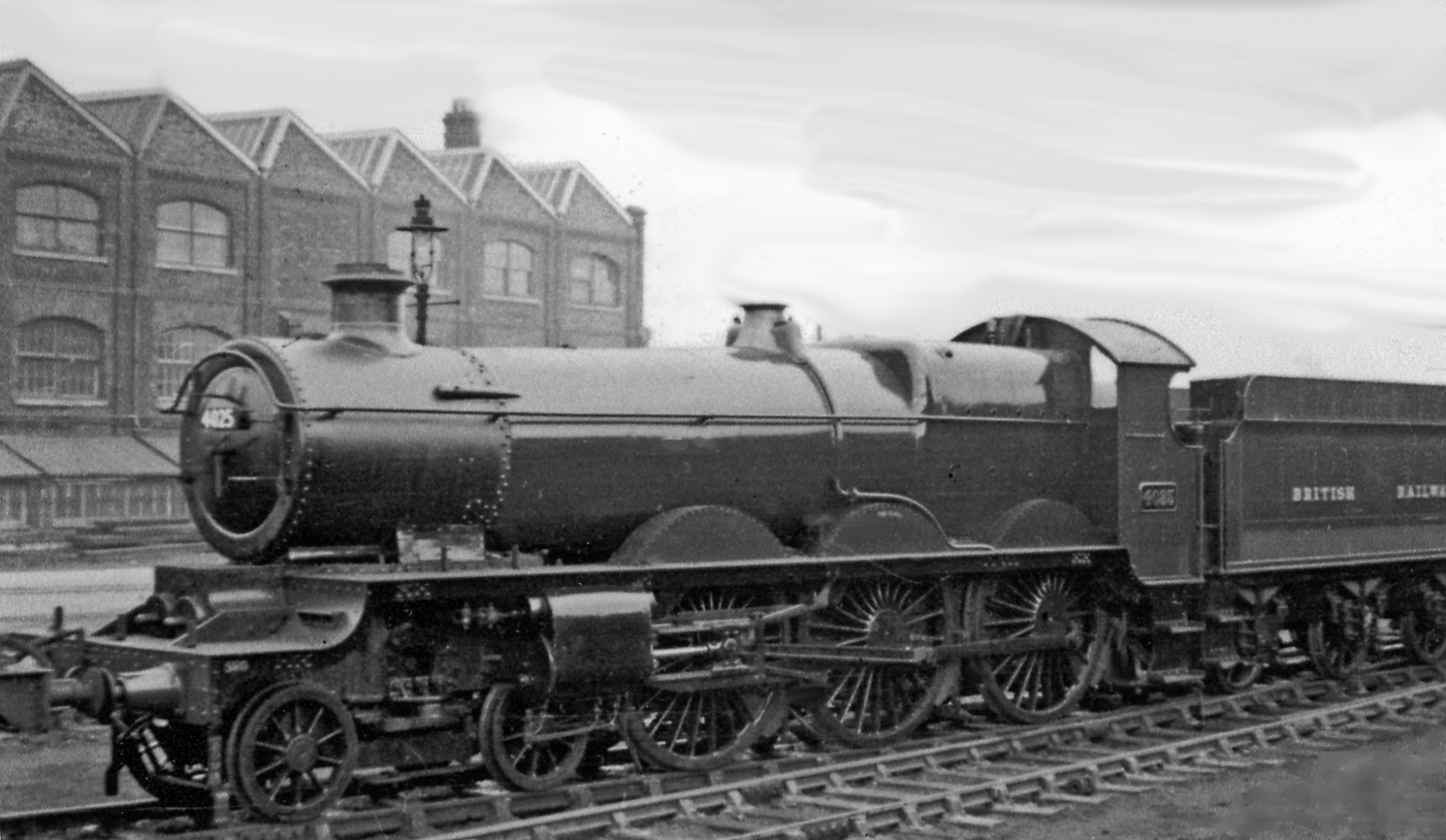
No. 4025 - after the name Italian Monarch was removed in 1940

A third series of ten further locomotives appeared during 1909 (Swindon Lot 178), numbered 4021–4030 and named after British Kings. The framing for these had curved ends under the cab and over the cylinders. In June 1909, No. 4021 King Edward was built with a Swindon No. 3 superheater but the remainder had saturated steam boilers until 1910–13. King Edward notably hauled the funeral train for the funeral of King Edward VII on 20 May 1910; the mourners included nine kings and emperors, the largest number of crowned monarchs ever to travel in the same train. The class were all renamed during 1927 to allow for their names to be used on the new King Class. Instead, they were given names of a country followed by the word 'Monarch' (e.g. The Norwegian Monarch). However, several of the names relating to enemy countries were removed during the Second World War (1940–1). They were all withdrawn between 1934 and 1952.

=== Queen series ===
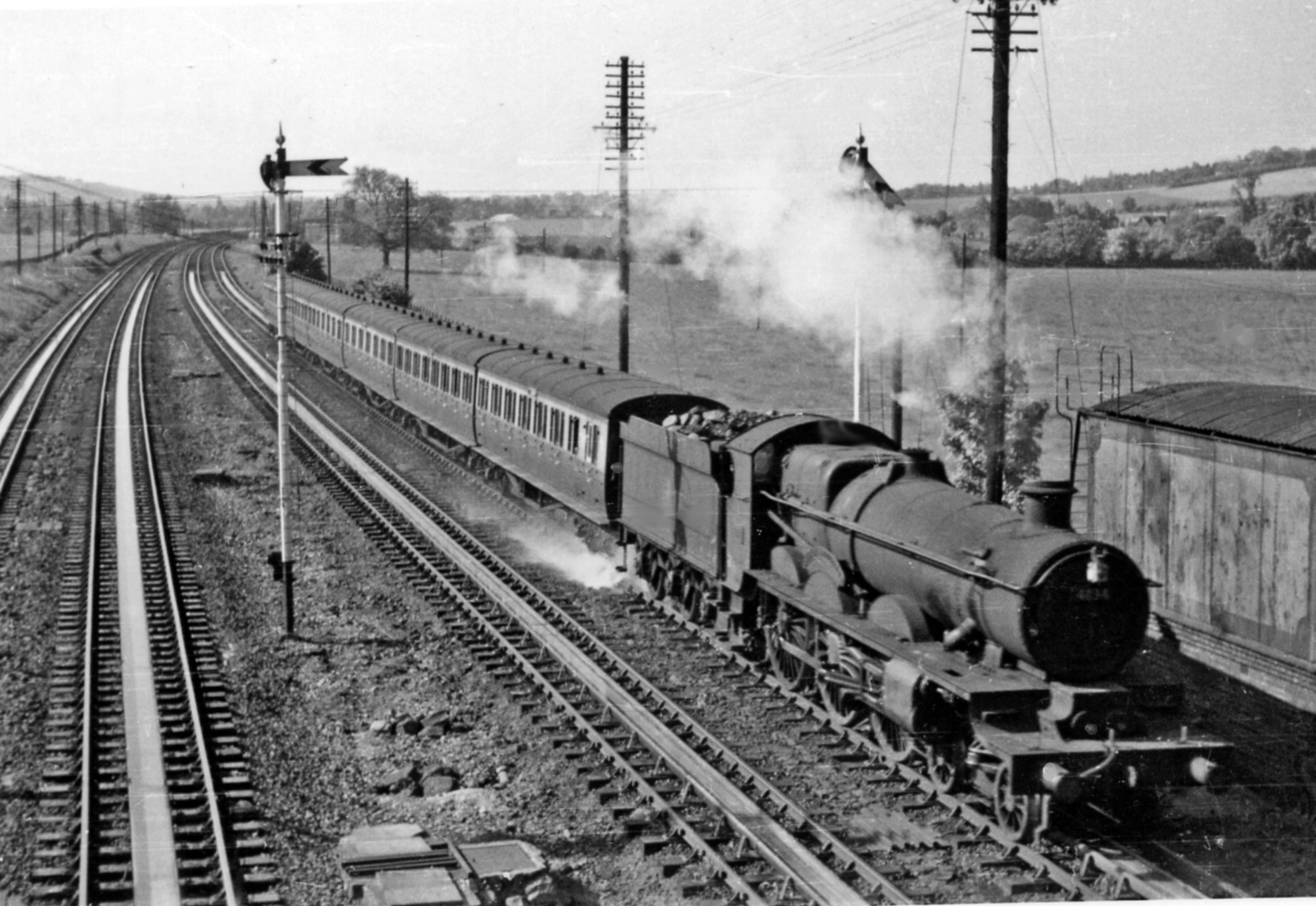
No. 4034 Queen Adelaide

A fourth series of ten further locomotives appeared during 1910 and 1911 (Swindon Lot 180). They were numbered 4031–4040 and named after British Queens. This series (and subsequent members of the class) were all built with a Swindon No. 3 superheater. This series was fitted with new style 3,500 imp gal (16,000 L; 4,200 US gal) tenders. Two examples (No. 4032 Queen Alexandra and No. 4037 Queen Philippa) were rebuilt as Castle class locomotives in 1926. The remainder were withdrawn by British Railways between 1950 and 1952.

=== Prince series ===
Five further locomotives appeared in 1913 (Swindon Lot 195). These were numbered 4041–4045 and named after the sons of King George V. No. 4041 was built with enlarged 15 in × 26 in (381 mm × 660 mm) diameter cylinders giving a tractive effort of 27,800 lbf (123.66 kN). Once this was proved to be beneficial, this size gradually became the standard for the class, as they visited the works for their periodic overhaul. The boilers were given top-feed apparatus which also later became standard for the whole class. The locomotives were all withdrawn by British Railways between 1950 and 1953.

=== Princess series ===
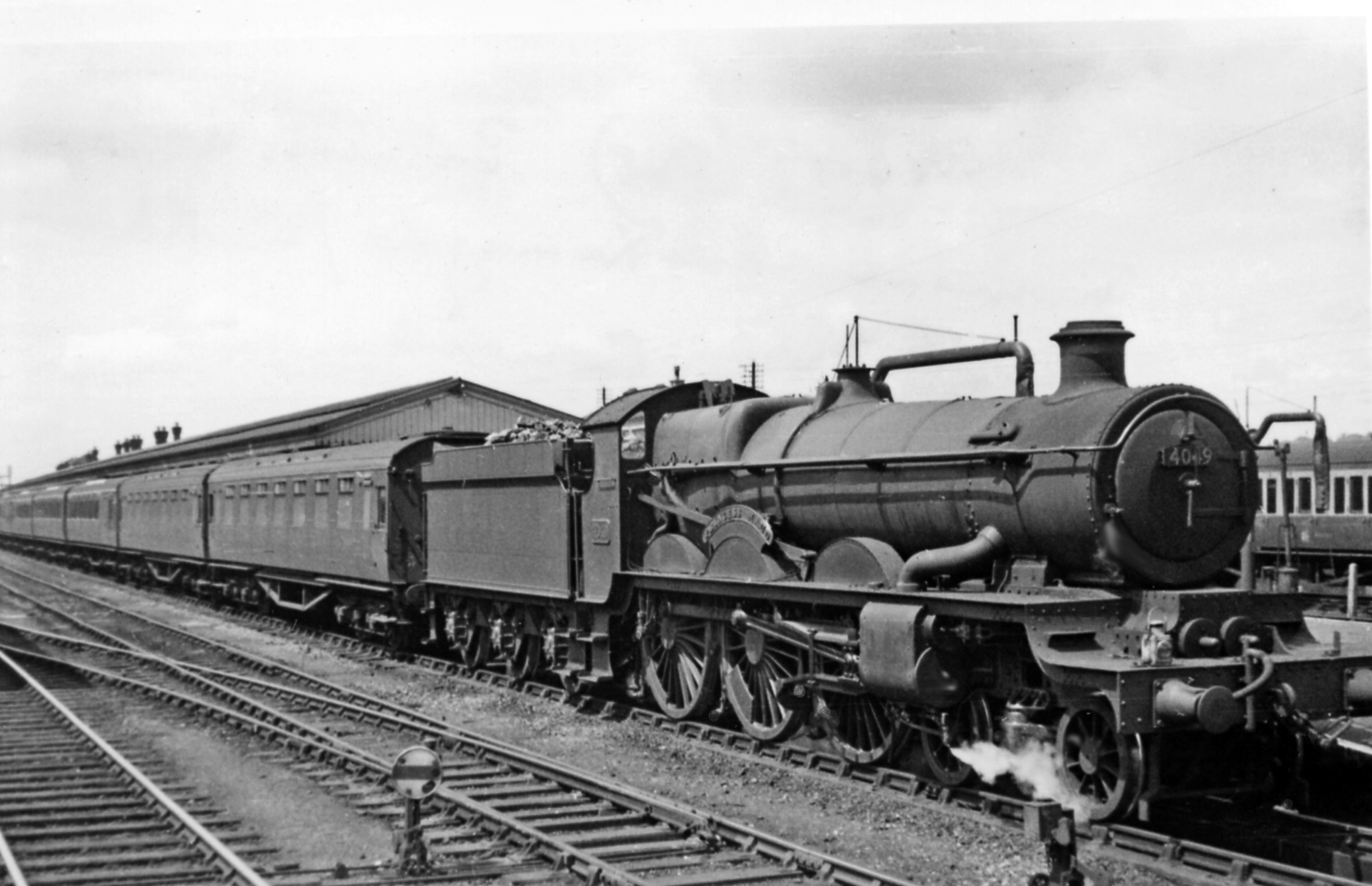
No. 4049 Princess Maud

The GWR experienced a substantial growth in long-distance passenger traffic immediately before the First World War requiring a further series of fifteen locomotives during the first six months of 1914 (Swindon Lot 199). These were numbered 4046–4060 and named after British princesses. They were all built with 15 in (381 mm) diameter cylinders and had improved boilers compared to the previous batch. They also introduced an improved four-cone vacuum ejector made necessary to improve braking on the increasingly long passenger trains. The locomotives were all withdrawn by British Railways between 1950 and 1957.

=== Abbey series ===
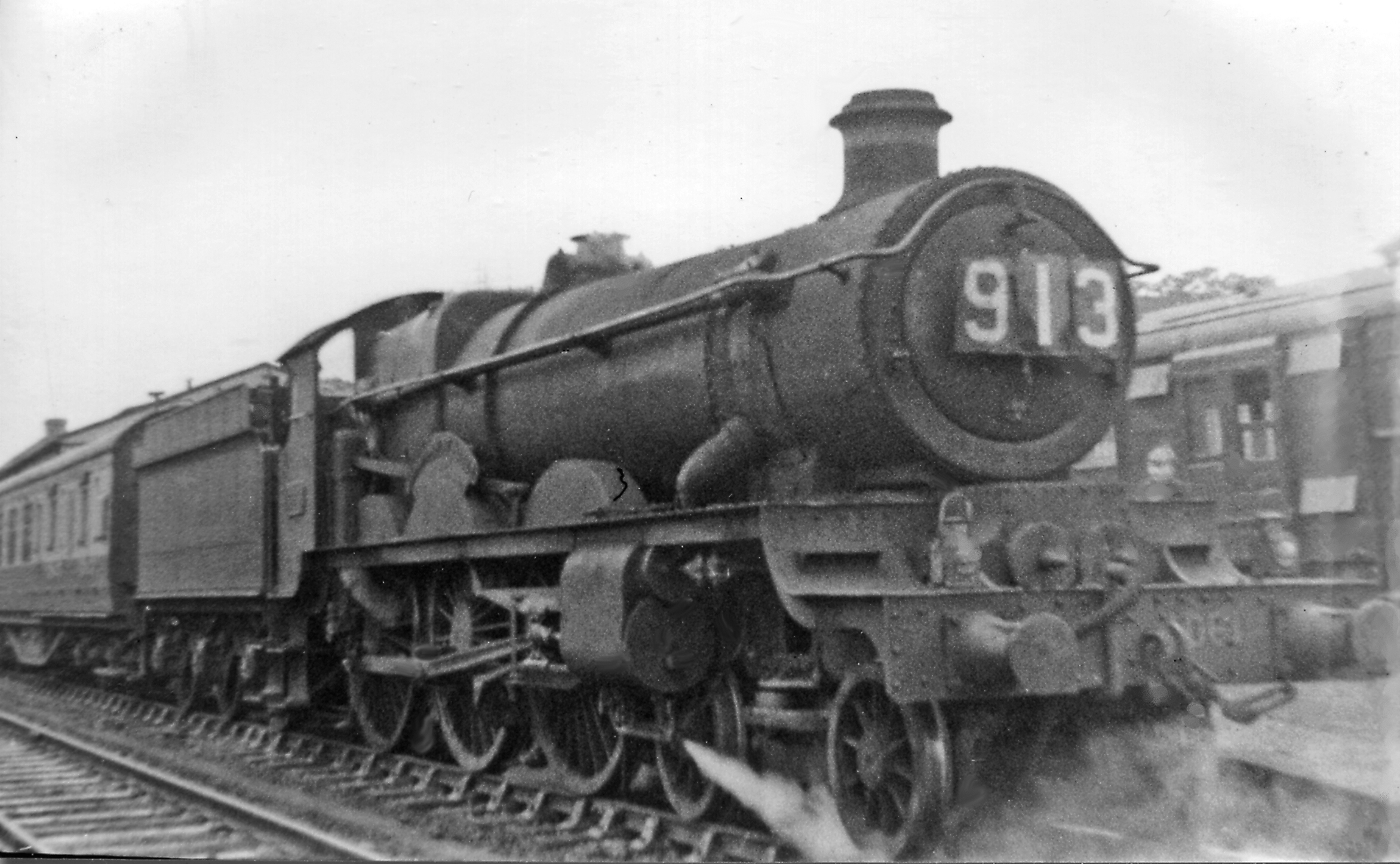
4061 Glastonbury Abbey

A final batch of twelve further locomotives appeared in 1922–1923 (Swindon Lot 217). These were numbered 4061–4072 and were named after famous Abbeys in the GWR territory. They were built with improved crank axles. In 1937 Nos. 4063–4072 were all rebuilt as Castle Class locomotives, being renumbered 5083–5092 but retaining their original names. The remaining two locomotives were withdrawn by British Railways in 1956 and 1957.

== Trials ==
The class was criticised in letters to The Engineer for being expensive to build and maintain and Churchward was asked by his Directors to explain why 'the London and North Western Railway could build three 4-6-0 locomotives for the cost of two of his.' His response was 'Because one of mine could pull two of their bloody things backwards'. As a result, there were exchange trials proposed by Churchward with a LNWR Whale Experiment Class during August 1910 which vindicated the Star Class in terms of performance and coal consumption.

== Performance ==
Members of the class performed well as passenger locomotives over all the long-distance routes of the GWR on the fastest express trains and those requiring the longest distance between stops. They gradually became displaced to secondary services by members of the Castle and King classes in the late 1920s and 1930s. Survivors continued to perform well until the mid-1950s. The 4000 class became a template for two later famous GWR 4-cylinder 4-6-0 classes - the Castle and King Class. According to le Fleming "their performance was consistently of the highest standard and they were remarkable free-running engines which rarely suffered breakdown in service. ... No engines were more aptly named than the 'Stars.'"

== Modifications ==
As already noted, between 1925 and 1940 Churchward's successor Charles Collett ordered fifteen examples to be dismantled and their parts used in the construction of new Castle class locomotives. Throughout their careers the remainder of the class was subject to detailed modifications and improvements to their boilers, smokeboxes, and steam pipes so that "the only period when the appearance of the class was approximately uniform was from 1925 to 1927". 4,000 imp gal (18,000 L; 4,800 US gal) tenders were also fitted from 1938 onwards.

== Preservation ==
One example No. 4003 Lode Star has been preserved, after it was finally withdrawn in 1951, having covered 2,005,898 miles. The locomotive was preserved at Swindon railway works until 1962, then in the Museum of the Great Western Railway until transferred to the National Railway Museum in York in 1992, where it was a static non-working exhibit. In 2010 Lode Star was moved to Steam Museum in Swindon, as a static non-working exhibit. In November 2015, 4003 was moved back to the National Railway Museum.

In August 2022 the Great Western Society's 4709 group bought the GWR 4073 Class 7027 Thornbury Castle, with the intention of using the boiler to recreate a GWR 4700 Class. A few days after the purchase the 4709 group stated that Thornbury Castle's chassis and other components, and the boiler from GWR 2800 Class No. 2861, were to be used to recreate a GWR Star class locomotive, and eventually rebuilding it back into Thornbury Castle. However, in September 2022, those plans were cancelled. Decades earlier, there were plans to utilise the boiler from GWR 2800 Class No. 2873 into a replica Star Class at Tyseley Locomotive Works, but those plans never came into fruition.

== List of locomotives ==
No.	First name	Second name	Third name	Date built	Date withdrawn	Notes
40; 4000	North Star	—	—	Apr 1906	Nov 1929	Renumbered December 1912, rebuilt as Castle Class 4000
4001	Dog Star	—	—	Feb 1907	Jan 1934	
4002	Evening Star	—	—	Mar 1907	Jun 1933	
4003	Lode Star	—	—	Feb 1907	Jul 1951	Preserved at Museum of the Great Western Railway, Swindon
4004	Morning Star	—	—	Feb 1907	Apr 1948	
4005	Polar Star	—	—	Feb 1907	Nov 1934	
4006	Red Star	—	—	Apr 1907	Nov 1932	
4007	Rising Star	Swallowfield Park	—	Apr 1907	Sep 1951	Renamed May 1937
4008	Royal Star	—	—	May 1907	Jun 1935	
4009	Shooting Star	—	—	May 1907	Apr 1925	Rebuilt as Castle Class 4009
4010	Western Star	—	—	May 1907	Nov 1934	
4011	Knight of the Garter	—	—	Mar 1908	Nov 1932	
4012	Knight of the Thistle	—	—	Mar 1908	Oct 1949	
4013	Knight of St. Patrick	—	—	Mar 1908	May 1950	
4014	Knight of the Bath	—	—	Mar 1908	Jun 1946	
4015	Knight of St. John	—	—	Mar 1908	Feb 1951	
4016	Knight of the Golden Fleece	—	—	Apr 1908	Oct 1925	Rebuilt as Castle Class 4016
4017	Knight of the Black Eagle	Knight of Liège	Knight of Liége	Apr 1908	Nov 1949	Renamed August 1914; name adjusted c. 1925 from French to Belgian spelling
4018	Knight of the Grand Cross	—	—	Apr 1908	Apr 1951	
4019	Knight Templar	—	—	May 1908	Oct 1949	
4020	Knight Commander	—	—	May 1908	Mar 1951	
4021	King Edward	The British Monarch	British Monarch	Jun 1909	Oct 1952	Renamed June 1927 and October 1927
4022	King William	The Belgian Monarch	Belgian Monarch	Jun 1909	Feb 1952	Renamed June 1927 and October 1927, name removed May 1940
4023	King George	The Danish Monarch	Danish Monarch	Jun 1909	Jul 1952	Renamed July 1927 and October 1927, name removed November 1940
4024	King James	The Dutch Monarch	Dutch Monarch	Jun 1909	Feb 1935	Renamed September 1927 and November 1927
4025	King Charles	Italian Monarch	—	Jul 1909	Aug 1950	Renamed October 1927, name removed June 1940
4026	King Richard	The Japanese Monarch	Japanese Monarch	Sep 1909	Feb 1950	Renamed July 1927 and November 1927, name removed January 1941
4027	King Henry	The Norwegian Monarch	Norwegian Monarch	Sep 1909	Oct 1934	Renamed July 1927 and November 1927
4028	King John	The Romanian Monarch	Romanian Monarch	Sep 1909	Nov 1951	Renamed July 1927 and November 1927, name removed November 1940
4029	King Stephen	The Spanish Monarch	Spanish Monarch	Oct 1909	Nov 1934	Renamed July 1927 and November 1927
4030	King Harold	The Swedish Monarch	Swedish Monarch	Oct 1909	May 1950	Renamed July 1927 and November 1927, name removed November 1940
4031	Queen Mary	—	—	Oct 1910	Jun 1951	
4032	Queen Alexandra	—	—	Oct 1910	Apr 1926	Rebuilt as Castle Class 4032
4033	Queen Victoria	—	—	Nov 1910	Jun 1951	
4034	Queen Adelaide	—	—	Nov 1910	Sep 1952	
4035	Queen Charlotte	—	—	Nov 1910	Oct 1951	
4036	Queen Elizabeth	—	—	Dec 1910	Mar 1952	
4037	Queen Philippa	—	—	Dec 1910	Jun 1926	Rebuilt as Castle Class 4037, renamed 'The South Wales Borderers'
4038	Queen Berengaria	—	—	Jan 1911	Apr 1952	
4039	Queen Matilda	—	—	Feb 1911	Nov 1950	
4040	Queen Boadicea	—	—	Mar 1911	Jun 1951	
4041	Prince of Wales	—	—	Jun 1913	Apr 1951	
4042	Prince Albert	—	—	May 1913	Nov 1951	
4043	Prince Henry	—	—	May 1913	Jan 1952	
4044	Prince George	—	—	May 1913	Feb 1953	
4045	Prince John	—	—	Jun 1913	Nov 1950	
4046	Princess Mary	—	—	May 1914	Nov 1951	
4047	Princess Louise	—	—	May 1914	Jul 1951	
4048	Princess Victoria	—	—	May 1914	Jan 1953	
4049	Princess Maud	—	—	May 1914	Jul 1953	
4050	Princess Alice	—	—	Jun 1914	Feb 1952	
4051	Princess Helena	—	—	Jun 1914	Oct 1950	
4052	Princess Beatrice	—	—	Jun 1914	Jun 1953	
4053	Princess Alexandra	—	—	Jun 1914	Jul 1954	
4054	Princess Charlotte	—	—	Jun 1914	Feb 1952	
4055	Princess Sophia	—	—	Jul 1914	Feb 1951	
4056	Princess Margaret	—	—	Jul 1914	Oct 1957	Briefly seen at 'Mallingford' station in the 1953 Ealing Comedy film "The Titfield Thunderbolt"
4057	Princess Elizabeth	—	—	Jul 1914	Feb 1952	
4058	Princess Augusta	—	—	Jul 1914	Apr 1951	
4059	Princess Patricia	—	—	Jul 1914	Sep 1952	
4060	Princess Eugenie	—	—	Jul 1914	Oct 1952	
4061	Glastonbury Abbey	—	—	May 1922	Mar 1957	
4062	Malmesbury Abbey	—	—	May 1922	Nov 1956	
4063	Bath Abbey	—	—	Nov 1922	Jun 1937	Rebuilt as Castle Class 5083
4064	Reading Abbey	—	—	Dec 1922	Apr 1937	Rebuilt as Castle Class 5084
4065	Evesham Abbey	—	—	Dec 1922	Jul 1939	Rebuilt as Castle Class 5085
4066	Malvern Abbey	Sir Robert Horne	Viscount Horne	Dec 1922	Dec 1937	Rebuilt as Castle Class 5086
4067	Tintern Abbey	—	—	Jan 1923	Nov 1940	Rebuilt as Castle Class 5087
4068	Llanthony Abbey	—	—	Jan 1923	Feb 1939	Rebuilt as Castle Class 5088
4069	Margam Abbey	Westminster Abbey	—	Jan 1923	Oct 1939	Renamed 1923. Rebuilt as Castle Class 5089
4070	Neath Abbey	—	—	Feb 1923	Apr 1939	Rebuilt as Castle Class 5090
4071	Cleeve Abbey	—	—	Feb 1923	Dec 1938	Rebuilt as Castle Class 5091
4072	Tresco Abbey	—	—	Feb 1923	Apr 1938	Rebuilt as Castle Class 5092

== Accidents and incidents ==
- On 15 April 1923, locomotive No. 4048 Princess Victoria was hauling a freight train that was in a head-on collision with a passenger train, hauled by GWR 517 Class 0-4-2T No. 215, at Curry Rivel, Somerset due to a signalman's error. Nine people were injured.

== Models ==
Hornby produce an OO scale model of 4003 Lode Star.
