= GWR 4000 Class 4003 Lode Star =

Preserved 1907 British 4-6-0 locomotive

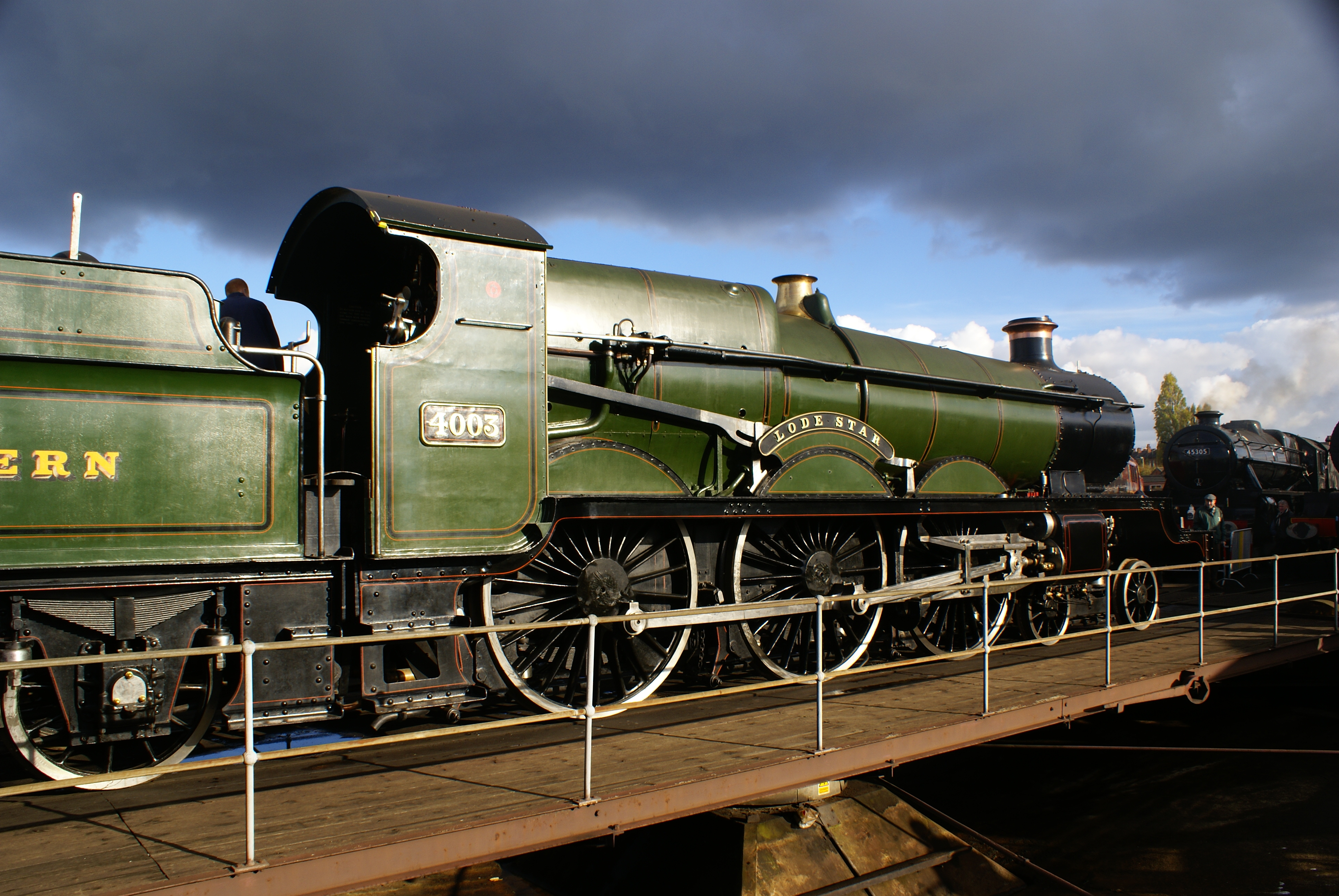
4003 Lode Star in 2010

Lode Star is the only remaining GWR 4000 Class locomotive. It is preserved at the National Railway Museum in York, England.

Lode Star was designed by George Jackson Churchward and was built in 1907, one of the first locomotives in its class to be built.

The design of the locomotive was influenced by de Glehn, a French engineer. He used four cylinders on his locomotives, which Churchward copied. By using four cylinders it meant the locomotives were both powerful and fast.

Lode Star survived into the British Railways era, and was finally withdrawn in 1951. At this point it had covered 2,005,898 miles. Lode Star was preserved at the Great Western Museum in Swindon from 1962, and was transferred to the National Railway Museum in York in 1992, where it was a static non-working exhibit. In 2010 Lode Star was moved to Steam Museum in Swindon, as a static non-working exhibit. In November 2015 it was moved back to the National Railway Museum where in June 2019 it was on the publicly open pit, permitting examination of the underneath of the locomotive including the inside cylinders and valve gear.
