= George (given name) =

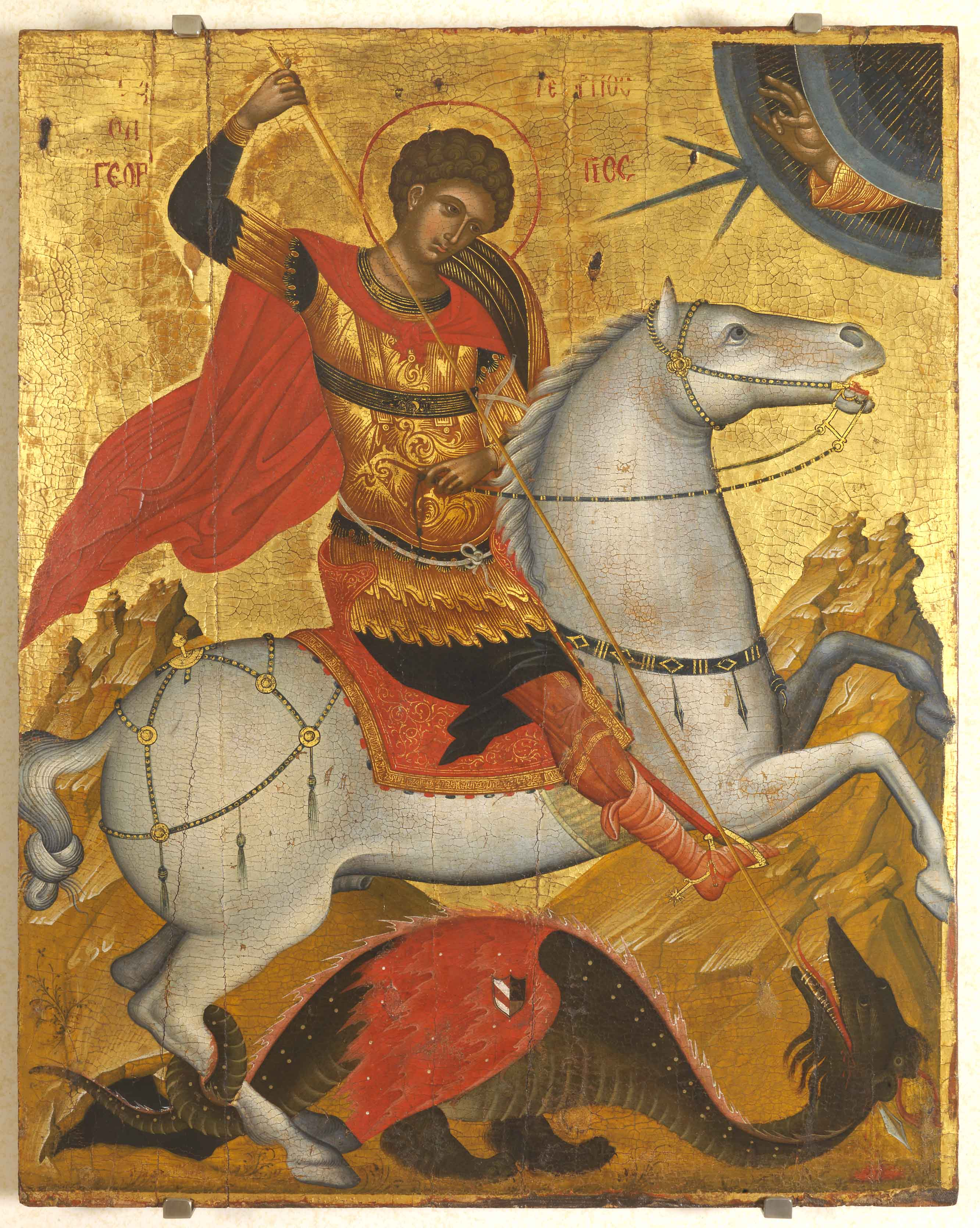
- 15th-century portrait of Saint George and the Dragon
- Pronunciation: /dʒɔːdʒ/ JORJ
- Gender: Male

Origin
- Origin: Greek
- Meaning: "farmer" "earthworker"

Other names
- Nicknames: Georgie, Geordie
- Derived: Γεώργιος (Geōrgios)
- Related names: Georges, Georginio, Georgios, Georgius, Gheorghe, Giorgi, Giorgio, Göran, Geevarghese/Varghese, Gjergj György, Ġorġ, Jerzy, Jorge, Joris, Jörg, Jörgen, Jørgen, Jørn, Jüri, Jurgis, Jurģis, Jürgen, Jurij, Juris, Örjan, Ørjan, Sjors, Yegor, Yrjö, Jyrki, Jyri, Yuri/Yury, Uri/Ori, Đorđe, Đurađ, Jiří, Juraij, Giorgis, Juraj, Jura, Jurica, Đuro, Đuka, Juran

George (English: /ˈdʒɔːrdʒ/) is a male given name derived from the Greek name Georgios (Γεώργιος; Ancient Greek: [ɡeɔ́ːrɡi.os], Modern Greek: [ʝeˈorʝi.os]). It may have been a theophoric name, with origins in Zeus Georgos, an early title of the Greek god Zeus. In the fourth century, the name gained popularity due to its association with the Christian martyr, Saint George (died 23 April 303). Its diminutives include Geordie and Georgie. Feminine forms in the Anglosphere are Georgia, Georgiana, Georgina and Georgine.

== History ==
=== Etymology and origins ===
Its original Greek form, Georgios, is based on the Greek word georgos (γεωργός), 'farmer'. The word georgos itself is ultimately a combination of two Greek words: ge (γῆ), 'earth, soil' and ergon (ἔργον), 'work'. Aelius Herodianus (fl. 2nd century AD), a Roman-era Greek grammarian and writer, determined Georgios to be a theophoric name, or a name created to honor a deity, a nod to Zeus Georgos, or "Zeus the Farmer" in English. In the early stages of Greek mythology, before Zeus took on a major role in the Greek pantheon as ruler of all the gods and goddesses, he was sacrificed to as an agricultural god, a patron of crops and harvests. The name took on religious significance to followers of Early Christianity in 303 with the supposed martyrdom of Georgios, a Roman soldier of Greek heritage. While the story's historical accuracy is subject to debate, his character took on importance to the Christian Church, with Georgios and its variants being used as baptismal names and by religious officials and Christian monarchs, though it did not become common among the laity until after the Middle Ages.

Six British kings have been named George, with King George III nicknamed Farmer George by virtue of his practical interests which aptly refers back to the etymology of Zeus the Farmer. The US state of Georgia was named for King George II but the Caucasian country 'Georgia' is probably derived from the Persian for 'wolf'- gurj, assimilated with the Christian Saint George.

== Forms ==
=== In other languages ===
- Avar: Георгий (Georgij), Джордж (Džordž)
- Abkhazian: Гьаргь (G’arg’), Џьорџь (J’orj’)
- Albanian: Gjergj, Gjorgj, Xhorxh, Jorgji
- Amharic: Giorgis (ጊዮርጊስ)
- Arabic: Jirjīs (جرجيس), Jirjis (جرجس), Jawrj (جورج)
  - Egyptian Arabic: Gerges (جرجس), Girgis (جرجس)
  - Palestinian Arabic: Jiryes (جريس)
- Aragonese: Chorche
- Aramaic: Gewargis (ܓܝܘܪܓܝܣ), Gevargis, Gaggi (diminutive), Gaggo (diminutive), Givo (diminutive)
- Armenian: Gevorg (Գևորգ), Kevork (Western)
- Aromanian: Yioryi, Ioryi, Yoryi
- Asturian: Xurde
- Azerbaijani: Cərcis, Corcius, Corc
- Basque: Gorka, Jurgi, Urtzi
- Bosnian: Džordž
- Belarusian: Hieorhiy (Георгій), Yury (Юры), Yurka (Юрка) (diminutive)
- Breton: Jor, Jord
- Bulgarian: Georgi (Георги)
- Cantonese: 乔治 (Kìuhjih), 佐治 (Jojih),
- Catalan: Jordi
- Chinese: 喬治 (Qiáozhì),
- Chinese: 乔治 (Qiáozhì),
- Chechen: Георгий (Gеorgiy)
- Coptic: Georgios (Ⲅⲉⲟⲣⲅⲓⲟⲥ), Girgis (Ⲅⲓⲣⲅⲓⲥ)
- Czech: Jiří
- Danish: Jørgen, Jørn
- Dutch: Joris, Juriaan/Juriaen (archaic spelling), Joren, Sjors
- Dyula: Zɔrizi, Jorji
- English: Geordie (diminutive), George, Georgie (diminutive)
- Estonian: Georg, Jüri, Jürgen
- Faroese: Jørundur
- Fijian: Joji, Jojiji
- French: Georges
- Finnish: Jori, Jyri, Jyrki, Yrjänä, Yrjö
- Fon: Jɔji
- Frisian: Jurjen
- Galician: Xurxo
- Georgian: Gio (გიო) (diminutive), Giorgi (გიორგი), Gia (გია) (diminutive), Goga (გოგა) (diminutive), Gogi (გოგი) (diminutive)
- German: Georg, Jockel (diminutive), Jörg, Jörgen, Jürgen, Schorsch
- Greek: Geórgios (Γεώργιος) (Modern), Geṓrgios (Γεώργιος) (Koine), Tzortz (Τζορτζ) (English)
- Hindi: Jorj (जॉर्ज)
- Hungarian: György
- Icelandic: Georg
- Indonesian: Georgius, George
- Irish: Seóirse (also Seoirse)
- Italian: Giorgio, Giorgino (diminutive), Gino (diminutive)
- Kanuri: Jorji
- Korean: 성 조지 (Seong Joji)
- Kurdish: Gurc
- Latin: Georgius
- Latgalian: Jurs, Džordžs
- Latvian: Georgijs, Georgs, Jurģis, Juris
- Lithuanian: Georgijus, Jurgis
- Limburgish: Jorge.
- Luo: Jojrji
- Macedonian: Gjorgji (Ѓорѓи), Gjorgje (Ѓорѓе), Gjorgjija Ѓорѓија (Gjorgjija), Gjoko (Ѓоко)
- Malayalam: Geevarghese (ഗീവര്ഗീസ്) (when referring to Saint George), Varghese (വര്ഗീസ്); Jorjj (ജോർജ്ജ്) (based on the English pronunciation)
- Fulani: Joorji
- Maltese: Ġorġ
- Manx: Shorys
- Māori: Hori
- Monegasque: Giorgi
- Norman: Jore
- Norwegian: Georg, Jørn, Ørjan, Jørgen
- Occitan: Jòrdi
- Persian: Jurjis (جرجیس)
- Polish: Jerzy, Jur, Jurek, (diminutive), Juras (diminutive)
- Portuguese: Jorge
- Romanian: George, Gheorghe, Georgiu
- Russian: Георгий (Gheorghy) with diminutives Гога (Goga), Жора (Zhora) and Гоша (Gosha), Юрий (Yury) with diminutive Юра (Yura) and Егор (Yegor).
- Samoan: Siaosi
- Scots: Dod, Doddie
- Scottish Gaelic: Deòrsa, Seòras
- Serbo-Croatian: Đorđe (Ђорђе), Đorđo (Ђорђо), Đukan (Ђукан), Đurađ (Ђурађ), Đurđe (Ђурђе), Đoko (Ђоко), Đoka (Ђока), Đuro (Ђуро), Đura (Ђура), Georgije (Георгије), Juraj (Јурај), Jure (Јуре), Jurica (Јурица)
- Slovak: Juraj
- Slovene: Jure, Jurij
- Syriac: Gīwargīs (ܓܹܝܘܲܪ)
- Spanish: Jorge
- Swedish: Georg, Göran, Jörgen, Jörn, Örjan
- Tamil: Jārj (ஜார்ஜ்)
- Thai: Čhort (จอร์จ; based on the English pronunciation), Yod (ยอด; a historical distorted interpretation of the name)
- Tibetan: Rdorje (རྡོ་རྗེ།)
- Tamazight: ⴵⵓⵕⴵ (), ⵊⵓⵕⵊ ()
- Tongan: Siaosi
- Turkmen: Jorj
- Turkish: Cercis, Circis, Curcis, Yorgi, Gürcü
- Ukrainian: Heorhiy (Георгій), Yehor (Єгор), Yurii, Yuriy, Yuri (Юрій)
- Upper Sorbian: Jurij
- Uzbek: Jorj
- Venetian: Xorxi, Zorzi
- Waray: Jorge
- Welsh: Siôr
- Yakut: Джордж (Džordž), Георгий (Georgiy),

=== Feminine forms ===
- Bulgarian: Gergana (Гергана), Георгия
- Albanian: Jorgjia, Jorgjica, Gjeorgjina, Gjorgjina, Xheorxhina, Xhorxhina
- Catalan: Jordina
- Czech: Jiřina
- Dutch: Georgina, Jorien
- English: Georgeanna, Georgann, Georgia, Georgiana, Georgina, Georgie (diminutive), Gina (diminutive, also Geena), Georgette, Georenn
- French: George, Georgette, Georgine, Gigi
- Greek: Georgia (Γεωργία)
- Hungarian: Györgyi, Györgyike (diminutive)
- Italian: Giorgia, Giorgina (diminutive), Gina (diminutive)
- Latin: Georgia
- Maltese: Ġorġa
- Polish: Georgina
- Portuguese: Jorgina
- Romanian: Georgeta, Georgiana
- Spanish: Georgina, Jorgelina
- Turkish: Yorgiya

== People ==
=== Rulers and aristocrats ===
Ordered chronologically where feasible.

- King George (disambiguation)
- Prince George (disambiguation)
- George I (disambiguation)
- George II (disambiguation)
- George III (disambiguation)
- George IV (disambiguation)
- George V (disambiguation)
- George VI (disambiguation)
- George VII (disambiguation)
- George VII (disambiguation)
- George (Ongud king) (c. 1250–1298/1299), king of the Ongud and an official of the Yuan dynasty
- George, Emperor of Trebizond (c. 1255–after 1284)
- George VIII of Georgia (1415/1417–1476), King of Georgia and, as George I, King of Kakheti
- George Plantagenet, 1st Duke of Clarence (1449–1478)
- George, Duke of Saxony (1471–1539)
- George, Duke of Coimbra (1481–1550), Portuguese Infante, natural son of King John II of Portugal
- George Boleyn, Viscount Rochford (1504–1536), Tudor poet and diplomat, brother of Anne Boleyn
- George of Lencastre, 2nd Duke of Aveiro (1548–1578)
- George Gordon Byron, 6th Baron Byron, better known as Lord Byron (1788–1824), English author

=== Religious figures ===
- Saint George of Lydda (died 303), Christian Martyr and Roman soldier
- George of Laodicea (died 347), ancient Roman bishop of Laodicea
- George of Cappadocia (died 361), ancient Roman bishop of Alexandria
- George of Izla (died 615), East Syriac martyr, theologian and interpreter
- Patriarch George I of Alexandria (fl. 621–631), Greek Orthodox Greek Patriarch of Alexandria
- George I of Constantinople (died 686), Ecumenical Patriarch of Constantinople and Eastern Orthodox saint
- George II of Antioch, Greek Orthodox Patriarch of Antioch (691–702)
- George of Beltan (758–790), Patriarch of Antioch and head of the Syriac Orthodox Church
- George Syncellus (died after 810), Byzantine chronicler and ecclesiastical official
- George Choiroboskos, early 9th-century Byzantine grammarian and deacon
- George Hamartolos, 9th-century Byzantine monk
- George II of Armenia, Catholicos of the Apostolic Armenian Church (877–897)
- Patriarch George II of Alexandria, Greek Patriarch of Alexandria (1021–1052)
- George of Chqondidi (died c. 1118), Archbishop of Chqondidi and advisor to King David IV of Georgia
- George II of Constantinople (died 1198), Ecumenical Patriarch of Constantinople
- George Beseb'ely (1595–1670), Maronite Patriarch of Antioch
- George (archbishop of Cyprus) (born 1949), Eastern Orthodox Archbishop of Nova Justiniana and All Cyprus
- George of Antioch (disambiguation), various clergymen from the 9th to the 19th centuries

=== Others ===
==== Pre-modern world ====
- George of Cyprus (geographer), Greek Byzantine geographer of the early seventh century
- George of Pisidia, 7th-century Byzantine poet
- George of Resh'aina, 7th-century Syriac historian
- George of Antioch (c. 1080–1151 or 1152), court official and admiral in the Norman Kingdom of Sicily
- George Akropolites (1217 or 1220–1282), Byzantine Greek diplomat, military leader and historian
- George Sphrantzes (1401–c. 1478), Byzantine Greek historian and Imperial courtier
- George of Trebizond (1395–1486), Byzantine Greek philosopher, scholar and humanist

==== Modern world ====
===== A =====
- George Abbey (disambiguation)
- George Abbott (disambiguation)
- George Abell (disambiguation)
- George Abercromby (disambiguation)
- George Abraham (disambiguation)
- George Ackerman (disambiguation)
- George Acworth (disambiguation)
- George Adams (disambiguation)
- George Addison (disambiguation)
- George Affleck (disambiguation)
- George Agar (disambiguation)
- George Agnew (disambiguation)
- George Ainslie (disambiguation)
- George Aitken (disambiguation)
- George Albert (disambiguation)
- George Alexander Albrecht (businessman) (1834–1898), German cotton merchant and philanthropist
- George Alexander Albrecht (1935–2021), German conductor and composer, great-grandson of the above
- George Albright (disambiguation)
- George Alcorn (disambiguation)
- George Alden (disambiguation)
- George Alderink (1889–1977), American businessman and politician
- George Aldridge (disambiguation)
- George Alexander (disambiguation)
- George Allan (disambiguation)
- George Allen (disambiguation)
- George Allman (disambiguation)
- George Allsopp (disambiguation)
- George Altman (disambiguation)
- George Alvarez (disambiguation)
- George Anderson (disambiguation)
- George Andrews (disambiguation)
- George Angus (disambiguation)
- George Anson (disambiguation)
- George Anthony (disambiguation)
- George Appo (1856–1930), American pickpocket and fraudster
- George Arbuthnot (disambiguation)
- George Archer (disambiguation)
- George Archibald (disambiguation)
- George Ariyoshi (1926–2026), American lawyer and politician
- George Armstrong (disambiguation)
- George Armitage (disambiguation)
- George Armitstead (disambiguation)
- George Armytage (disambiguation)
- George Arnold (disambiguation)
- George Arthur (disambiguation)
- George Ashburnham (disambiguation)
- George Ashby (disambiguation)
- George Ashe (disambiguation)
- George Ashman (disambiguation)
- George Atherton (disambiguation)
- George Atkins (disambiguation)
- George Atkinson (disambiguation)
- George Auchinleck (disambiguation)
- George Austen (disambiguation)
- George Austin (disambiguation)
- George Avery (disambiguation)

===== B =====
- George Babb (disambiguation)
- George Babcock (disambiguation)
- George Bacon (disambiguation)
- George Badger (disambiguation)
- George Baer (disambiguation)
- George Bagby (disambiguation)
- George Bagley (disambiguation)
- George Bagration (disambiguation)
- George Bailey (disambiguation)
- George Baillie (disambiguation)
- George Bain (disambiguation)
- George Baines (disambiguation)
- George Baird (disambiguation)
- George Baker (disambiguation)
- George Baldwin (disambiguation)
- George Balfour (disambiguation)
- George Ball (disambiguation)
- George Ballard (disambiguation)
- George Balleine (disambiguation)
- George Bampfylde (disambiguation)
- George Bancroft (disambiguation)
- George Banks (disambiguation)
- George Barber (disambiguation)
- George Barbier (disambiguation)
- George Barbour (disambiguation)
- George Barclay (disambiguation)
- George Barker (disambiguation)
- George Barlow (disambiguation)
- George Barnard (disambiguation)
- George Barne (disambiguation)
- George Barnes (disambiguation)
- George Barnett (disambiguation)
- George Barr (disambiguation)
- George Barret (disambiguation)
- George Barrett (disambiguation)
- George Barrington (disambiguation)
- George Barris (disambiguation)
- George Barrow (disambiguation)
- George Barry (disambiguation)
- George Barstow (disambiguation)
- George Bartholomew (disambiguation)
- George Bartlett (disambiguation)
- George Bartley (disambiguation)
- George Barton (disambiguation)
- George Bass (disambiguation)
- George Bassett (disambiguation)
- George Batchelder (disambiguation)
- George Batcheller (disambiguation)
- George Bates (disambiguation)
- George Batten (disambiguation)
- George Baxter (disambiguation)
- George Bean (disambiguation)
- George Beard (disambiguation)
- George Beare (disambiguation)
- George Beattie (disambiguation)
- George Beatty (disambiguation)
- George Beauclerk (disambiguation)
- George Beaumont (disambiguation)
- George Beck (disambiguation)
- George Becker (disambiguation)
- George Beckley (disambiguation)
- George Beckwith (disambiguation)
- George Beet (disambiguation)
- George Behlman (1944–2014), American racing driver
- George Bell (disambiguation)
- George Bellamy (disambiguation)
- George Bemis (disambiguation)
- George Benjamin (disambiguation)
- George Bennett (disambiguation)
- George Benson (disambiguation)
- George Bentinck (disambiguation)
- George Bentley (disambiguation)
- George Beresford (disambiguation)
- George Berkeley (disambiguation)
- George Berry (disambiguation)
- George Bertram (disambiguation)
- George Best (disambiguation)
- George Bethune (disambiguation)
- George Betts (disambiguation)
- George Bickham (disambiguation)
- George Bickley (disambiguation)
- George Tyler Bigelow (1810–1878), chief justice of the Massachusetts Supreme Judicial Court
- George Bingham (disambiguation)
- George Birch (disambiguation)
- George Bird (disambiguation)
- George Bishop (disambiguation)
- George Bissell (disambiguation)
- George Bisset (disambiguation)
- George Black (disambiguation)
- George Blackburn (disambiguation)
- George Blacker (disambiguation)
- George Blackwell (disambiguation)
- George Blades (disambiguation)
- George Blair (disambiguation)
- George Blake (disambiguation)
- George Robert Blakey, American attorney and emeritus law professor
- George Bland (disambiguation)
- George Blanchard (disambiguation)
- George Bliss (disambiguation)
- George Bloomer (disambiguation)
- George Blount (disambiguation)
- George Blumenthal (disambiguation)
- George Boardman (disambiguation)
- George Bogle (disambiguation)
- George Boleyn (disambiguation)
- George Bollinger (disambiguation)
- George Bolton (disambiguation)
- George Bond (disambiguation)
- George Booth (disambiguation)
- George Borg (disambiguation)
- George Borrow (1803-1881), English Writer
- George Borwick (disambiguation)
- George Boscawen (disambiguation)
- George Boughton (disambiguation)
- George Bourchier (disambiguation)
- George Bourne (disambiguation)
- George Bowden (disambiguation)
- George Bowen (disambiguation)
- George Bower (disambiguation)
- George Bowers (disambiguation)
- George Bowes (disambiguation)
- George Bowles (disambiguation)
- George Bowman (disambiguation)
- George Bowyer (disambiguation)
- George Boyce (disambiguation)
- George Boyd (disambiguation)
- George Boyle (disambiguation)
- George Bradbury (disambiguation)
- George Bradley (disambiguation)
- George Bradshaw (disambiguation)
- George Brady (disambiguation)
- George Brand (disambiguation)
- George Branković (disambiguation)
- George Braxton (disambiguation)
- George Brennan (disambiguation)
- George Brent (disambiguation)
- George Brett (disambiguation)
- George Brewer (disambiguation)
- George Brewster (disambiguation)
- George Bridgeman (disambiguation)
- George Bridges (disambiguation)
- George Briggs (disambiguation)
- George Bright (disambiguation)
- George Brimhall (disambiguation)
- George Bristow (disambiguation)
- George Britton (disambiguation)
- George Broadbent (disambiguation)
- George Brock (disambiguation)
- George Brodie (disambiguation)
- George Brodrick (disambiguation)
- George Bromley (disambiguation)
- George Brooke (disambiguation)
- George Brooks (disambiguation)
- George Broun (disambiguation)
- George Brown (disambiguation)
- George Browne (disambiguation)
- George Browning (disambiguation)
- George Bruce (disambiguation)
- George Brudenell (disambiguation)
- George Brudenell-Bruce (disambiguation)
- George Brunner (disambiguation)
- George Brush (disambiguation)
- George Bryan (disambiguation)
- George Bryant (disambiguation)
- George Brydges (disambiguation)
- George Bryson (disambiguation)
- George Buchanan (disambiguation)
- George Buckley (disambiguation)
- George Buist (disambiguation)
- George Bull (disambiguation)
- George Bullard (disambiguation)
- George Bullen (disambiguation)
- George Bullock (disambiguation)
- George Bulman (disambiguation)
- George Bunn (disambiguation)
- George Burdett (disambiguation)
- George Burditt (disambiguation)
- George Burgess (disambiguation)
- George Burke (disambiguation)
- George Burleigh (disambiguation)
- George Burley (disambiguation)
- George Burling (disambiguation)
- George Burnett (disambiguation)
- George Burns (disambiguation)
- George Burrard (disambiguation)
- George Burrell (disambiguation)
- George Burrows (disambiguation)
- George Burt (disambiguation)
- George Burton (disambiguation)
- George Bush (disambiguation)
- George Butler (disambiguation)
- George Butt (disambiguation)
- George Butterfield (disambiguation)
- George Butterworth (disambiguation)
- George Byers (disambiguation)
- George Byng (disambiguation)
- George Byron (disambiguation)

===== C =====
- George Cadogan (disambiguation)
- George Cahill (disambiguation)
- George Caldwell (disambiguation)
- George Callender (disambiguation)
- George Calvert (disambiguation)
- George Cambridge (disambiguation)
- George Cameron (disambiguation)
- George Campbell (disambiguation)
- George Canning (disambiguation)
- George Cannon (disambiguation)
- George Carew (disambiguation)
- George Carey (disambiguation)
- George Carleton (disambiguation)
- George Carlin (1937–2008), American stand-up comedian, actor, social critic, and author
- George Carlson (disambiguation)
- George Carnegie (disambiguation)
- George Carpenter (disambiguation)
- George Carr (disambiguation)
- George Carroll (disambiguation)
- George Carson (disambiguation)
- George Carstairs (disambiguation)
- George Carter (disambiguation)
- George Cartwright (disambiguation)
- George Carver (disambiguation)
- George Cary (disambiguation)
- George Case (disambiguation)
- George Casey (disambiguation)
- George Cassidy (disambiguation)
- George Castle (disambiguation)
- George Cathie (disambiguation)
- George Catlin (disambiguation)
- George Cave (disambiguation)
- George Cavendish (disambiguation)
- George Ceara (1880/1881–1939), Aromanian poet and prose writer
- George Chadwick (disambiguation)
- George Challis (disambiguation)
- George Chalmers (disambiguation)
- George Chamberlain (disambiguation)
- George Chambers (disambiguation)
- George Champion (disambiguation)
- George Chan (disambiguation)
- George Chance (disambiguation)
- George Chandler (disambiguation)
- George Chapman (disambiguation)
- George Charles (disambiguation)
- George Chase (disambiguation)
- George Chatterton (disambiguation)
- George Cherry (disambiguation)
- George Chetwynd (disambiguation)
- George Cheyne (disambiguation)
- George Chichester (disambiguation)
- George Chisholm (disambiguation)
- George Cholmondeley (disambiguation)
- George Christensen (disambiguation)
- George Christian (disambiguation)
- George Christie (disambiguation)
- George Christopher (disambiguation)
- George D. Chryssides (born 1945), British academic
- George Chubb (disambiguation)
- George Church (disambiguation)
- George Churchill (disambiguation)
- George Cisar (disambiguation)
- George Clancy (disambiguation)
- George Clanton (born 1988), American electronic musician
- George Clare (disambiguation)
- George Clark (disambiguation)
- George Clarke (disambiguation)
- George Clay (disambiguation)
- George Clayton (disambiguation)
- George Clements (disambiguation)
- George Clerk (disambiguation)
- George Clifford (disambiguation)
- George Clinton (disambiguation)
- George Clive (disambiguation)
- George Clooney (born 1961), American actor, film producer, director and activist
- George Clymer (disambiguation)
- George Coats (disambiguation)
- George Cobb (disambiguation)
- George Cobham (disambiguation)
- George Cochran (disambiguation)
- George Cockburn (disambiguation)
- George Cockerill (disambiguation)
- George Coe (disambiguation)
- George Coghill (disambiguation)
- George Cohen (disambiguation)
- George Cole (disambiguation)
- George Coleman (disambiguation)
- George Coles (disambiguation)
- George Collier (disambiguation)
- George Collins (disambiguation)
- George Colman (disambiguation)
- George Colton (disambiguation)
- George Compton (disambiguation)
- George Comstock (disambiguation)
- George Conn (disambiguation)
- George Connell (disambiguation)
- George Connor (disambiguation)
- George Constantine (disambiguation)
- George Converse (disambiguation)
- George Conway (disambiguation)
- George Cook (disambiguation)
- George Cooke (disambiguation)
- George Cooper (disambiguation)
- George Coote (disambiguation)
- George Cope (disambiguation)
- George Corbett (disambiguation)
- George Corliss (disambiguation)
- George Cornelius (disambiguation)
- George Cornewall (disambiguation)
- George Corrie (disambiguation)
- George Cory (disambiguation)
- George Cotterill (disambiguation)
- George Cotton (disambiguation)
- George Courtauld (disambiguation)
- George Courtenay (disambiguation)
- George Coventry (disambiguation)
- George Cowles (disambiguation)
- George Cowper (disambiguation)
- George Cox (disambiguation)
- George Crabb (disambiguation)
- George Craig (disambiguation)
- George Cram (disambiguation)
- George Crane (disambiguation)
- George Crawford (disambiguation)
- George Crawley (disambiguation)
- George Crenshaw (disambiguation)
- George Crichton (disambiguation)
- George Crile (disambiguation)
- George Critchett (disambiguation)
- George Crocker (disambiguation)
- George Croft (disambiguation)
- George Croghan (disambiguation)
- George Cross (disambiguation)
- George Crowe (disambiguation)
- George Crowther (disambiguation)
- George Cruickshank (disambiguation)
- George Crump (disambiguation)
- George Cuitt (disambiguation)
- George Cumming (disambiguation)
- George Cummings (disambiguation)
- George Cummins (disambiguation)
- George Cunningham (disambiguation)
- George Curme (disambiguation)
- George Currie (disambiguation)
- George Curry (disambiguation)
- George Curtis (disambiguation)
- George Curzon (disambiguation)
- George Cuthbertson (disambiguation)

===== D =====
- George Dale (disambiguation)
- George Daly (disambiguation)
- George Dallas (disambiguation)
- George Dalrymple (disambiguation)
- George Dance (disambiguation)
- George Danforth (disambiguation)
- George Daniel (disambiguation)
- George Daniell (disambiguation)
- George Daniels (disambiguation)
- George Darling (disambiguation)
- George Darrow (disambiguation)
- George Dashwood (disambiguation)
- George David (disambiguation)
- George Davidson (disambiguation)
- George Davie (disambiguation)
- George Davis (disambiguation)
- George Davison (disambiguation)
- George Dawson (disambiguation)
- George Day (disambiguation)
- George Deane (disambiguation)
- George Dempsey (disambiguation)
- George Dempster (disambiguation)
- George Denison (disambiguation)
- George Dennis (disambiguation)
- George Denny (disambiguation)
- George Denton (disambiguation)
- George E. de Silva (1879-1950), Sri Lankan politician
- George R. de Silva (1898–1968), Sri Lankan Sinhala politician
- George DeTitta (disambiguation)
- George Devereux (disambiguation)
- George Dewar (disambiguation)
- George Dewhurst (disambiguation)
- George Dick (disambiguation)
- George Dickerson (disambiguation)
- George Dickey (disambiguation)
- George Dickie (disambiguation)
- George Digby (disambiguation)
- George Dillon (disambiguation)
- George Dixon (disambiguation)
- George Dobson (disambiguation)
- George Dodd (disambiguation)
- George Dodington (disambiguation)
- George Dole (disambiguation)
- George Donaldson (disambiguation)
- George Donnelly (disambiguation)
- George Dorsey (disambiguation)
- George Douglas (disambiguation)
- George Dow (disambiguation)
- George Dowell (disambiguation)
- George Downing (disambiguation)
- George Draper (disambiguation)
- George Drew (disambiguation)
- George Druce (disambiguation)
- George Drummond (disambiguation)
- George Drury (disambiguation)
- George Duckett (disambiguation)
- George Duckworth (disambiguation)
- George Dudley (1894–1960), Canadian ice hockey administrator and Hockey Hall of Fame inductee
- George Duffield (disambiguation)
- George Duggan (disambiguation)
- George Dunbar (disambiguation)
- George Duncan (disambiguation)
- George Dundas (disambiguation)
- George Dunlap (disambiguation)
- George Dunlop (disambiguation)
- George Dunn (disambiguation)
- George Dutton (disambiguation)
- George Dyer (disambiguation)
- George Dyson (disambiguation)

===== E =====
- George Earl (disambiguation)
- George Earle (disambiguation)
- George Eastman (1854–1932), American entrepreneur, founder of the Eastman Kodak Company
- George Eastman (actor) (1942–2026), Italian actor and screenwriter
- George Eastman (cricketer) (1903–1991), English cricketer
- George Eaton (disambiguation)
- George Nicholas Eckert (1802–1865), U.S. congressman
- George Economou (disambiguation)
- George Eden (disambiguation)
- George Edgar (disambiguation)
- George Edgcumbe (disambiguation)
- George Edmonds (disambiguation)
- George Edmondson (disambiguation)
- George Edwards (disambiguation)
- George Elder (disambiguation)
- George Elliott (disambiguation)
- George Ellis (disambiguation)
- George Ellison (disambiguation)
- George Elmore (disambiguation)
- George Elmslie (disambiguation)
- George Emerson (disambiguation)
- George England (disambiguation)
- George English (disambiguation)
- George Epps (disambiguation)
- George Errington (disambiguation)
- George Eustis (disambiguation)
- George Evans (disambiguation)
- George Evelyn (disambiguation)
- George Ewing (disambiguation)

===== F =====
- George Fairbairn (disambiguation)
- George Fallon (disambiguation)
- George Fant (disambiguation)
- George Farmer (disambiguation)
- George Farrell (disambiguation)
- George Faulkner (disambiguation)
- George Featherstonhaugh (disambiguation)
- George Feeney (disambiguation)
- George Fenner (disambiguation)
- George Fenwick (disambiguation)
- George Ferguson (disambiguation)
- George Fergusson (disambiguation)
- George Fermor (disambiguation)
- George Ferris (disambiguation)
- George Field (disambiguation)
- George Finch (disambiguation)
- George Finch-Hatton (disambiguation)
- George Finlay (disambiguation)
- George Fischer (disambiguation)
- George Fisher (disambiguation)
- George Fitch (disambiguation)
- George FitzGerald (disambiguation)
- George FitzRoy (disambiguation)
- George Fitzsimmons (disambiguation)
- George Fleetwood (disambiguation)
- George Fleming (disambiguation)
- George Fletcher (disambiguation)
- George Flint (disambiguation)
- George Flowers (disambiguation)
- George Floyd (disambiguation)
- George Flynn (disambiguation)
- George Foley (disambiguation)
- George Forbes (disambiguation)
- George Ford (disambiguation)
- George Foreman (disambiguation)
- George Formby (1904–1961), British entertainer
- George Forrest (disambiguation)
- George Forrester (disambiguation)
- George Forster (disambiguation)
- George Forsyth (disambiguation)
- George Foss (disambiguation)
- George Foster (disambiguation)
- George Foulkes (disambiguation)
- George Fox (disambiguation)
- George Dario Franchitti (born 1973), Scottish racing driver
- George Francis (disambiguation)
- George Fraser (disambiguation)
- George Frazier (disambiguation)
- George Freaner (1831–1878), American politician from Maryland
- George Frederick (disambiguation)
- George Freeman (disambiguation)
- George French (disambiguation)
- George Frost (disambiguation)
- George Fuller (disambiguation)
- George Fullerton (disambiguation)
- George Fulton (disambiguation)

===== G =====
- George Gage (disambiguation)
- George Gaines (disambiguation)
- George Gale (disambiguation)
- George Galloway (disambiguation)
- George Gamble (disambiguation)
- George Gao (disambiguation)
- George Garden (disambiguation)
- George Gardiner (disambiguation)
- George Gardner (disambiguation)
- George Garland (disambiguation)
- George Garrett (disambiguation)
- George Gates (disambiguation)
- George Gauld (disambiguation)
- George Gauthier (disambiguation)
- George Geary (disambiguation)
- George Geddes (disambiguation)
- George Gee (disambiguation)
- George Germain (disambiguation)
- George Gewinner (1814–1894), German-born American bandmaster
- George Gibbs (disambiguation)
- George Gibson (disambiguation)
- George Gifford (disambiguation)
- George Gilbert (disambiguation)
- George Giles (disambiguation)
- George Gill (disambiguation)
- George Gillespie (disambiguation)
- George Gillett (disambiguation)
- George Gilman (disambiguation)
- George Gilmer (disambiguation)
- George Gilroy (disambiguation)
- George Gipp (1895–1920), American college football player
- George Gipps (disambiguation)
- George Glover (disambiguation)
- George Glyn (disambiguation)
- George Goddard (disambiguation)
- George Godfrey (disambiguation)
- George Godwin (disambiguation)
- George Gomori (disambiguation)
- George Gonzales (disambiguation)
- George Goodale (disambiguation)
- George Goodfellow (disambiguation)
- George Goodman (disambiguation)
- George Goodwin (disambiguation)
- George Gordon (disambiguation)
- George Gore (disambiguation)
- George Goring (disambiguation)
- George Goschen (disambiguation)
- George Gould (disambiguation)
- George Grabham (disambiguation)
- George Graff (disambiguation)
- George Graham (disambiguation)
- George Grainger (disambiguation)
- George Grant (disambiguation)
- George Grantham (disambiguation)
- George Graves (disambiguation)
- George Gray (disambiguation)
- George Greaves (disambiguation)
- George Green (disambiguation)
- George Greene (disambiguation)
- George Greenfield (disambiguation)
- George Gregory (disambiguation)
- George Grenville (disambiguation)
- George Greville (disambiguation)
- George Grey (disambiguation)
- George Grierson (disambiguation)
- George Griffin (disambiguation)
- George Griffith (disambiguation)
- George Griffiths (disambiguation)
- George Grimes (disambiguation)
- George Grinnell (disambiguation)
- George Gross (disambiguation)
- George Groves (disambiguation)
- George Gumbs Jr. (born 2002), American football player
- George Gund (disambiguation)
- George Gunn (disambiguation)
- George Guthrie (disambiguation)
- George Guy (disambiguation)

===== H =====
- George Haas (disambiguation)
- George Haddock (disambiguation)
- George Hadfield (disambiguation)
- George Hadley (disambiguation)
- George Hagan (disambiguation)
- George Hahn (disambiguation)
- George Halford (disambiguation)
- George Haliburton (disambiguation)
- George Hall (disambiguation)
- George Hallett (disambiguation)
- George Hamilton (disambiguation)
- George Hammond (disambiguation)
- George Hampel (disambiguation)
- George Hancock (disambiguation)
- George Hand (disambiguation)
- George Handford (disambiguation)
- George Handley (disambiguation)
- George Hanger (disambiguation)
- George Hanks (disambiguation)
- George Samuel Hanes (1882–1957), Canadian politician
- George Hanna (disambiguation)
- George Hannah (disambiguation)
- George Hansen (disambiguation)
- George Hardie (disambiguation)
- George Harding (disambiguation)
- George Hardy (disambiguation)
- George Hare (disambiguation)
- George Harker (disambiguation)
- George Harley (disambiguation)
- George Harlow (disambiguation)
- George Harmon (disambiguation)
- George Harney (disambiguation)
- George Harper (disambiguation)
- George Harris (disambiguation)
- George Harrison (disambiguation)
- George Hart (disambiguation)
- George Hartley (disambiguation)
- George Harvey (disambiguation)
- George Hassell (disambiguation)
- George Hastings (disambiguation)
- George Hawker (disambiguation)
- George Hawkes (disambiguation)
- George Hawkins (disambiguation)
- George Hay (disambiguation)
- George Hayduke (disambiguation)
- George Hayes (disambiguation)
- George Haynes (disambiguation)
- George Hays (disambiguation)
- George Hayward (disambiguation)
- George Hearn (disambiguation)
- George Heath (disambiguation)
- George Hebden (disambiguation)
- George Hecht (disambiguation)
- George Hedley (disambiguation)
- George Hellmuth (disambiguation)
- George Hemingway (disambiguation)
- George Henderson (disambiguation)
- George Heneage (disambiguation)
- George Henley (disambiguation)
- George Henry (disambiguation)
- George Hepburn (disambiguation)
- George Herbert (disambiguation)
- George Heriot (disambiguation)
- George Herman (disambiguation)
- George Heron (disambiguation)
- George Herron (disambiguation)
- George Herzog (1901–1983), American ethnomusicologist
- George Herzog (1851–1920), German-born, American interior designer
- George Hewitt (disambiguation)
- George Hibbard (disambiguation)
- George Hickes (disambiguation)
- George Hicks (disambiguation)
- George Higgins (disambiguation)
- George Hilditch (1803–1857), British artist
- George Hill (disambiguation)
- George Hilton (disambiguation)
- George Hinman (disambiguation)
- George Hirst (disambiguation)
- George Hitchcock (disambiguation)
- George Hoadley (disambiguation)
- George Hobart (disambiguation)
- George Hobart-Hampden (disambiguation)
- George Hobson (disambiguation)
- George Hodge (disambiguation)
- George Hodges (disambiguation)
- George Hodgson (disambiguation)
- George Hodson (disambiguation)
- George Hogan (disambiguation)
- George Hogg (disambiguation)
- George Holden (disambiguation)
- George Holland (disambiguation)
- George Holliday (disambiguation)
- George Hollis (disambiguation)
- George Holloway (disambiguation)
- George Holmes (disambiguation)
- George Holroyd (disambiguation)
- George Holt (disambiguation)
- George Home (disambiguation)
- George Hood (disambiguation)
- George Hooker (disambiguation)
- George Hooper (disambiguation)
- George Hope (disambiguation)
- George Hopkins (disambiguation)
- George Horne (disambiguation)
- George Horner (disambiguation)
- George Cecil Horry (1907–1981), British-born New Zealand tailor, confidence trickster and convicted murderer
- George Horsey (disambiguation)
- George Horton (disambiguation)
- George Hoskins (disambiguation)
- George Houghton (disambiguation)
- George House (disambiguation)
- George Houston (disambiguation)
- George Howard (disambiguation)
- George Howe (disambiguation)
- George Howell (disambiguation)
- George Howes (disambiguation)
- George Howson (disambiguation)
- George Huang (disambiguation)
- George Hudson (disambiguation)
- George Huff (disambiguation)
- George Hughes (disambiguation)
- George A. Hulett (1867–1955), American chemist
- George Hull (disambiguation)
- George Hume (disambiguation)
- George Humphrey (disambiguation)
- George Humphreys (disambiguation)
- George Hunt (disambiguation)
- George Hunter (disambiguation)
- George Huntington (disambiguation)
- George Hurst (disambiguation)
- George Hutchinson (disambiguation)
- George Hutchison (disambiguation)
- George Hyde (disambiguation)

===== I =====
- George Ingalls (disambiguation)
- George Inglis (disambiguation)
- George Innes (disambiguation)
- George Ireland (disambiguation)
- George Irvine (disambiguation)
- George Irving (disambiguation)
- George Irwin (disambiguation)
- George Ivanov (disambiguation)
- George Ives (disambiguation)
- George Ivory (disambiguation)

===== J =====
- George Jackson (disambiguation)
- George Jacobs (disambiguation)
- George James (disambiguation)
- George Jameson (disambiguation)
- George Jamieson (disambiguation)
- George Jarvis (disambiguation)
- George Jeffery (disambiguation)
- George Jeffreys (disambiguation)
- George Jenkins (disambiguation)
- George Jenks (disambiguation)
- George Jennings (disambiguation)
- George Jessel (disambiguation)
- George John (disambiguation)
- George Johnson (disambiguation)
- George Johnston (disambiguation)
- George Johnstone (disambiguation)
- George Jones (disambiguation)
- George Jordan (disambiguation)
- George Joseph (disambiguation)
- George Joy (disambiguation)
- George Julian (disambiguation)
- George Junkin (disambiguation)
- George Jupp (disambiguation)
- George Justice (disambiguation)

===== K =====
- George Kane (disambiguation)
- George Kay (disambiguation)
- George Keck (disambiguation)
- George Keith (disambiguation)
- George Kekewich (disambiguation)
- George Keller (disambiguation)
- George Kelley (disambiguation)
- George Kelly (disambiguation)
- George Kemp (disambiguation)
- George Kendall (disambiguation)
- George Kennedy (disambiguation)
- George Kenning (disambiguation)
- George Kent (disambiguation)
- George Keppel (disambiguation)
- George Kerr (disambiguation)
- George Keyt (1901–1993), Sri Lankan painter
- George Khoury (disambiguation)
- George Kidd (disambiguation)
- George Kiefer (disambiguation)
- George Kimball (disambiguation)
- George King (disambiguation)
- George Kinloch (disambiguation)
- George Kinnaird (disambiguation)
- George Kipp (disambiguation)
- George Kirby (disambiguation)
- George Kittredge (disambiguation)
- George Klassen (born 2002), American baseball player
- George Klein (disambiguation)
- George Knapp (disambiguation)
- George Knight (disambiguation)
- George Knox (disambiguation)
- George Alfred Kolkhorst
- George Kollias (disambiguation)
- George Kramer (disambiguation)
- George Krug (disambiguation)
- George Krull (1925–1957), American criminal
- George Kunkel (disambiguation)
- George Kynoch (disambiguation)

===== L =====
- George Ladd (disambiguation)
- George Lamb (disambiguation)
- George Lambert (disambiguation)
- George Landow (disambiguation)
- George Lane (disambiguation)
- George Lane-Fox (disambiguation)
- George Lang (disambiguation)
- George Langley (disambiguation)
- George Lascelles (disambiguation)
- George Latham (disambiguation)
- George Latimer (disambiguation)
- George Lauder (disambiguation)
- George Lawrence (disambiguation)
- George Lawson (disambiguation)
- George Lawton (disambiguation)
- George Lay (disambiguation)
- George Leach (disambiguation)
- George Leake (disambiguation)
- George Leary (disambiguation)
- George Leavitt (disambiguation)
- George Lee (disambiguation)
- George Leech (disambiguation)
- George Lees (disambiguation)
- George Lefevre (disambiguation)
- George Legge (disambiguation)
- George Leicester (disambiguation)
- George Leith (disambiguation)
- George Leland (disambiguation)
- George Lennox (disambiguation)
- George Leonard (disambiguation)
- George Leslie (disambiguation)
- George Lewis (disambiguation)
- George Lichtenstein (disambiguation)
- George Liddell (disambiguation)
- George Lilley (disambiguation)
- George Lindsay (disambiguation)
- George Linton (disambiguation)
- George Lisle (disambiguation)
- George Little (disambiguation)
- George Lloyd (disambiguation)
- George Locke, (1870–1937), Canadian librarian
- George Lockhart (disambiguation)
- George Lodge (disambiguation)
- George Logan (disambiguation)
- George London (disambiguation)
- George Long (disambiguation)
- George Longman (disambiguation)
- George Longstaff (disambiguation)
- George Lopez (disambiguation)
- George Horace Lorimer (1867–1937), American editor of The Saturday Evening Post
- George Louis (disambiguation)
- George Loveless (disambiguation)
- George Low (disambiguation)
- George Lowe (disambiguation)
- George Lowther (disambiguation)
- George Lucas (disambiguation)
- George Ludlow (disambiguation)
- George Luke (disambiguation)
- George Lundberg (disambiguation)
- George Lunn (disambiguation)
- George A. Luxford (1876–1956), associate justice of the Colorado Supreme Court
- George Lyall (disambiguation)
- George Lyle (disambiguation)
- George Lynch (disambiguation)
- George Lynn (disambiguation)
- George Lyon (disambiguation)
- George Lyons (disambiguation)
- George Lyttelton (disambiguation)

===== M =====
- George Macartney (disambiguation)
- George MacDonald (disambiguation)
- George Macfarlane (disambiguation)
- George Mackay (disambiguation)
- George Mackenzie (disambiguation)
- George Mackie (disambiguation)
- George MacLean (disambiguation)
- George Macpherson-Grant (disambiguation)
- George Mallen (born 1939), English computer arts businessman
- George Martin (1926–2016), English record producer known for being the Beatles' producer
- George McCallum (disambiguation)
- George McCarthy (disambiguation)
- George McClellan (disambiguation)
- George McCormick (disambiguation)
- George Deardorff McCreary (1846–1915), U.S. congressman
- George McFarland (disambiguation)
- George McGeachie (disambiguation)
- George McGhee (disambiguation)
- George McGill (disambiguation)
- George McGinnis (disambiguation)
- George McGowan (disambiguation)
- George McGrath (disambiguation)
- George McGuire (disambiguation)
- George McInerney (disambiguation)
- George McKee (disambiguation)
- George McKelvey (disambiguation)
- George McKenzie (disambiguation)
- George McLain (disambiguation)
- George McLaren (disambiguation)
- George McLean (disambiguation)
- George McLeod (disambiguation)
- George McMahon (disambiguation)
- George McManus (disambiguation)
- George McMillan (disambiguation)
- George McMurtry (disambiguation)
- George McNally (disambiguation)
- George McNaughton (disambiguation)
- George McNeil (disambiguation)
- George Meade (1815–1872), American Civil War general
- George Meldon (disambiguation)
- George Felix Michel Melki (born 1994), Swedish-Lebanese footballer
- George Melville (disambiguation)
- George Mercer (disambiguation)
- George Merrick (disambiguation)
- George Merrill (disambiguation)
- George Merritt (disambiguation)
- George Merry (disambiguation)
- George Metcalf (disambiguation)
- George Metesky (1903–1994), American bomber and terrorist
- George Meyer (disambiguation)
- George Michael (disambiguation)
- George Mickelson (disambiguation)
- George Middleton (disambiguation)
- George Miles (disambiguation)
- George Miley (disambiguation)
- George Millar (disambiguation)
- George Miller (disambiguation)
- George Milligan (disambiguation)
- George Mills (disambiguation)
- George Milne (disambiguation)
- George Milner (disambiguation)
- George Fort Milton (disambiguation)
- George Mitchell (disambiguation)
- George Moffat (disambiguation)
- George Mofokeng (disambiguation)
- George de Mohrenschildt, American geologist and CIA informant who knew Lee Harvey Oswald
- George Moloney (disambiguation)
- George Monckton-Arundell (disambiguation)
- George Monro (disambiguation)
- George Monson (disambiguation)
- George Montagu (disambiguation)
- George Montgomery (disambiguation)
- George Moore (disambiguation)
- George Moraes (disambiguation)
- George Moran (disambiguation)
- George Morell (disambiguation)
- George Morgan (disambiguation)
- George Morley (disambiguation)
- George Morrell (disambiguation)
- George Morris (disambiguation)
- George Morrison (disambiguation)
- George Morrow (disambiguation)
- George Morse (disambiguation)
- George Morton (disambiguation)
- George Moseley (disambiguation)
- George Moss (disambiguation)
- George Mountbatten (disambiguation)
- George Mountford (disambiguation)
- George Mudie (disambiguation)
- George Mueller (disambiguation)
- George Muir (disambiguation)
- George Muirhead (disambiguation)
- George Mulholland (disambiguation)
- George Mullin (disambiguation)
- George Munger (disambiguation)
- George Munro (disambiguation)
- George Munroe (disambiguation)
- George Murdoch (disambiguation)
- George Murphy (disambiguation)
- George Murray (disambiguation)
- George Musgrave (disambiguation)
- George Muthoot (disambiguation)
- George Myers (disambiguation)

===== N =====
- George Napier (disambiguation)
- George Nash (disambiguation)
- George Neal (disambiguation)
- George Needham (disambiguation)
- George Nelson (disambiguation)
- George Neville (disambiguation)
- George Newman (disambiguation)
- George Newton (disambiguation)
- George Nicholas (disambiguation)
- George Nicholls (disambiguation)
- George Nichols (disambiguation)
- George Nicholson (disambiguation)
- George Nicol (disambiguation)
- George Nixon (disambiguation)
- George Noble (disambiguation)
- George Noonan (disambiguation)
- George Norman (disambiguation)
- George Norris (disambiguation)
- George North (disambiguation)
- George Northey (disambiguation)
- George Noyes (disambiguation)
- George Nugent (disambiguation)
- George Nurse (disambiguation)
- George Nye (disambiguation)

===== O =====
- George Oakes (disambiguation)
- George O'Brien (disambiguation)
- George O'Connor (disambiguation)
- George Odom (disambiguation)
- George Ogilvy (disambiguation)
- George O'Hara (disambiguation)
- George Oldenburg (disambiguation)
- George Oldfield (disambiguation)
- George Oldham (disambiguation)
- George Oliver (disambiguation)
- George Olmsted (disambiguation)
- George O'Neill (disambiguation)
- George Onslow (disambiguation)
- George Ormsby (disambiguation)
- George Orr (disambiguation)
- George Osborn (disambiguation)
- George Osborne (disambiguation)
- George Owen (disambiguation)
- George Owens (disambiguation)
- George Oxenden (disambiguation)

===== P =====
- George Pack (disambiguation)
- George Page (disambiguation)
- George Paget (disambiguation)
- George Paice (disambiguation)
- George Paine (disambiguation)
- George Emil Palade (1912–2008), Romanian-American cell biologist
- George Palmer (disambiguation)
- George Parker (disambiguation)
- George Parkin (disambiguation)
- George Parkinson (disambiguation)
- George Parks (disambiguation)
- George Parr (disambiguation)
- George Parry (disambiguation)
- George Parsons (disambiguation)
- George Passmore (disambiguation)
- George Paterson (disambiguation)
- George Paton (disambiguation)
- George Patterson (disambiguation)
- George Patton (disambiguation)
- George Paul (disambiguation)
- George Paulet (disambiguation)
- George Payne (disambiguation)
- George Paynter (disambiguation)
- George Peabody (disambiguation)
- George Peacock (disambiguation)
- George Peake (disambiguation)
- George Pearce (disambiguation)
- George Pearson (disambiguation)
- George Pease (disambiguation)
- George Peck (disambiguation)
- George Pedersen (disambiguation)
- George Pegram (disambiguation)
- George Peirce (disambiguation)
- George Pelham (disambiguation)
- George Pendleton (disambiguation)
- George Pennant (disambiguation)
- George Pennington (disambiguation)
- George Pepper (disambiguation)
- George Percy (disambiguation)
- George Perkins (disambiguation)
- George Perley (disambiguation)
- George Perpich (disambiguation)
- George Perry (disambiguation)
- George Peter (disambiguation)
- George Peters (disambiguation)
- George Petrie (disambiguation)
- George Philip (disambiguation)
- George Philips (disambiguation)
- George Phillips (disambiguation)
- George Pickering (disambiguation)
- George W. Pickle (1845–1912), Tennessee Attorney General
- George Pierce (disambiguation)
- George Pilkington (disambiguation)
- George Pillsbury (disambiguation)
- George Pimentel (disambiguation)
- George Pinto (disambiguation)
- George Piper (disambiguation)
- George Pirie (disambiguation)
- George Piștereanu (born 1990), Romanian actor
- George Pitcher (disambiguation)
- George Pitt (disambiguation)
- George Pitts (disambiguation)
- George Plantagenet (disambiguation)
- George Platt (disambiguation)
- George Plunkett (disambiguation)
- George Pollard (disambiguation)
- George Pollock (disambiguation)
- George Poole (disambiguation)
- George Pope (disambiguation)
- George Porter (disambiguation)
- George Post (disambiguation)
- George Potter (disambiguation)
- George Powell (disambiguation)
- George Power (disambiguation)
- George Pratt (disambiguation)
- George Preston (disambiguation)
- George Price (disambiguation)
- George Primrose (disambiguation)
- George Prince (disambiguation)
- George Pritchard (disambiguation)
- George Proctor (disambiguation)
- George Prosser (disambiguation)
- George Prynne (disambiguation)
- George Pugh (disambiguation)
- George Pullen (disambiguation)
- George Pușcaș (born 1996), Romanian footballer
- George Putnam (disambiguation)
- George Pyke (disambiguation)
- George Pyne (disambiguation)
- George Pyper (disambiguation)

===== Q =====
- George Quentin (disambiguation)
- George Quigley (disambiguation)

===== R =====
- George Radcliffe (disambiguation)
- George Rae (disambiguation)
- George Ragan (born 1981), better known by his stage name "Johnny 3 Tears", American musician
- George Rainsford (disambiguation)
- George Rajapaksa (1926–1976), Sri Lankan Sinhala politician
- G. W. Rajapaksha (1917–1999), Sri Lankan military officer and educationist
- G. C. Rambukpotha (1884–1943), Sri Lankan Sinhala lawyer and politician
- George Ramsay (disambiguation)
- George Randall (disambiguation)
- George Ranken (disambiguation)
- George Ratcliffe (disambiguation)
- George Ray (disambiguation)
- George Raynor (disambiguation)
- George Read (disambiguation)
- George Reade (disambiguation)
- George Reed (disambiguation)
- George Reid (disambiguation)
- George Rendel (disambiguation)
- George Rennie (disambiguation)
- George Renny (disambiguation)
- George Renwick (disambiguation)
- George Revercomb (disambiguation)
- George Rex (disambiguation)
- George Rexstrew (born 1994), English actor
- George Reynolds (disambiguation)
- George Rhodes (disambiguation)
- George Rice (disambiguation)
- George Richards (disambiguation)
- George Richardson (disambiguation)
- George Richmond (disambiguation)
- George Rickards (disambiguation)
- George Ricketts (disambiguation)
- George Riddell (disambiguation)
- George Ridley (disambiguation)
- George Riley (disambiguation)
- George Ripley (disambiguation)
- George Ritchie (disambiguation)
- George Rix (disambiguation)
- George Robb (disambiguation)
- George Robbins (disambiguation)
- George Roberts (disambiguation)
- George Robertson (disambiguation)
- George Robinson (disambiguation)
- George Robson (disambiguation)
- George Roche (disambiguation)
- George Rochfort (disambiguation)
- George Rockwell (disambiguation)
- George Rodgers (disambiguation)
- George Rodney (disambiguation)
- George Rogers (disambiguation)
- George Romney (disambiguation)
- George Roosevelt (disambiguation)
- George Rose (disambiguation)
- George Ross (disambiguation)
- George Rowe (disambiguation)
- George Rowell (disambiguation)
- George Rowley (disambiguation)
- George Rudd (disambiguation)
- George Russell (disambiguation)
- George Rust (disambiguation)
- Babe Ruth (1895–1948), American baseball player
- George Ryan (disambiguation)
- George Ryland (disambiguation)

===== S =====
- George Sage (disambiguation)
- George Salisbury (disambiguation)
- George Sampson (disambiguation)
- George Sanders (disambiguation)
- George Sanderson (disambiguation)
- George Sanford (disambiguation)
- George Sanger (disambiguation)
- George Santos (disambiguation)
- George Sargent (disambiguation)
- George Saunders (disambiguation)
- George Savage (disambiguation)
- George Savile (disambiguation)
- George Sawyer (disambiguation)
- George Sayer (disambiguation)
- George Scarborough (disambiguation)
- George Schaefer (disambiguation)
- George Schneider (disambiguation)
- George Schuster (disambiguation)
- George Scott (disambiguation)
- George Scrimshaw (disambiguation)
- George Seddon (disambiguation)
- George Seeley (disambiguation)
- George Seitz (disambiguation)
- George Selden (disambiguation)
- George Selwyn (disambiguation)
- George Seney (disambiguation)
- George Seton (disambiguation)
- George Seward (disambiguation)
- George Sewell (disambiguation)
- George Seymour (disambiguation)
- George Shannon (disambiguation)
- George Sharpe (disambiguation)
- George Sharswood (1810–1883), American politician and judge
- George Shaw (disambiguation)
- George Shea (disambiguation)
- George Shedden (disambiguation)
- George Shee (disambiguation)
- George Sheehan (disambiguation)
- George Sheldon (disambiguation)
- George Shell (disambiguation)
- George Shelley (disambiguation)
- George Shelton (disambiguation)
- George Shepherd (disambiguation)
- George Shepley (disambiguation)
- George Sheridan (disambiguation)
- George Sherman (disambiguation)
- George Sherwood (disambiguation)
- George Shields (disambiguation)
- George Shipley (disambiguation)
- George Shiras (disambiguation)
- George Sibley (disambiguation)
- George Simion (born 1986), Romanian activist and politician
- George Simmons (disambiguation)
- George Simon (disambiguation)
- George Simonds (disambiguation)
- George Simpson (disambiguation)
- George Sims (disambiguation)
- George Sinclair (disambiguation)
- George Sisler (disambiguation)
- George Skelton (disambiguation)
- George Skene (disambiguation)
- George Skinner (disambiguation)
- George Small (disambiguation)
- George Smallcombe (disambiguation)
- George Smart (disambiguation)
- George Smeaton (disambiguation)
- George Smith (disambiguation)
- George Smyth (disambiguation)
- George Smythe (disambiguation)
- George Snell (disambiguation)
- George Snow (disambiguation)
- George Snyder (disambiguation)
- George Somers (disambiguation)
- George Soule (disambiguation)
- George South (disambiguation)
- George Southcote (disambiguation)
- George Southwick (disambiguation)
- George Souza (disambiguation)
- George Brettingham Sowerby (disambiguation)
- George Sparkman (disambiguation)
- George Speke (disambiguation)
- George Spence (disambiguation)
- George Spencer (disambiguation)
- George Spero (disambiguation)
- George Spratt (disambiguation)
- George Spriggs (disambiguation)
- George Squibb (disambiguation)
- George Stacey (disambiguation)
- George Stafford (disambiguation)
- George Stallings (disambiguation)
- George Stanich (born 1928), American high jumper
- George Stanley (disambiguation)
- George Staples (disambiguation)
- George Starr (disambiguation)
- George Staunton (disambiguation)
- George Stearns (disambiguation)
- George Steel (disambiguation)
- George Steele (disambiguation)
- George Stephen (disambiguation)
- George Stephens (disambiguation)
- George Stephenson (disambiguation)
- George Sternberg (disambiguation)
- George Steuart (disambiguation)
- George Stevens (disambiguation)
- George Stevenson (disambiguation)
- George Stewart (disambiguation)
- George Stiles (disambiguation)
- George Stirling (disambiguation)
- George Stobbart (disambiguation)
- George Stocking (disambiguation)
- George Stokes (disambiguation)
- George Stone (disambiguation)
- George Stoney (disambiguation)
- George Story (disambiguation)
- George Stott (disambiguation)
- George Strahan (disambiguation)
- George Strait (born 1952), American country music singer
- George Stratton (disambiguation)
- George Street (disambiguation)
- George Strickland (disambiguation)
- George Strong (disambiguation)
- George Strutt (disambiguation)
- George Stuart (disambiguation)
- George Styles (disambiguation)
- George Sullivan (disambiguation)
- George Summers (disambiguation)
- George Sumner (disambiguation)
- George Susce (disambiguation)
- George Sutherland (disambiguation)
- George Sutherland-Leveson-Gower (disambiguation)
- George Sutton (disambiguation)
- George Swain (disambiguation)
- George Swan (disambiguation)
- George Sweeney (disambiguation)
- George Sweetser (disambiguation)
- George Swift (disambiguation)
- George Sykes (disambiguation)
- George Symes (disambiguation)
- George Symons (disambiguation)

===== T =====
- George Talbot (disambiguation)
- George Tallas (1944–2023), American racing driver
- George Tanner (disambiguation)
- George Tate (disambiguation)
- George Taylor (disambiguation)
- George Tebbetts (disambiguation)
- George Temple (disambiguation)
- George Terry (disambiguation)
- George K. Teulon (1812–1846), English–Texian journalist and freemason
- George Thackeray (disambiguation)
- George Thayer (disambiguation)
- George Thomas (disambiguation)
- George Thomason (disambiguation)
- George Thompson (disambiguation)
- George Thomson (disambiguation)
- George Thorn (disambiguation)
- George Thorne (disambiguation)
- George Thornton (disambiguation)
- George Thorpe (disambiguation)
- George Threlfall (disambiguation)
- George Throop (disambiguation)
- George Tibbits (disambiguation)
- George Tichenor (disambiguation)
- George Ticknor (disambiguation)
- George Timotheou (born 1997), Australian footballer
- George Tobin (disambiguation)
- George Tod (disambiguation)
- George Todd (disambiguation)
- George Tomline (disambiguation)
- George Tomlinson (disambiguation)
- George Toone (disambiguation)
- George Torrance (disambiguation)
- George Torrey (disambiguation)
- George Totten (disambiguation)
- George Towns (disambiguation)
- George Townsend (disambiguation)
- George Townshend (disambiguation)
- George Tranter (disambiguation)
- George Trapp (disambiguation)
- George Treby (disambiguation)
- George Trenchard (disambiguation)
- George Troup (disambiguation)
- George Truman (disambiguation)
- George Tuchet (disambiguation)
- George Tuck (disambiguation)
- George Tucker (disambiguation)
- George Tuckett (disambiguation)
- George Tully (disambiguation)
- George Tupou (disambiguation)
- George Turnbull (disambiguation)
- George Turner (disambiguation)
- George Tyler (disambiguation)
- George Tyson (disambiguation)

===== U =====
- George Ulrich (disambiguation)
- George Underwood (disambiguation)
- George Upham (disambiguation)
- George Upshur (disambiguation)
- George Upton (disambiguation)

===== V =====
- George Vaillant (disambiguation)
- George Valentine (disambiguation)
- George Washington Vanderbilt III (1914–1961), American yachtsman and scientific explorer
- George Vasey (disambiguation)
- George Vaughan (disambiguation)
- George Vaughn (disambiguation)
- George Venables-Vernon (disambiguation)
- George Verity (disambiguation)
- George Vernon (disambiguation)
- George Vest (disambiguation)
- George Villiers (disambiguation)
- George Vincent (disambiguation)
- George Vivian (disambiguation)

===== W =====
- George Waddell (disambiguation)
- George Wade (disambiguation)
- George Wadsworth (disambiguation)
- George Wagner (disambiguation)
- George Wagoner (disambiguation)
- George Waldegrave (disambiguation)
- George Wales (disambiguation)
- George Walker (disambiguation)
- George Wallace (disambiguation)
- George Waller (disambiguation)
- George Wallis (disambiguation)
- George Walsh (disambiguation)
- George Walter (disambiguation)
- George Walters (disambiguation)
- George Walther (disambiguation)
- George Walton (disambiguation)
- George Wang (disambiguation)
- George Warburton (disambiguation)
- George Ward (disambiguation)
- George Waring (disambiguation)
- George Warner (disambiguation)
- George Warren (disambiguation)
- George Washburn (disambiguation)
- George Washington (name)
  - George Washington (1732–1799), 1st president of the United States (1789–97)
- George Waterhouse (disambiguation)
- George Waters (disambiguation)
- George Wathen (disambiguation)
- George Watkins (disambiguation)
- George Watson (disambiguation)
- George Watt (disambiguation)
- George Washington Watts (1851–1921), American businessman and philanthropist
- George Watters (disambiguation)
- George Watts (disambiguation)
- George Weatherill (disambiguation)
- George Weaver (disambiguation)
- George Webb (disambiguation)
- George Webbe (disambiguation)
- George Webber (disambiguation)
- George Weber (disambiguation)
- George Webster (disambiguation)
- George Weed (disambiguation)
- George Weeks (disambiguation)
- George Weidler (disambiguation)
- George Weinberg (disambiguation)
- George Weir (disambiguation)
- George Weiss (disambiguation)
- George Welch (disambiguation)
- George Weldon (disambiguation)
- George Weller (disambiguation)
- George Wells (disambiguation)
- George Welsh (disambiguation)
- George Wendt (1948–2025), American actor
- George Wentworth (disambiguation)
- George West (disambiguation)
- George Weston (disambiguation)
- George Wetmore (disambiguation)
- George Weymouth (1585–1612), English explorer
- George Whaley (disambiguation)
- George Wharton (disambiguation)
- George Wheeler (disambiguation)
- George Whelan (disambiguation)
- George Wheler (disambiguation)
- George Whipple (disambiguation)
- George Whitaker (disambiguation)
- George Whitby (disambiguation)
- George White (disambiguation)
- George Whitehead (disambiguation)
- George Whitmore (disambiguation)
- George Whitney (disambiguation)
- George Whittaker (disambiguation)
- George Whitworth (disambiguation)
- George Wickens (disambiguation)
- George Widener (disambiguation)
- George Wilbur (disambiguation)
- George Wilcox (disambiguation)
- George Wilde (disambiguation)
- George Wilder (disambiguation)
- George Wilkins (disambiguation)
- George Wilkinson (disambiguation)
- George Alfred Henry Wille (1871–1951), Sri Lankan journalist and politician
- George William (disambiguation)
- George Williams (disambiguation)
- George Williamson (disambiguation)
- George Willis (disambiguation)
- George Willoughby (disambiguation)
- George Wills (disambiguation)
- George Wilson (disambiguation)
- George Windsor-Clive (disambiguation)
- George Winston (disambiguation)
- George Winter (disambiguation)
- George Wise (disambiguation)
- George Wishart (disambiguation)
- George Withers (disambiguation)
- George Witt (disambiguation)
- George Wolfe (disambiguation)
- George Wolff (disambiguation)
- George Wombwell (disambiguation)
- George Wood (disambiguation)
- George Woodbridge (disambiguation)
- George Woods (disambiguation)
- George Woodward (disambiguation)
- George Worthington (disambiguation)
- George Wright (disambiguation)
- George Wyatt (disambiguation)
- George Wylie (disambiguation)
- George Wyndham (disambiguation)

===== Y =====
- George Yates (disambiguation)
- George Young (disambiguation)
- George Yule (disambiguation)

===== Z =====
- George Zidek (born 1973), Czech basketball player
- George Ziegler (disambiguation)
- George Ziemann (disambiguation)
- George Zimmerman (disambiguation)

== Pen or stage name ==
- George Alice, Australian singer-songwriter Georgia Mannion (born 2003)
- George Eastman (actor), Italian B-movie actor and screenwriter Luigi Montefiori (born 1942)
- George Eliot, pen name of English writer Mary Ann Evans (1819–1880)
- George Orwell pen name of English writer Eric Arthur Blair (1903–1950)

== Fictional characters ==
- Big George, a character in the 1991 American comedy-drama Fried Green Tomatoes
- Curious George, monkey who is the title character in the Curious George franchise
- King George, a character in the animated film Hoppers
- George Bailey, the main character in the 1946 American Christmas supernatural drama movie It's a Wonderful Life
- George Beard, character from Captain Underpants
- George Cooper Sr. and George "Georgie" Cooper Jr, both characters in Young Sheldon
- George Costanza, a character in the television series Seinfeld
- George Hanson, a main character in The Object of My Affection
- George Jetson, a character in the animated television series The Jetsons
- George Weasley, one of the Weasley twins in the Harry Potter series
- George McFly, a character in the Back To The Future movie series
- George Owens, a character from Mr. Belvedere
- George Papadopoulos and George "Papa" Papadopoulos, Sr, characters in the American sitcom television series Webster
- George P. Mandrake (formerly known as Barnyard Dawg), a character from the Looney Tunes franchise
- George Roper, one of the two main characters in the British sitcom George and Mildred
- George Stoody, one of the two main characters in the American sitcom television series George and Leo
- George Taylor, the main character in the American film Planet of the Apes
- George Pig, a 2-year-old pig and Peppa's younger brother in the British show Peppa Pig
- George Kirrin, a character from The Famous Five
- George Liquor, a character created by John Kricfalusi
- George Lundgren, a character in the Arthur book and television series
- George the Steamroller, a character from Thomas & Friends
- The title character of the animated television program George of the Jungle
- The title character of the American animated television series George Shrinks
- The title character of the TV series George Lopez
- George, a giant gorilla in video game Rampage

== See also ==
- Georg (disambiguation)
- George (disambiguation)
- George (surname)
- Georgeanna
- Georgeson
- Georgiev
- Georgievski
- Georgios
- Giorgos
- Saint George (disambiguation)
- Georgia (disambiguation)
- Geordie
