= George Fenwick =

George Fenwick or Fenwicke may refer to:

- Sir George Fenwick (editor) (1847–1929), New Zealand newspaper proprietor and editor
- George Fenwick (Parliamentarian) (1603–1657), founder of Saybrook Colony in Connecticut
- George Fenwicke (1690–1760), English clergyman and religious writer
