= George Goodale =

George Goodale may refer to:

- George Lincoln Goodale (1839–1923), American botanist
- George P. Goodale (1843–1919), American theatre critic
