= George Hartley =

George Hartley may refer to:

- George Hartley (cricketer, born 1909) (1909–1992), English cricketer
- George Hartley (cricketer, born 1849) (1849–1909), English cricketer
- George Hartley, lynched in Tennessee, 1922
