= Zeus Georgos =

Form of Zeus venerated in Ancient Athens

Zeus Georgos (Ζεύς Γεωργός, i.e. Zeus "the husbandman" or "the tiller") was a form of Zeus venerated in Ancient Athens. He was a god of farmland and of crops, and his festival was on the 10th day of Maimakterion, at the time of plowing and sowing. There were also sacrifices to Zeus Georgos at harvest (the Greek Thalysia, also known as Pankarpia).

The given name Georgios is in origin a theophoric name relating to Zeus Georgos.
