= George Sheridan =

George Sheridan may refer to:

- George Sheridan (footballer) (1929–1986), English footballer
- George A. Sheridan (1840–1896), American politician
