= George Pimentel =

George Pimentel may refer to

- George C. Pimentel, chemist
- George Pimentel (photographer), Canadian photographer
