= George Grantham =

George Grantham may refer to:

- George Grantham (baseball) (1900–1954)
- George Grantham (musician) (born 1947)
- George Grantham (economic historian) (born 1941)
