= George Tichenor =

George Tichenor may refer to:

- George H. Tichenor (1837–1923), Kentucky-born physician
- George C. Tichenor (1838–1902), Member of the Board of General Appraisers
