= George Roche =

George Roche may refer to:

- George Roche III (1935–2006), president of Hillsdale College, 1971–1999
- George Roche (English footballer) (1889–1973), English footballer
- George Roche (Gaelic footballer), Irish Gaelic footballer
