= George Rex (disambiguation) =

George Rex may refer to:

- George Rex (1765–1839), British-born entrepreneur and founder of Knysna
- George Rex (politician) (1817–1879), Democratic politician in Wooster, Ohio

== See also ==
- George Rex Graham (1813–1894), Philadelphia journalist and publishing entrepreneur
- King George (disambiguation)
