= George Stafford =

George Stafford may refer to:

- George Stafford (musician), American jazz drummer
- George Stafford (rugby league), rugby league footballer of the 1920s and 1930s
- George Stafford (footballer) (1930–2010), Australian rules footballer
- George M. Stafford (1915–1995), chairman of the Interstate Commerce Commission
