= George Hawker =

George Hawker may refer to:

- George Charles Hawker (1818–1895), South Australian settler and politician
- George Stanley Hawker (1894–1979), South Australian politician
