= George Clancy =

George Clancy may refer to:

- George Clancy (politician) (1881–1921), Irish nationalist politician and mayor of Limerick
- George Clancy (rugby union) (born 1977), Irish rugby union referee

== See also ==
- George Clancey (1881–1921), American actor
