= George Liddell =

George Liddell may refer to:

- George Liddell (footballer)
- George Liddell (cricketer)
- George Liddell (MP)
