= George Darling =

George Darling may refer to:

- George Darling (politician) (1905–1985), British politician
- George Darling (physician) (1782?–1862), Scottish physician
- George Darling (sport shooter) (born 1950), British sports shooter
- George Darling (Peter Pan), character
