= George Kinloch =

George Kinloch may refer to:

- George Kinloch (politician) (1775–1833), Scottish reformer and politician
- George Ritchie Kinloch (1796–1877), Scottish lawyer, antiquarian and ballad collector
