= George Cisar =

George Cisar may refer to:

- George Cisar (baseball) (1910–2010), MLB player for the Brooklyn Dodgers
- George Cisar (actor) (1912–1979), character actor
