= George Cheyne =

George Cheyne may refer to:

- George Cheyne (physician) (1671–1743), British physician and medical writer
- George Cheyne (settler) (1790–1869), early settler in Western Australia
