= George Ziegler =

George Ziegler may refer to:

- George Ziegler (baseball) (1872–1916), Major League baseball player
- George Ziegler (general) (1832–1912), Union general during the American Civil War
- Fred Goetz (1897–1934), used George Ziegler as an alternate name
