= George Pelham =

George Pelham may refer to:

- George Pelham (bishop) (1766–1827), English bishop
- George F. Pelham (1857–1937), American architect
- George Pelham (1873–1939), Titanic survivor
