= George Case =

George Case may refer to:

- George Case (slave trader) (1747–1836)
- George Case (cricketer) (1839–1911)
- George Case (baseball) (1915–1989)
- George B. Case, co-founder of law firm White & Case
