= George Feeney =

George Feeney may refer to:

- George Feeney (boxer) (born 1957), English boxer
- George Feeney (politician) (fl. 1968-present), American politician
- George Feeney (footballer) (born 2008), Welsh footballer

== See also ==
- George Feeny, fictional character in American sitcom Boy Meets World
