= George Hogan =

George Hogan may refer to:

- George Hogan (baseball) (1885–1922)
- George Hogan (basketball) (1915–1965)
