= George Orr =

George Orr may refer to:

- George E. Ohr (1857–1918), American ceramic artist
- George Orr (cricketer) (1896–1972), Australian-born New Zealand cricketer
- George Orr, protagonist of the novel The Lathe of Heaven
