= George Dance =

George Dance may refer to:

- George Dance the Elder (1695–1768), English architect
- George Dance the Younger (1741–1825), English architect, son of George Dance the Elder
- George Dance (politician), Canadian politician
- Sir George Dance (dramatist) (1857–1932), English lyricist and librettist
