= George Vivian =

George Vivian may refer to:

- George Vivian (artist) (1798–1873), English traveller and topographical artist
- George Vivian, 4th Baron Vivian (1878–1940), British soldier
- George Vivian (sport shooter) (1872–1936), Canadian shooter
