= George Curzon =

George Curzon may refer to:

- George Curzon-Howe, 2nd Earl Howe (1821–1876), British peer
- George Curzon, 1st Marquess Curzon of Kedleston (1859–1925), Viceroy of India and British Foreign Secretary
- George Curzon (actor) (1898–1976)
