= George Gauld =

George Gauld may refer to:

- George Gauld (aviator) (died 1964), Canadian World War I flying ace
- George Gauld (surveyor) (1731–1782), British military engineer, cartographer and surveyor
- George Gauld (cricketer) (1873–1950), English cricketer
