= George Kipp =

George Kipp may refer to:

- George Washington Kipp, member of the U.S. House of Representatives from Pennsylvania
- George Kipp III, member of the Montana House of Representatives
