= George Fort Milton =

George Fort Milton may refer to:

- George Fort Milton Sr. (1869–1924), American newspaperman and social reformer
- George Fort Milton Jr. (1894–1955), American newspaperman and historian
