= George Devereux (disambiguation) =

George Devereux was a French-American ethnologist and psychoanalyst.

George Devereux may also refer to:

- George Devereux (MP for Montgomery) (fl. 1647–1653), Member of Parliament (MP) for Montgomery
- George Devereux (MP for Pembrokeshire), see Pembrokeshire, 1589
- George Devereux, 13th Viscount Hereford (1744–1804), British peer
