= George Alderink =

American businessman and politician (1889–1977)

George Alderink (May 9, 1889 – August 5, 1977) was an American businessman and politician.

Alderink was born in Michigan. He went to Holland Business College and to Northland College. Alderink lived in Pease, Mille Lacs County, Minnesota with his wife and family and was a merchant. Alderink serves as the mayor of Pease, as the Peace village treasurer, and the Pease postmaster. He also served on the Pease Village Council and on the Pease School Board. Alderink served in the Minnesota House of Representatives from 1955 to 1958.
