= George Shepley =

George Shepley may refer to:

- George Foster Shepley (judge) (1819–1878), American Civil War general
- George Foster Shepley (architect) (1860–1903), American architect
- George L. Shepley (1854–1924), lieutenant governor of Rhode Island
