= George Gao =

George Gao may refer to:

- George F. Gao (born 1961), Chinese microbiologist
- George Gao (erhu) (born 1967), Chinese erhu player

== See also ==
- George Kao (1912–2008), Chinese American author, translator, and journalist
