= George Oldfield =

George Oldfield may refer to:

- George Oldfield (police officer) (1923–1985), British police detective
- George S. Oldfield, academic in the field of finance
