= George Thayer =

George Thayer may refer to:

- George Thayer (football player), American football player and businessman (1905–1952)
- George Thayer (writer), American political writer (1933–1973)
