= George Pendleton =

George Pendleton may refer to:

- George C. Pendleton (1845–1913), U.S. Representative from Texas
- George H. Pendleton (1825–1889), U.S. Representative and Senator from Ohio
