= George Scarborough =

George Scarborough may refer to:

- George Scarborough (writer), 20th century lawyer, playwright, and author
- George Scarborough (cowboy), 19th century cowboy and lawman

== See also ==
- George Scarbrough, poet who wrote about Appalachia
