= George Lichtenstein =

George Lichtenstein may refer to:

- George Lichty (George Maurice Lichtenstein, 1905–1982), American cartoonist
- George Lichtenstein (musician) (1823–1893), Hungarian pianist and music teacher
