= George Gaines =

George Gaines may refer to:

- George Strother Gaines (1784–1873), American leader in the Mississippi Territory
- George Gaines (set decorator) (1933–1986), American set decorator
- George Gaynes (1917–2016), Finnish-born American actor
