= George Joy =

George Joy may refer to:

- George W. Joy (1844–1925), Irish painter
- George Joy (colonial administrator) (1896–1974), British colonial administrator
- George Joye (c. 1495–1553), also Joy, Bible translator
