= George Dyson =

George Dyson may refer to:

- George Dyson (composer) (1883–1964), English composer
- George Dyson (science historian) (born 1953), writer on science
