= George Brent (disambiguation) =

George Brent (1904–1979) was an Irish-American stage, film, and television actor. George Brent may also refer to:

- George Brent (politician) (died c. 1699), the colonial Virginia planter, lawyer, and politician
- George William Brent (1821–1872), Virginia lawyer, Confederate and politician
- George Brent (judge) (1817–1881), justice of the Maryland Court of Appeals

== See also ==
- George Brett (born 1953), baseball player
