= George Gamble =

George Gamble may refer to:

- George Gamble (cricketer) (1877–1949), English cricketer
- George Gamble (racing driver) (born 1996), British racing driver
