= George Monson =

George Monson may refer to:

- George Monson (died 1739) (c. 1693–1739), British lawyer and politician
- George Monson (born 1657/8), younger brother of the 3rd and 4th Monson baronets (of Carleton), father of the 1st Baron Monson
- George Monson (1730–1776), brigadier-general in the British Army, third son of the 1st Baron Monson, commander of the 50th (Queen's Own) Regiment of Foot
- George Monson (cricketer) (1755–1823), cricketer, second son of the 2nd Baron Monson
