= George Ivory =

George Ivory may refer to:

- George Ivory (footballer) (1910–1992), English professional footballer
- George Ivory (basketball) (born 1965), American basketball coach
