= George Rockwell =

George Rockwell may refer to:

- George Lincoln Rockwell (1918–1967), American neo-Nazi and founder of the American Nazi Party
- George Lovejoy Rockwell (1889–1978), American vaudeville performer and radio personality
