= George Conn =

George Conn may refer to:

- George Conn (soccer), American soccer player
- George Conn (priest) (died 1640), Scottish Roman Catholic priest and papal diplomat
