= George Sanford =

George Sanford may refer to:

- George Sanford (American football) (1870–1938), American football player and coach, College Football Hall of Fame inductee
- George Sanford (assemblyman), member of the 64th New York State Legislature
- George Sanford (political scientist), British academic specializing in Polish and East European Studies
- George H. Sanford (1836–1871), New York politician
