= George Pegram =

George Pegram may refer to:

- George B. Pegram (George Braxton Pegram, 1876–1958), physicist involved in the Manhattan Project
- George H. Pegram (1855–1937), engineer who patented Pegram Truss for bridges
