= George McGeachie =

George McGeachie may refer to:

- George McGeachie (footballer, born 1918) (1918–1972), Scottish football defender for Crystal Palace and Rochdale
- George McGeachie (footballer, born 1939), Scottish football left winger for Dundee and Darlington
- George McGeachie (footballer, born 1959), Scottish football defender for Dundee
