= George Foulkes =

George Foulkes may refer to:

- George Ernest Foulkes (1878–1960), United States Representative from Michigan
- George Foulkes, Baron Foulkes of Cumnock (born 1942), Scottish politician
