= George Seddon =

George Seddon may refer to:

- George Seddon (academic) (1927–2007), Australian scientist
- George Seddon (cabinetmaker) (1727–1801), English cabinetmaker

== See also ==
- George Sneddon (born 1949), Scottish international lawn and indoor bowls player
