= George Landow =

George Landow is the name of:

- George Landow (professor) (1940–2023), British critic and theorist of hypermedia
- George Landow (filmmaker) (1944–2011), American painter, writer, photographer, and filmmaker
