= George Lisle =

George Lisle may refer to:

- George Lisle (Royalist) (c. 1610–1648), Royalist leader in the English Civil War
- George Lisle (Baptist) (1750–1820), emancipated American slave, missionary and pastor
