= George Sheridan (footballer) =

English footballer

Personal information
- Full name: George Francis Sheridan
- Date of birth: 30 October 1929
- Place of birth: Wigan, England
- Date of death: 21 December 1986 (aged 57)
- Place of death: Salford, England
- Position: Outside right

Senior career*
Years	Team	Apps	(Gls)
1950–1951	Bolton Wanderers	0	(0)
1951–1952	Colwyn Bay		
1952	Bradford City	12	(1)
Total		12	(1)
- * Club domestic league appearances and goals

George Francis Sheridan (30 October 1929 – 21 December 1986) was an English professional footballer who played as an outside right.

== Career ==
Born in Wigan, Sheridan spent his early career with Bolton Wanderers and Colwyn Bay. He signed for Bradford City in January 1952, making 12 league appearances for the club, before being released later in 1952.

== Sources ==
- Frost, Terry (1988). Bradford City A Complete Record 1903-1988. Breedon Books Sport. ISBN 0-907969-38-0.
