= George Plantagenet =

George Plantagenet may refer to:

- George Plantagenet, Duke of Bedford (1477–1479)
- George Plantagenet, Duke of Clarence (1449–1478)
