= George Kimball =

George Kimball may refer to:

- George E. Kimball (1906–1967), American quantum chemist
- George Edward Kimball (1943–2011), American author
- George Kimball (attorney), attorney in Canaan, New Hampshire who helped establish a school for African Americans
