= George Jamieson =

George Jamieson may refer to:

- George Jamieson (diplomat) (1843–1920), British diplomat and judge in East Asia
- George Auldjo Jamieson (1828–1900), Scottish businessman, chartered accountant and local councillor
- George W. Jamieson (1810–1868), American actor and lapidary
- George Jamieson, birth name of April Ashley
