= George Lunn =

George Lunn may refer to:

- George Lunn (British politician) (1861–1939), chairman and president of the Liberal Party
- George Lunn (footballer) (1915–2000), English footballer
- George R. Lunn (1873–1948), U.S. Socialist and Democratic politician
