= George McNaughton =

George McNaughton may refer to:

- George McNaughton (footballer) (1872-?), Scottish footballer, see List of Bury F.C. players (1–24 appearances)
- George Kerr McNaughton (1877-1951), Canadian politician
- Sir George Matthew McNaughton (1893-1966), British civil engineer
- George McNaughton (ice hockey) (1897-1991), Canadian ice hockey player
