= George Paice =

George Paice may refer to:

- George Paice (bowls) (1941–2024), New Zealand-based Falkland Islands lawn bowler
- George Paice (painter) (1854–1925), British landscape, canine, hunting, and equestrian painter
