= George Kollias =

George Kollias may refer to:

- George Kollias (biologist) (born 1958), Greek immunologist
- George Kollias (drummer) (born 1977), Greek drummer
