= George Ridley =

George Ridley may refer to:

- George Ridley (Whig politician) (1818–1887), Member of Parliament for Newcastle-upon-Tyne 1856–1860
- George Ridley (Labour politician) (1886–1944), Member of Parliament for Clay Cross 1936–1944
- George "Geordie" Ridley (1835–1864), writer of Blaydon Races
