= George Holland =

George Holland may refer to

- George Holland (actor) (1791–1870), stage actor
- George Holland (tennis), Australian tennis player
- George Calvert Holland (1801–1865), English physician
- George H. Holland, public official in Mississippi
