= George Ballard =

George Ballard may refer to:

- George Ballard (biographer) (1706–1755), English antiquary and writer
- George Alexander Ballard (1862–1948), British naval officer and historian
- Butch Ballard (George Edward Ballard, 1918–2011), American jazz drummer
- George Barrett (George Powell Ballard, 1888–1917), English anarchist
