= George Handford =

George Handford may refer to:

- George Clive Handford, bishop
- George Handford (composer), English composer
