= George Rendel =

George Rendel may refer to:

- George Wightwick Rendel (1833–1902), British engineer, and naval architect, son of James Meadows Rendel
- Sir George William Rendel (1889–1979), his son, British diplomat
