= George Staples =

George Staples may refer to:

- George McDade Staples (born 1947), American ambassador
- George E. Staples (1918–1993), veterinary researcher in animal nutrition
