= George Cory =

George Cory may refer to:

- George Cory (historian) (1862–1935), English-born South African chemist and historian
- George C. Cory Jr. (1920–1978), American pianist and composer
- George Norton Cory (1874–1968), Canadian-born and educated soldier with the British Army
