= George Hanger =

George Hanger may refer to:

- George Hanger, 4th Baron Coleraine (1751–1824), British soldier, author, and eccentric
- George Wallace William Hanger (1866–1935), labor negotiator for the Federal Board of Mediation and Conciliation
