= George Gund =

George Gund may refer to:

- George Gund III (1937–2013), owner of the Minnesota North Stars, Cleveland Barons, San Jose Sharks, and Cleveland Cavaliers
- George Gund II (1888–1966), American banker, art collector, and philanthropist

== See also ==
- The George Gund Foundation, a major philanthropic organization based in Cleveland, Ohio
