= George O'Hara =

George O'Hara may refer to:

- George O'Hara (actor) (1899–1966), American film actor and screenwriter of the silent film era
- George O'Hara (pseudonym), alias of Beatles musician George Harrison
- George O'Hara (footballer) (1933–2018), Scottish football player (Dundee FC, Queen of the South FC)
