= George Hayduke =

George Hayduke may refer to:

- George Hayduke (character), Edward Abbey character
- George Hayduke (author), American humorist
