= George Shipley =

George Shipley may refer to:

- George Shipley (footballer) (born 1959), English footballer
- George E. Shipley (1927–2003), U.S. Representative from Illinois
