= George Goschen =

George Goschen may refer to:

- George Goschen, 1st Viscount Goschen (1831–1907), British statesman and businessman
- George Goschen, 2nd Viscount Goschen (1866–1952), his son, British politician
- Georg Joachim Göschen (1752–1858), his grandfather, German publisher
