= George Barbier =

George Barbier may refer to:

- George Barbier (illustrator) (1882–1932), French illustrator
- George Barbier (actor) (1864–1945), American actor
