= George Tanner =

George Tanner may refer to:

- George Tanner (Australian footballer) (1914–1982), Australian rules footballer
- George Tanner (English footballer) (born 1999), English footballer for Bristol City
