= George Luke =

George Luke may refer to:

- George Luke (footballer, born 1933) (1933–2010), English football left-winger
- George Luke (footballer, born 1948), English football midfielder

== See also ==
- Luke George (born 1987), English rugby league player
- George Lucas (born TBA), American filmmaker
