= George Holliday =

George Holliday may refer to:

- George Holliday (bobsleigh) (1917–1990), British Olympic bobsledder
- George Holliday (1960–2021), American witness who videotaped the beating of Rodney King
