= George Hare =

George Hare may refer to:

- George Emlen Hare (1808–1892), American Protestant Episcopal clergyman
- George Hare Philipson (1836–1918), English physician
- Saint George Hare (1857–1933), an Irish painter
