= George Hahn =

George Hahn is the name of:

- George Philip Hahn (1879–1937), American judge
- George Hahn (politician) (1911–1963), Canadian Member of Parliament
- George W. Hahn (1894–1977), American orthodontist
