= George Haddock =

George Haddock may refer to:

- George Haddock (baseball) (1866–1926), American Major League Baseball pitcher
- George Haddock (politician) (1863–1930), British Conservative Party member of parliament (MP) for North Lonsdale, 1906–1918
- George Haddock (musician), (1823-1907), British violinist and music professor
