= George Selwyn =

George Selwyn may refer to:

- George Selwyn (politician) (1719–1791), English politician and wit
- George Selwyn (bishop of Lichfield) (1809–1878), first Bishop of New Zealand
- George Selwyn (bishop of Tinnevelly) (1887–1957), Anglican colonial bishop
