= George Widener =

George Widener may refer to:

- George Dunton Widener (1861–1912), American businessman who died in the sinking of the RMS Titanic
- George D. Widener Jr. (1889–1971), American thoroughbred racing owner and son of the above
- George Widener (politician) (1820–1901), American politician who represented the twentieth ward on the Philadelphia City Council; uncle of George Dunton Widener and great-uncle of George D. Widener Jr.
- George Widener (artist) (born 1962), self-taught artist
