= George Crabb =

George Crabb may refer to:

- George W. Crabb (1804–1846), U.S. Representative from Alabama
- George Crabb (writer) (1778–1851), English legal and miscellaneous writer
