= George Oxenden =

George Oxenden may refer to:

- Sir George Oxenden (governor) (1620–1669), first governor of the Bombay Presidency
- George Oxenden (lawyer) (1651–1703), English academic, lawyer and politician who sat in the House of Commons from 1685 to 1689
- Sir George Oxenden, 5th Baronet (1694–1775), English Whig politician who sat in the House of Commons from 1720 to 1754
