= George Riddell =

George Riddell may refer to:

- George Riddell, 1st Baron Riddell (1865–1934), British solicitor, newspaper proprietor and public servant
- George W. Riddell, Pinkerton labor spy who infiltrated the Western Federation of Miners in Telluride
