= George Staunton =

George Staunton may refer to:

- Sir George Staunton, 1st Baronet (1737–1801), diplomat and Orientalist
- Sir George Staunton, 2nd Baronet (1781–1859), his son, a traveller and Orientalist
