= George Spriggs =

George Spriggs may refer to:

- George Spriggs (baseball) (1937–2020), American baseball player
- George Spriggs (politician) (1926–2015), Australian politician
