= George Dick =

George Dick may refer to:

- George Frederick Dick (1881–1967), American physician and bacteriologist
- George Dick (Governor of Bombay) (1739–1818), Governor of Bombay, 1792–1795
- George Dick (footballer) (1921–1960), Scottish guardsman, boxer, and professional footballer and manager
- George W. Dick (born 1964), American writer, actor, director and musician

== See also ==
- George Deek (born c. 1984), Arab-Israeli diplomat
