= George Alcorn =

George Alcorn may refer to:

- George Edward Alcorn Jr. (1940–2024), American physicist, engineer, inventor, and professor
- George Oscar Alcorn (1850–1930), Canadian lawyer and politician
