= George Dempster =

George Dempster may refer to:

- George Dempster of Dunnichen (1732–1818), Scots lawyer and member of Parliament
- George Roby Dempster (1887–1964), American industrialist, inventor and mayor
- George Dempster (footballer), Australian rules footballer
