= George Weidler =

George Weidler may refer to:

- George Washington Weidler (1837–1908), American businessman
- George William Weidler (1926–1989), American saxophonist
