= George Guy =

George Guy may refer to:

- Buddy Guy (born 1936), American blues guitarist and singer
- George Guy (footballer) (1896–1975), English footballer
- George Guy (trade unionist) (1918–2005), British trade unionist
- George F. Guy (1904–1980), American politician
