= George Altman (disambiguation) =

George Altman (1933–2025) was an American baseball player.

George or Georges Altman may also refer to:

- George Altman, a character in Suburgatory
- Georges Altman (1901–1960), French journalist and resistance fighter
