= George Ripley =

George Ripley may refer to:

- George Ripley (alchemist) (died 1490), English author and alchemist
- George Ripley (transcendentalist) (1802–1880), American social reformer, Unitarian minister and journalist
