= George Crawley =

George Crawley may refer to:

- George A. Crawley (1864–1926), British artist and designer
- George Baden Crawley (1833–1879), railway contractor
