= George Moss =

George Moss may refer to:

- George Moss (politician) (1913–1985), Australian politician
- George Moss (rapper) (born 1982), American Christian hip hop musician

== See also ==
- George Mosse, German-American social and cultural historian
