= George Wylie =

George Wylie or Wyllie may refer to:

- George Wylie (politician) (1848–1926), American politician in Wisconsin
- George Wyllie (British Army soldier) (1908–1987), Royal Engineer awarded the George Cross
- George Wyllie (1921–2012), Scottish artist
