= George Shiras =

George Shiras may refer to:

- George Shiras Jr.(1832–1924), associate justice of the U.S. Supreme Court
- George Shiras III (1859–1942), U.S. Representative from Pennsylvania and son of George Shiras Jr.
