= George Armitstead =

George Armitstead may refer to:

- George Armitstead, 1st Baron Armitstead (1824–1912), British businessman, philanthropist and Liberal politician
- George Armitstead (mayor) (1847–1912), engineer, entrepreneur and mayor of Riga
