= George Chance =

George Chance may refer to:

- George Chance (footballer) (1896–1952), English professional footballer
- George Chance (photographer) (1885–1963), New Zealand pictorialist photographer
- Sir (George) Jeremy ffolliott Chance (1926–2017), of the Chance baronets
- George Quentin Chance (1904–?), Irish radiologist
