= George Baillie =

George Baillie may refer to:

- George Baillie (MP, born 1664) (1664–1738), Scottish MP for Berwickshire, 1708–1734
- George Baillie (merchant) (1757–1809), Scottish merchant, slave trader and author
- George Baillie (MP, born 1763) (1763–1841), Scottish MP for Berwickshire, 1796–1818
- George Baillie (ice hockey) (1919–2014), British-Canadian ice hockey player
