= George Seitz =

George Seitz may refer to:

- George Seitz (politician) (1941–2015), Labor member of the Legislative Assembly in Victoria, Australia
- George A. Seitz (1897–1947), officer in the United States Navy
- George B. Seitz (1888–1944), American playwright, screenwriter, film actor and director
- George Seitz (1894–1976), American cold-case murder victim
