= George Clare =

George Clare may refer to:

- George Adam Clare (1854–1915), Canadian businessman, manufacturer and politician in Preston, Ontario
- George Clare (writer) (1920–2009), British Jewish author who wrote Last Waltz in Vienna
- George William Burdett Clare (1889–1917), English recipient of the Victoria Cross
