= George Hellmuth =

George Hellmuth may refer to:

- George W. Hellmuth (1870–1955), American architect
- George F. Hellmuth (1907–1999), American architect; son of George W. Hellmuth
