= George Barry =

George Barry or Barrie may refer to:

- George Barry (author) (1748–1805), author of a History of the Orkney Islands
- George Richard Barry (1825–1867), Member of the UK Parliament for Cork County
- George Barrie (1912–2002), owner and CEO of Fabergé Inc.
- George Barrie (footballer) (1904–?), Scottish football player
