= George Nye =

George Nye may refer to:

- George D. Nye (1898–1969), American politician of the Democratic party
- G. Raymond Nye (1889–1965), American actor
