= George Hitchcock =

George Hitchcock may refer to:

- George Hitchcock (artist) (1850–1913), American artist
- George Hitchcock (poet) (1914–2010), American actor, poet and publisher
- George B. Hitchcock (1812–1872), American involved in housing slaves on their way to freedom
