= George Hansen =

George Hansen may refer to:

- George V. Hansen (1930–2014), American politician from Idaho
- George Hansen (Canadian football) (1934–2017), Canadian football player
