= George Carstairs =

George Carstairs may refer to:

- George Carstairs (rugby league), Australian rugby league player
- George Carstairs (missionary) (1880–1948), Scottish missionary in India
- George Morrison Carstairs (1916–1991), known as Morris Carstairs, British psychiatrist, his son
