= George Wilcox =

George Wilcox may refer to:

- George Wilcox (1866–1942), founder of Australian business George Wilcox & Co
- George Norton Wilcox (1839–1933), politician in the Kingdom of Hawaii
