= George Bartholomew =

George Bartholomew may refer to:

- George Bartholomew (inventor), American inventor credited with the invention of concrete pavement
- George A. Bartholomew (1919–2006), American biologist
- George M. Bartholomew (1812–1885), co-founder of Lodi, Wisconsin
