= George Cuthbertson =

George Cuthbertson may refer to:

- George Adrian Cuthbertson (1898–1969), Canadian marine painter and industrial artist
- George Harding Cuthbertson (1929–2017), Canadian yacht designer, founder of C&C Yachts
