= George Fenwicke =

English clergyman and religious writer

George Fenwicke, B.D. (1690–1760) was an English clergyman and religious writer.

== Life ==
Fenwicke was educated at St. John's College, Cambridge, graduating B.A. in 1708/9 and M.A. in 1712. He was elected a Fellow of St John's on 29 March 1710. He resigned his fellowship in March 1722, and was presented to the rectory of Hallaton, Leicestershire, which he held until his death.

Here, as a condition of holding certain land bequeathed many years previously to the rector, he had to contribute every Easter Monday a sermon, two hare-pies, a quantity of ale, and two dozen penny loaves. The provisions, after divine service and a sermon, were carried in procession to a mound called ‘Harepies Bank,’ thrown into a hole, and scrambled for by the men, women, and children assembled, causing disorder. Another bequest from Mrs. Parker, a widow, the rector expended in providing a home for three poor women or poor men of the parish.

He died 10 April 1760, according to the inscription on a mural tablet which is placed outside the church against the north wall of the chancel.

== Works ==
In James Darling's Cyclopædia Bibliographica Fenwicke is called a Hutchinsonian. He published a visitation sermon in 1736, one on the smallpox in 1737, and two other sermons in 1738. He was also the author of:

- The Friendly Monitor for Rich and Poor.
- Help for the Sincere in Plain Meditations, London, 1737.
- Thoughts on the Hebrew Titles of the Psalms, London, 1749; new edition, 1855.
- The Psalter in its Original Form, 1759.
