= George Lennox =

George Lennox may refer to:

- Lord George Lennox (1737–1805), British Army officer and politician
  - Lord George Lennox (politician) (1793-1873), British Army officer and politician, grandson of previous
- George Lennox (footballer), Irish footballer
