= George Cave =

George Cave may refer to:

- George Cave, 1st Viscount Cave (1856–1928), British lawyer and politician
- George Cave (footballer) (1874–1904), English footballer
- George W. Cave (1929–2026), CIA operations officer and authority on Iran
