= George Cockerill =

George Cockerill may refer to:

- Sir George Cockerill (British Army officer) (1867–1957), British Army officer and Conservative Member of Parliament for Reigate 1918–1931
- George Cockerill (journalist) (1871–1943), Australian journalist and writer
