= George Spratt =

George Spratt may refer to:

- George A. Spratt (1870–1934), inventor and aircraft patentee
- George W. Spratt (1844–1934), American manufacturer and politician
