= George Waring =

George Waring is the name of:

- George Waring (actor) (1925–2010), British actor
- George D. Waring (1819–1893), American politician
- George E. Waring Jr. (1833–1898), American sanitary engineer and civic reformer
- George Waring (footballer) (born 1994), English footballer
