= George Rust (disambiguation) =

George Rust (1788–1857) was an American soldier, plantation owner and Virginia politician.

George Rust may also refer to:

- George Rust (bishop) (died 1670), English Anglican bishop
- George W. Rust (1815–1888), American Civil War physician and politician
