= George Thackeray =

George Thackeray may refer to:

- George Thackeray (book-collector and priest) (1777–1850)
- George Thackeray (cricketer and priest) (1806–1875)
