= George Huff =

George Huff may refer to:

- George Huff (coach) (1872–1936), American football and baseball coach at the University of Illinois, manager of the Boston Americans
- George Huff (singer) (born 1980), American singer, American Idol finalist
- George Franklin Huff (1842–1912), U.S. Representative from Pennsylvania, banker, and businessman
- George Albert Huff (died 1934), merchant and political figure in British Columbia
