= George Dunlap =

George Dunlap may refer to:

- George W. Dunlap (1813–1880), U.S. Representative from Kentucky
- George Dunlap (golfer) (1908–2003), American amateur golfer
- George L. Dunlap, president of the Chicago & North Western Railway
