= George Sternberg =

George Sternberg may refer to:

- George Miller Sternberg (1838–1915), U.S. Army physician and bacteriologist
- George F. Sternberg (1883–1969), American paleontologist
