= George Dowell =

George Dowell may refer to:

- George Dare Dowell (1831–1910), Royal Marines officer and Victoria Cross recipient
- George W. Dowell, American attorney and political candidate
