= George Wadsworth =

George Wadsworth may refer to:

- George Wadsworth (politician) (1902–1979), British Liberal politician and businessman
- George Wadsworth II (1893–1958), United States diplomat
