= George Broadbent =

George Broadbent may refer to:

- George Robert Broadbent (1863–1947), Australian cyclist and map publisher
- George Broadbent (footballer) (born 2000), English footballer
- Sir George Walter Broadbent, 4th Baronet (1935–1992), of the Broadbent baronets
