= George Bradbury =

George Bradbury may refer to:

- George Bradbury (American politician) (1770–1823), US Representative from Massachusetts
- George Bradbury (judge) (died 1696), English judge
- George Henry Bradbury (1859–1925), Canadian politician
