= George Parkin =

George Parkin may refer to:

- George Parkin (cricketer) (1864–1933), Australian cricketer
- George Parkin (footballer) (1903–1971), English footballer
- George Robert Parkin (1846–1922), Canadian educator
