= George Horsey =

George Horsey may refer to:

- George Horsey (landowner) (c.1588–1645), English landowner and politician
- George Horsey (MP, died 1588) (1526–1588), English politician
- George Horsey (priest), Dean of Ross, Ireland, 1637–1639
