= George McKelvey =

George McKelvey may refer to:

- George McKelvey (mayor), American politician, mayor of Youngstown, Ohio
- George McKelvey (soccer), Scottish-American soccer player
- George McKelvey (lawman), constable of Charleston, Arizona Territory in 1881
