= George Smeaton =

George Smeaton may refer to:

- George Smeaton (footballer) (1917–1978), Australian rules footballer
- George Smeaton (theologian) (1814–1889), Scottish theologian

== See also ==
- George Smeeton (fl. 1800–1828), English printer and compiler
