= George Draper =

George Draper may refer to:

- George A. Draper (1855–1923), American textile industrialist
- George W. Draper III (born 1953), judge on the Supreme Court of Missouri
- George Draper (physician) (1880–1959), American physician consulted by Franklin Roosevelt on his paralysis
