= George Donnelly =

George Donnelly may refer to:

- George Donnelly (footballer) (born 1988), English footballer
- George Donnelly (American football) (1942–2022), American football player
- George Joseph Donnelly (1889–1950), American Roman Catholic clergyman
