= George Harlow =

George Harlow may refer to:

- George Henry Harlow (1787–1819), English portrait painter
- George H. Harlow (1830–1900), American politician
