= George Wharton =

George Wharton may refer to:

- Sir George Wharton, 1st Baronet (1617–1681), English Royalist soldier, astrologer and poet
- George Wharton (died 1609) (1583–1609), MP for Westmorland
