= George Geddes =

George Geddes may refer to:

- George Geddes (engineer) (1809–1883), engineer, agricultural expert, and New York state senator
- George W. Geddes (1824–1892), U.S. Representative from Ohio
