= George Hilton =

George Hilton may refer to:

- George Hilton (actor) (1934–2019), Uruguayan actor, born Jorge Hill Acosta y Lara
- George Hilton (historian) (1925–2014), American economist and historian
- George Hilton (politician) (born 1971), Brazilian politician, pastor, and radio personality
