= George Birch =

George Birch may refer to:

- George Birch (mayor) (died 1632), English mayor of Norwich
- George Birch (businessman) (1862–1917), Australian businessman
- George Birch (footballer) (born 2006), English footballer
