= George Strahan =

George Strahan may refer to:

- George Strahan (colonial administrator), British military officer and colonial administrator
- George Strahan (publisher), Scottish bookseller and publisher
- George Strahan (engineer), British army engineer
