= George Giles =

George Giles may refer to:

- George Giles (cyclist), New Zealand track and road cyclist
- George Giles (baseball), Negro leagues first baseman and manager
- George Michael James Giles, English surgeon and entomologist

== See also ==
- George Gyles, Canadian sailor
