= George Clymer (disambiguation) =

George Clymer (1739–1813) was an American politician and founding father.

George Clymer may also refer to:

- George E. Clymer (1754?–1834), American engineer and inventor
- USS George Clymer, a 1941 Arthur Middleton-class attack transport
