= George Bassett (disambiguation) =

George Bassett (1818–1886) was an English businessman.

George Bassett or Basset may also refer to:

- George Basset (or Bassett, c. 1524–c. 1580), English M.P. from Cornwall
- George Bassett (Australian politician) (1888–1972), New South Wales politician
- George Bassett, character in The Rockford Files (season 5)
