= George Crenshaw =

George Crenshaw may refer to:

- George Crenshaw (racing driver), former NASCAR driver
- George L. Crenshaw, banker and developer
- George Webster Crenshaw, cartoonist and creator of the comic strip Belvedere
