= George Compton =

George Compton may refer to:

- George Compton (Canadian politician) (1872–1950), politician in Manitoba, Canada
- George Compton, 4th Earl of Northampton (1664–1727), British peer
- George Compton, 6th Earl of Northampton (1692–1758), British peer and Member of Parliament
