= George Legge =

George Legge may refer to:

- George Legge, 1st Baron Dartmouth (c. 1647–1691), Admiral of the Fleet and Master-General of the Ordnance
- George Legge, Viscount Lewisham (c. 1703–1732), heir apparent of William Legge, 1st Earl of Dartmouth
- George Legge, 3rd Earl of Dartmouth (1755–1810), British politician
- George Legge (footballer) (1886–1915), Scottish footballer
