= George Lyle =

George Lyle may refer to:

- George B. Lyle, interim mayor of Atlanta in 1942
- George Lyle (ice hockey) (born 1953), professional ice hockey player
