= George Schuster =

George Schuster may refer to:

- George Schuster (driver) (1873–1972), driver of the American built Thomas Flyer and winner of the 1908 New York to Paris Auto Race
- Sir George Schuster (public servant) (1881–1982), British barrister, financier, colonial administrator and Liberal politician
