= George Skene =

George Skene may refer to:

- George Skene (physician) (1741–1803), Scottish physician
- George Skene (politician) (1749-1825), Scottish army officer and politician
- Provost Skene (1619-1708) (Sir George Skene of Fintray), Provost of Aberdeen, 1676-85; Scottish merchant
