= George McFarland (disambiguation) =

George McFarland (1928–1993) was an American actor, known for the role of Spanky.

George McFarland may also refer to:

- George B. McFarland (1866–1942), American physician in Siam
- George F. McFarland (1834–1891), American Civil War army officer
