= George Waddell =

George Waddell may refer to:

- George Waddell (figure skater) (born 1998), British-Canadian ice dancer
- George Waddell (footballer) (1888–1966), Scottish footballer
