= George Vaillant =

George Vaillant is the name of:

- George Clapp Vaillant (1901–1945), American anthropologist
- George Eman Vaillant (born 1934), American psychiatrist
