= George Duggan =

George Duggan may refer to:

- George Duggan (politician) (1812–1876), lawyer, judge and political figure in Canada West
- George Duggan (priest) (1912–2012), New Zealand Marist priest, philosopher, seminary professor and writer
- George Duggan, character in Silk (TV series)
