= George Hibbard =

George Hibbard may refer to:

- George A. Hibbard (1864–1910), mayor of Boston, 1908–1910
- George E. Hibbard (1924–1991), American art collector
- George F. Hibbard (1848–1934), merchant and political figure in New Brunswick, Canada
