= George Troup (disambiguation) =

George Troup may refer to:

- George Troup (1780–1856), American politician from the U.S. state of Georgia
- George Troup (architect) (1863–1941), New Zealand architect and statesman
- George Troup (journalist) (1821–1879), Scottish newspaper editor
