= George Chubb (disambiguation) =

George Chubb, 1st Baron Hayter (1848–1946), was a British businessman.

George Chubb may also refer to:

- George Chubb, 3rd Baron Hayter (1911–2003), British industrialist and politician
- George Chubb (cricketer)

== See also ==
- Chubb (disambiguation)
