= George Blumenthal =

George Blumenthal may refer to:

- George R. Blumenthal (born 1945), American astrophysicist and chancellor of the University of California, Santa Cruz
- George Blumenthal (banker) (1858–1941), head of the US branch of Lazard
- George Heinrich Blumenthal (1872–1929), German Land Reformer
- George Blumenthal, co-founder in 1993 of International CableTel, the precursor to Virgin Media

== See also ==
- George Blumenthal House, New York City
