= George Tomline =

George Tomline is the name of

- George Pretyman Tomline (1750–1827), Bishop of Lincoln and Winchester, Dean of St Paul's and confidant of Pitt the Younger
- George Tomline (politician) (1813–1889), Member of Parliament for various constituencies
