= George Whitby =

George Whitby may refer to:

- George Roland Whitby (1878–1966), British tea planter, businessman and member of parliament
- George S. Whitby (1887–1972), head of the University of Akron rubber laboratory
- George Whitby (rugby league)
