= George Weldon (disambiguation) =

George Weldon (1908–1963) was an English conductor.

George Weldon may refer to:

- George Weldon (deputy governor) (died 1697), English merchant and deputy governor of Bombay
- George and Thomas Weldon (fl. 1850s), Irish born builder from Mississippi
