= George Snyder =

George Snyder may refer to:

- George Snyder (politician) (1929–2017), Maryland State Senate majority leader, 1971–1974
- George Snyder (baseball) (1848–1905), Major League Baseball pitcher
- George W. Snyder (1780–1841), watchmaker and inventor
- George A. Snyder (1852–1932), American farmer and politician from New York
