= George Raynor (disambiguation) =

George Raynor (1907–1985) was an English footballer.

George Raynor may also refer to:

- George Raynor (cricketer) (1852–1887), English schoolmaster and cricketer
- George Raynor (pirate) (1665–1743), pirate active in the Indian Ocean
