= George Kittredge =

George Kittredge may refer to:

- George W. Kittredge (1805–1881), U.S. Representative from New Hampshire
- George Lyman Kittredge (1860–1941), American professor of English literature
- George Kittredge (Navy captain), United States Navy captain
