= George Germain =

George Germain may refer to:

- George Germain, 1st Viscount Sackville (1716–1785), British soldier and politician
- George W. Germain (1818–1906), member of the Michigan House of Representatives
