= George Watters =

George Watters may refer to:

- George Manker Watters (1890–1943), American playwright, screenwriter, theatre manager, and film industry executive, also known as George D. Watters
- George Watters (soldier) (1904–1980), British soldier
- George Watters II (born 1949), American sound editor
