= George Barne =

George Barne may refer to:

- George Barne (bishop) (1879–1954), cricketer who in 1932 became Bishop of Lahore
- Sir George Barne (died 1558), London politician of the mid-16th century
- Sir George Barne (died 1593) (1532–1593), London politician of the late 16th century
