= George Brodie =

George Brodie may refer to:

- George Brodie of Ailisk, Member of the Parliament of Scotland for Elginshire and Forres
- George Brodie (New Zealand politician), 19th century Member of Parliament in New Zealand
- George Brodie (historian) (1786–1867), Scottish historian
