= George Grantham (economic historian) =

American economist and historian

- Born: May 11, 1941 (age 85)

Academic background
- Education: Yale University (M.A. and Ph.D.(M.A.)
- Influences: John Maynard Keynes; Adam Smith

Academic work
- Discipline: Economic history, Agricultural economics
- Institutions: McGill University
- Awards: Clio Can 2000
- Website: Information at IDEAS / RePEc

George Grantham (also George W. Grantham) (born May 11, 1941) is an American economic historian and Emeritus Professor at McGill University. His contribution to economics has focused mainly on the agricultural development, particularly of the French rural economy in the 18th and 19th centuries. For many years before his retirement in 2009, he was a prominent teacher of economics at McGill University and in 2000 he was awarded the Cliometric Society's annual prize – the Clio Can for exceptional support to the field of cliometrics.

== Selected publications ==
=== Books ===
- Grantham, G. & MacKinnon, M. (1994). Labour market evolution: The economic history of market integration, wage flexibility, and the employment relation. London: Routledge.

=== Papers ===
- Grantham, G. (1989). Agricultural supply during the Industrial Revolution: French evidence and European implications. The Journal of Economic History, 49(01), 43–72.
- Grantham, G.W. (1993) Divisions of labour: agricultural productivity and occupational specialization in pre‐industrial France, The Economic History Review, Volume 46, Issue 3, pp. 478–502, August
- Grantham, G.W. (1997) The French cliometric revolution: A survey of cliometric contributions to French economic history,European Review of Economic History, Volume 1, Issue 3, pp. 353–405
- Grantham, G.W., and Sarget, M. N. (1997). Espaces privilégiés: productivité agraire et zones d'approvisionnement des villes dans l'Europe préindustrielle. Annales, 695–725.
