= George McGuire =

George McGuire may refer to:

- George Albert McGuire (1871–1955), Canadian politician
- George Alexander McGuire (1866–1934), Antiguan-American clergyman
- George James McGuire, Grenadian politician
