= George Geary (disambiguation) =

George Geary (1893–1981) was an English cricketer.

George Geary may also refer to:

- George Reginald Geary (1872–1954), Canadian politician
- George Geary, character in Fear the Walking Dead
