= George Dickerson (disambiguation) =

George Dickerson is an American actor, writer and poet.

George Dickerson may also refer to:

- George Dickerson (baseball) (1892–1938), Major League Baseball pitcher
- George W. Dickerson (1913–2002), American football player
