= George Bagby =

George Bagby is the name of:

- George Bagby (author) (1906–1985), American novelist
- George William Bagby (1828–1883), American librarian
- George Bagby (politician) (born 1937), Democratic member of the Wyoming House of Representatives
