= George Weatherill =

George Weatherill may refer to:

- George Weatherill (politician) (1936–2021), former member of South Australian parliament
- George Weatherill (footballer) (1900–1986), Australian rules football player

== See also ==
- George Wetherall (1788–1868), British Army officer
- George Wetherill (1925–2006), American planetary scientist
