= George Lodge =

George Lodge may refer to:

- George C. Lodge (born 1927), American academic and politician
- George Cabot Lodge (1873–1909), American poet
- George Edward Lodge (1860–1954), British bird artist
