= George Shelley =

George Shelley may refer to:

- George Shelley (singer) (born 1993), former member of Union J
- George M. Shelley (1849–1927), mayor of Kansas City, Missouri, 1878–1879
- George Ernest Shelley (1840–1910), English geologist and ornithologist
