= George Stallings (disambiguation) =

George Stallings may refer to:

- George Stallings (1867-1929), American baseball manager and catcher.
- Vernon Stallings (1891-1963), American cartoonist, son of George Stallings, sometimes credited as George Stallings
- George Augustus Stallings Jr. (born 1948), American religious leader
- George B. Stallings Jr., (1918-2018), Florida politician
