= George Cumming =

George Cumming is the name of:

- George Cumming (politician) (1752–1834), Scottish MP for Inverness
- George Cumming (golfer) (1879–1950), Scottish-Canadian professional golfer and club maker
