= George Bogle =

George Bogle may refer to:

- George Bogle of Daldowie (1700–1784), Glasgow merchant
- George Bogle (diplomat) (1746–1781), his son, first British diplomat to visit Tibet
