= George Donaldson =

George Donaldson may refer to:

- George Donaldson (musician) (1968–2014), Scottish musician and a member of Irish singing group Celtic Thunder
- George Donaldson (footballer) (born 1954), Scottish footballer with Rangers and Hearts
