= George Whitworth =

George Whitworth may refer to:

- George F. Whitworth (1816–1907), American missionary
- George Whitworth (footballer, born 1896) (1896–?), English footballer
- George Whitworth (footballer, born 1927) (1927–2006), English footballer
