= George Susce =

George Susce may refer to:

- George Susce (catcher) (1907–1986), major league catcher from 1929 to 1944
- George Susce (pitcher) (1931–2010), major league pitcher from 1955 to 1959
