= George Batten =

George Batten may refer to:

- George Batten (advertiser) (1854–1918), opened the George Batten Newspaper Advertising Agency in New York City, 1891
- George Batten (baseball) (1891–1972), infielder in Major League Baseball
- George W. Batten (1856–1922), American businessman and politician, New York State Treasurer
