= George Brunner =

George Brunner may refer to:

- George Brunner (bishop) (1889–1969), Roman Catholic bishop of Middlesbrough
- George E. Brunner (1896–1975), American politician from New Jersey
- George Brunner (composer), American composer and performer
