= George Albright =

George Albright may refer to:

- George W. Albright (1846–c. 1944), African-American politician from Mississippi
- George Albright (Florida politician) (born 1959), politician from Florida
