= George McGill =

George McGill may refer to:

- George McGill (Kansas politician) (1879–1963), United States senator from Kansas
- George McGill (Arkansas politician) (born 1946), mayor of Fort Smith, Arkansas and member of the Arkansas House of Representatives
- George McGill (RCAF officer) (1918–1944), Royal Canadian Air Force officer
