= George DeTitta =

George DeTitta may refer to:

- George DeTitta Sr. (1930–2024), set decorator
- George DeTitta Jr. (born 1955), set decorator, son of the above
