= George Jenks =

George Jenks may refer to:

- George A. Jenks (1836–1908), politician from Pennsylvania and Solicitor General
- George C. Jenks (1850–1929), English-born American dime novelist
