= George Foley =

George Foley may refer to:

- George Foley (politician) (1872–1945)
- George Foley (actor)
