= George Hampel =

George Hampel may refer to:

- George Hampel (judge) (1933–2024), Australian barrister and judge
- George Hampel (politician) (1885–1954), Milwaukee bookseller and legislator
