= George Gross =

George Gross may refer to:

- George Gross (fashion) Australian dress designer
- George Gross (journalist) (1923–2008), Canadian sport journalist
- George Gross (American football) (1941–2010), American football defensive tackle
- George Gross (water polo) (born 1952), Canadian Olympic water polo player

== See also ==
- George Grosz (sometimes "Gross") (1893–1959), German artist known especially for his caricatural drawings and paintings of Berlin life in the 1920s.
