= George Byers =

George Byers may refer to:

- George Byers (footballer) (born 1996), Scottish footballer for Sheffield Wednesday
- George Byers (canoeist) (1916–1995), American sprint canoer
- George Byers (boxer) (1872–1937), Canadian-American boxer
