= George Bickham =

George Bickham may refer to:

- George Bickham the Elder (1684–1758), English writing master and engraver
- George Bickham the Younger (c. 1706–1771), English etcher and engraver
