= George Sargent =

George Sargent may refer to:

- George Sargent (businessman) (1859–1921), Australian
- George Sargent (golfer) (1882–1962), English
