= George Robbins =

George Robbins may refer to:

- George R. Robbins (1808–1875), U.S. Representative from New Jersey
- G. Collier Robbins (1823–c. 1907/1908), mayor of Portland, Oregon, U.S., 1860–1861
- George Robbins (footballer) (1903–1998), Australian rules footballer
