= George Witt =

George Witt may refer to:

- George Witt (baseball) (1933–2013), American baseball player
- George Witt (collector) (1804–1869), doctor, banker and mayor known for his collection of erotic objects
- George Witt (politician) (1863–1925), American politician in the state of Washington
