= George Richmond =

George Richmond may refer to:

- George Richmond (painter) (1809–1896), English painter
- George H. Richmond (1944–2004), American educator
- George N. Richmond (1821–1896), Wisconsin legislator
- George Richmond (cinematographer), British cinematographer
