= George Pugh =

George Pugh may refer to:

- George E. Pugh, American politician from Ohio
- George Pugh (rugby union), Australian rugby union player
- George Pugh (American football), American football player and coach
