= George Stobbart =

George Stobbart or Stobart may refer to:

- George Stobbart (Broken Sword), a video game character
- George Stobbart (footballer) (1921–1995), English footballer
- George Kinnear Stobart, commandant of Harperley POW Camp 93, 1945–1948
- George Herbert Stobart, High Sheriff of Durham, 1925
