= George Heneage (disambiguation) =

George Heneage (1800–1864) was a British Whig and later Conservative Party politician.

George Heneage may also refer to:

- George Heneage (priest) (1483–1549), Dean of Lincoln
- George Heneage (16th century MP), Member of Parliament (MP) for Great Grimsby and Orford
