= George Tully =

George Tully may refer to:

- George Tully (American football) (1904–1980), American football player
- George Tully (architect) (died 1770), British architect
- George Tully (fencer) (1914–1986), Canadian Olympic fencer
