= George Chan =

George Chan may refer to:

- George B. Chan (1921–1998), American art director
- George Chan Hong Nam (born 1936), former Deputy Chief Minister of Sarawak
