= George Stratton =

George Stratton may refer to:

- George Stratton (politician) (c. 1734–1800), East India Company official and politician
- George Frederick Stratton (1779–c. 1834), English landowner and Fellow of the Royal Society
- George M. Stratton (1865–1957), American psychologist
- George Stratton (1897–1954), British violinist
