= Jorien =

Jorien is a masculine and feminine Dutch given name. Notable people with the name include:

- Jorien ter Mors (born 1989), Dutch speed skater
- Jorien van den Herik (born 1943), Dutch businessman
- Jorien Voorhuis (born 1984), Dutch speed skater
- Jorien Wuite (born 1964), Sint Maarten politician
