= George Pimentel (photographer) =

Canadian photographer (born 20th century

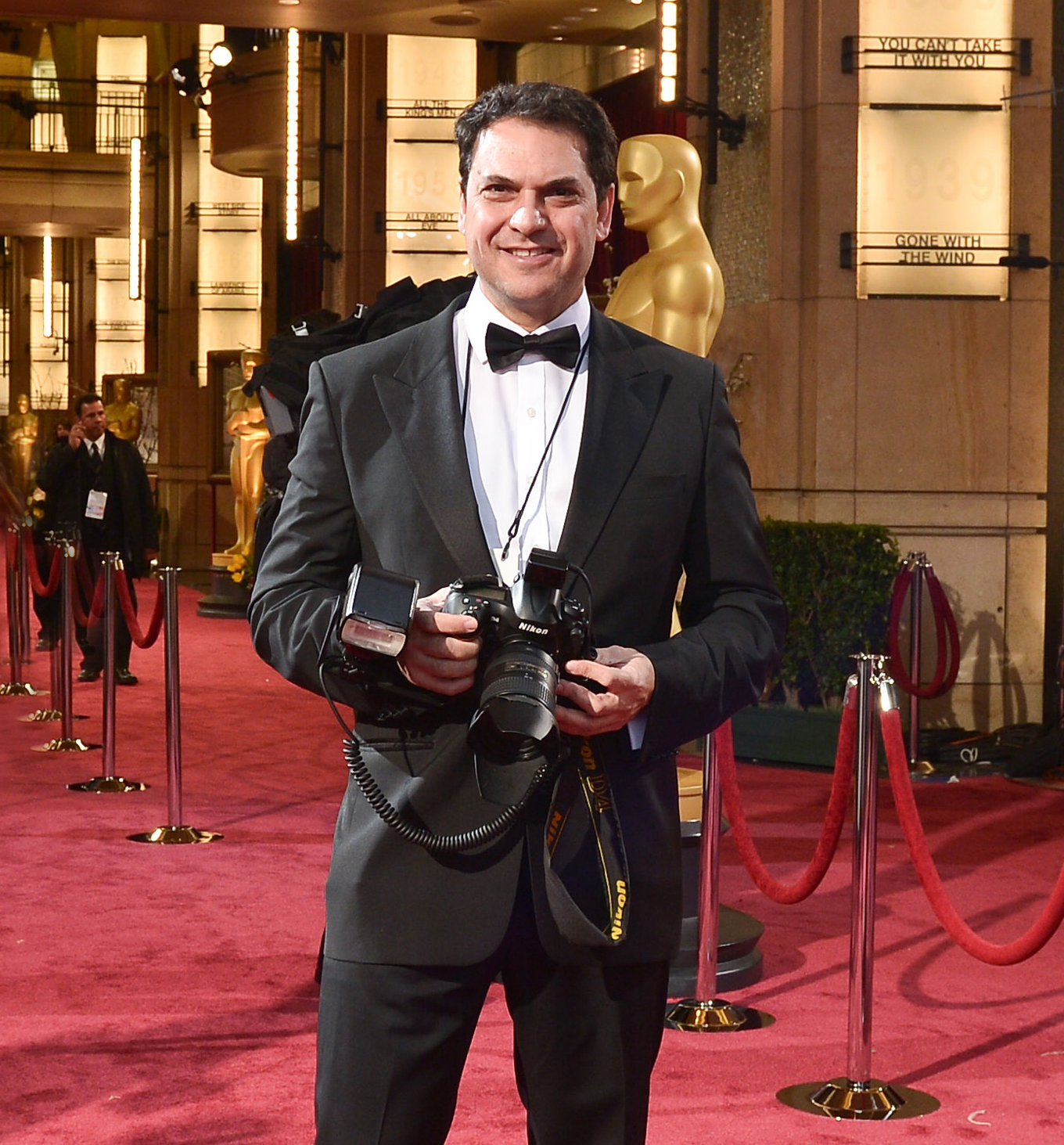
- George Pimentel at the 2019 Academy Awards
- Education: Ryerson University
- Years active: 1993–present

George Pimentel (born 20th century) is a Toronto-based celebrity photographer. He has covered the Oscars, the Cannes Film Festival, the Met Gala, the Venice Film Festival, and the Toronto International Film Festival.

== Personal life ==
Pimentel is a third-generation photographer in his family. He is married with two children. His grandfather was the town photographer in a small island of the Azores and both his father and uncle were also photographers. Through the late 1970s and 1980s, he spent Saturdays helping his father photograph weddings out of a family business in Little Portugal.

He graduated from Ryerson University.

== Career ==
Pimental got his start in 1993 when he was mistaken for a credentialed photographer at the Toronto International Film Festival and managed to get a shot of Robert DeNiro.

Over 30 years, Pimentel worked his way up from being a streetside photographer to being invited to cover A-list events. His subjects have included Beyoncé, Tom Cruise, Madonna, Lady Gaga, Jennifer Aniston and Taylor Swift, among many others.

His work has appeared in People, Vanity Fair and Vogue, among other outlets.

Pimental's photographs were exhibited at Yorkdale Shopping Centre at a 2023 monthlong retrospective called "30 Years of Red Carpet Style with George Pimentel."

During the COVID-19 pandemic, Pimentel catalyzed Canada COVID Project, a collaborative photography initiative to document Canada during COVID.
