= George Affleck =

George Affleck may refer to:

- George Affleck (footballer) (1888–?), Scottish footballer
- George Affleck (entrepreneur) (born 1964), Canadian politician and businessman
- George B. Affleck (1874–1958), American football and basketball coach
