= George Thomason =

George Thomason may refer to:

- George Thomason (book collector)
- George Thomason (footballer)
