= George Hobart =

George Hobart may refer to:

- George Hobart, 3rd Earl of Buckinghamshire (1731–1804), British peer
- George S. Hobart (1875–1938), American politician in New Jersey
- George V. Hobart (1867-1926) Canadian-American playwright and humorist
