= George Tranter =

George Tranter may refer to:

- George Tranter (footballer, born 1886), England football player
- George Tranter (footballer, born 1915), England football player
