= George Challis =

George Challis may refer to:

- George Challis (Australian rules footballer) (1891–1916)
- George Challis (rugby league) (1889–1965), Australian rugby league footballer
- Max Brand (1892–1944), American western author
