= George Holloway =

George Holloway may refer to:

- Bud Holloway (born 1988), Canadian ice hockey player
- Lofty Holloway, fictional character from EastEnders
- George Holloway (politician) (1825–1892), British Member of Parliament for Stroud
- George Holloway (cricketer) (1884–1966), English cricketer
