= George Hobson =

George Hobson may refer to:

- George Andrew Hobson (1854–1917), British civil engineer and bridge builder
- George Hobson (footballer) (1903–1993), English footballer
- George H. Hobson (1908–2001), American athlete and sports coach
