= George Torrance =

George Torrance may refer to:

- George William Torrance (1835–1907), Irish composer in Australia
- George Torrance (footballer) (born 1957), Scottish footballer
