= George Southwick =

George Southwick may refer to:

- George N. Southwick (1863–1912), American politician in New York state
- George Southwick (Canadian politician) (1808–1891), physician and politician in Canada West
