= George Bullard =

George Bullard may refer to:

- George Bullard (baseball) (1928–2002), American baseball player
- George Purdy Bullard (1869–1924), American lawyer and Democratic Party politician
