= George Butt =

George Butt may refer to:

- George Butt (priest) (1741–1795), British poet, teacher and cleric
- George Butt (politician) (c. 1797–1860), Member of Parliament of the United Kingdom
