= George Balfour =

George Balfour may refer to:

- George Balfour (Conservative politician) (1872–1941), British Conservative Party politician and engineer
- George Balfour (Liberal politician) (1809–1894), British Army officer and Liberal politician
- George William Balfour (1823–1903), Scottish physician
