= George Bissell =

George Bissell is the name of:

- George Bissell (industrialist) (1821–1884), American oil businessman
- George Edwin Bissell (1839–1920), American sculptor
