= George Hagan =

George Hagan may refer to:

- George Elliott Hagan (1916–1990), American politician, businessman and farmer
- George Hagan (politician) (born 1938), Ghanaian politician
