= George Druce =

George Druce may refer to:

- George Claridge Druce (1850–1932), English botanist and mayor of Oxford
- George Druce (cricketer) (1821–1869), English barrister and cricketer
