= George Leech =

George Leech may refer to:

- George L. Leech (1890–1985), American prelate of the Roman Catholic Church, Bishop of Harrisburg 1935–1971
- George Leech (actor) (1921–2012), British actor and stunt performer
