= George Brennan =

George Brennan may refer to:

- George E. Brennan (1865–1928), Democratic party boss in Illinois
- George Brennan (boxer) (1911–unknown), English boxer
