= George Borwick =

George Borwick may refer to:

- George Borwick (umpire) (1896–1981), Australian cricket test match umpire
- George Borwick (politician) (1879–1964), British Conservative MP for Croydon North 1918–1922
