= George Mulholland =

George Mulholland may refer to:

- George Mulholland (footballer) (1928–2001), Scottish footballer
- George Mulholland (boxer) (1904–1971), American boxer
