= George Hemingway =

George Hemingway is the name of:

- George Hemingway (cricketer) (1872–1907), English cricketer
- George Hemingway (footballer) (1900–1975), Australian footballer
