= George Vest =

George Vest may refer to:

- George Graham Vest (1830–1904), American politician
- George S. Vest (1918–2021), American diplomat
- George Vest (coach) (1907–1997), American football and basketball coach
