= George Starr =

George Starr may refer to:

- George Reginald Starr (1904–1980), British mining engineer and agent of the Special Operations Executive (SOE)
- George E. Starr, late 19th century steamboat
- George Lothrop Starr (1878–1925), Dean of Ontario
