= George Moran =

George Moran may refer to:

- Bugs Moran (1892–1957), Chicago Prohibition-era gangster
- George Moran (comedian) (1881–1949), minstrel show performer and character actor in films, often as Native Americans
