= George Oakes =

George Oakes may refer to:

- George Oakes (journalist) (1861–1931), American journalist
- George Oakes (Australian politician) (1813–1881), Australian pastoralist and politician
- George Oakes (American politician) (1861–1937), American lawyer and politician in Wisconsin
