= George Chatterton =

George Chatterton may refer to:

- George Chatterton (politician) (1916–1983)
- George Chatterton (British Army officer) (1911–1987)
- George Chatterton (cricketer) (1821–1881)
