= George Hartley (cricketer, born 1849) =

English cricketer

George Hartley (17 March 1849 – 9 September 1909) was an English cricketer active from 1871 to 1872 who played for Lancashire. He was born in Heywood, Lancashire and died in Cheshire. He appeared in three first-class matches as a righthanded batsman, scoring 37 runs with a highest score of 24 and held two catches.
