= George Selden =

George Selden may refer to:

- George B. Selden (1846–1922), American inventor
- George Selden (author) (1929–1989), American children's writer

== See also ==
- George Seldes (1890–1995), American investigative journalist and media critic
