= George Beckwith =

George Beckwith may refer to:

- George Beckwith (British Army officer) (1753–1823), British officer and colonial governor
- George Beckwith (Carl Jung associate) (1896–1931), American who accompanied psychologist Carl Jung on his African expedition
