= George Drury =

George Drury may refer to:

- George Durie (1490s–1577), also spelt 'Dury' and 'Drury', Abbot of Dunfermline
- George Drury (footballer) (1914–1972), English professional footballer
- George Thorn-Drury (1860–1931), English barrister and literary scholar
