= George Needham =

George Needham may refer to:

- Sir George Needham (businessman) (1843–1928), English businessman and prominent citizen of Oldham
- George Needham (footballer) (1894–1967), English footballer
- George Needham (teacher) (1804–1894), Classics teacher in colonial South Australia
