= George Burling =

George Burling may refer to:

- George C. Burling (1834–1885), U.S. Union Army officer during the American Civil War
- George T. Burling (1849–1928), American banker and politician from New York

== See also ==
- George Beurling (1921–1948), Canadian fighter pilot
