= George Brimhall =

George Brimhall may refer to:

- George H. Brimhall (1852–1932), President of Brigham Young University
- George W. Brimhall (1814–1895), his father, politician in territorial Utah
