= George Herman =

George Herman may refer to:

- George Herman (journalist) (1920–2005), CBS journalist
- George Herman (playwright) (1928–2019), playwright and author

== See also ==
- George Herman Ruth (1895–1948), American baseball player
