= George P. Goodale =

Drama editor of The Detroit Free Press (1843–1919)

George Pomeroy Goodale
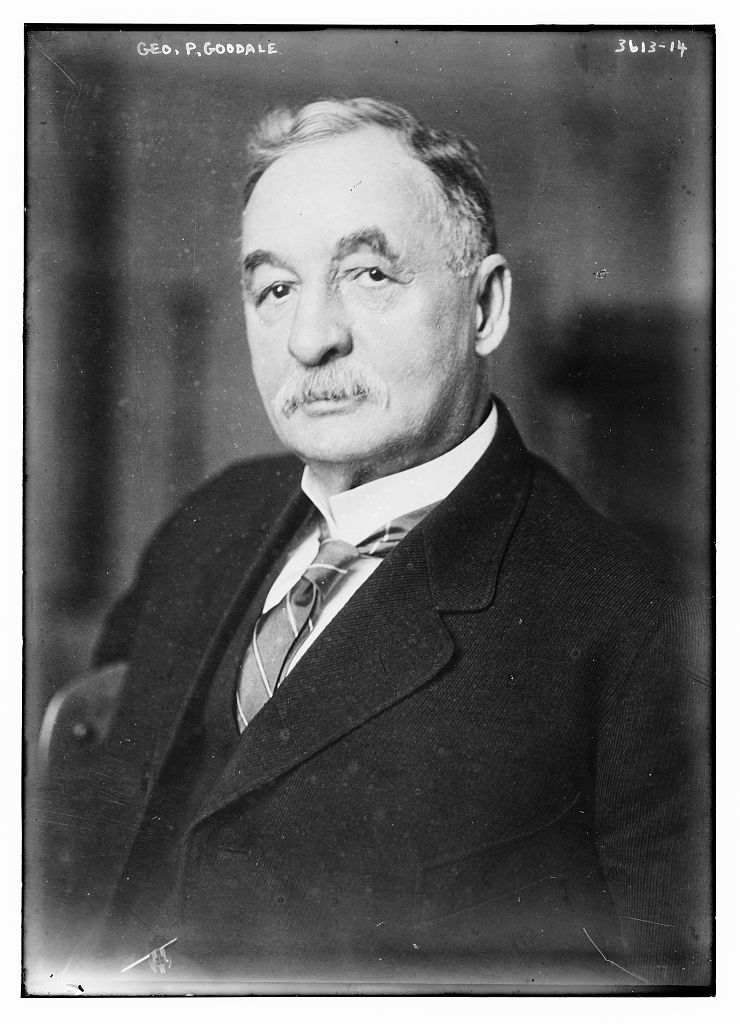
- Goodale circa 1915
- Born: April 12, 1843; Orleans, New York
- Died: May 12, 1919 (aged 76); Royal Oak Charter Township, Michigan
- Occupation: Drama editor of The Detroit Free Press

George Pomeroy Goodale (April 12, 1843 – May 7, 1919) was the drama editor of The Detroit Free Press.

== Biography ==
He was born on April 12, 1843, in Orleans, New York, to Elijah Goodale and Mary E. Palmer. He served in the American Civil War and became the drama editor of The Detroit Free Press in 1865.

He died on May 7, 1919, in Royal Oak Charter Township, Michigan.
