= George Tyson =

George Tyson may refer to:

- George Tyson (1900s rugby league) (died 1937), English rugby league footballer who played in the 1900s
- George Tyson (rugby league, born 1993), rugby league footballer for Sheffield Eagles
- George Tyson (film director) (1973–2014), Kenyan filmmaker
