= George Mountbatten =

George Mountbatten may refer to:

- George Mountbatten, 2nd Marquess of Milford Haven (1892–1938)
- George Mountbatten, 4th Marquess of Milford Haven (born 1961)
- Prince George of Wales (born 2013), grandson of King Charles III
