= George Stearns =

George Stearns may refer to:

- George Luther Stearns (1809–1867), abolitionist American industrialist and merchant
- George M. Stearns (1831–1894), American attorney
- George Stearns (politician) (1901–1979), Progressive Conservative party member of the Canadian House of Commons
- George N. Stearns (1812–1882), tool designer and founder of the George N. Stearns Company
