= George Passmore =

George Passmore may refer to:

- George Passmore (artist) (born 1942), English artist, one half of the duo Gilbert & George
- George Passmore (cricketer) (1852–1935), English cricketer
- George Passmore (lacrosse) (1889–1952), American lacrosse player
