= George Darrow =

George Darrow may refer to:

- George P. Darrow (1859–1943), U.S. Representative from Pennsylvania
- George M. Darrow (1889–1983), American horticulturist, strawberry expert
- George Darrow (baseball) (1903–1983), pitcher for the Philadelphia Phillies
