= George Lascelles =

George Lascelles may refer to:

- George Lascelles, 7th Earl of Harewood (1923–2011), British aristocrat, magazine editor and arts administrator, first cousin of Queen Elizabeth II
- George Lascelles (MP), MP for Nottinghamshire in 1553
