= George Wang =

George Wang may refer to:

- George Wang (actor) (1918–2015), Taiwanese actor and producer
- George Wang (producer), American film and television producer
