= George Bartley =

George Bartley may refer to:

- George Trout Bartley (1842–1910), English civil servant
- George Bartley (comedian) (1782–1858), English stage comedian
- George Bartley (editor), American ophthalmologist and journal editor
