= George Rochfort =

George Rochfort may refer to:

- George Rochfort (politician) (1682–1730), Anglo-Irish politician
- George Rochfort, 2nd Earl of Belvedere (1738–1814), Anglo-Irish politician and peer
- George Boyd-Rochfort (1880–1940), Irish recipient of the Victoria Cross
