= George Lundberg =

George Lundberg may refer to:

- George A. Lundberg (1895–1966), American sociologist
- George D. Lundberg (born 1933), American physician
- George G. Lundberg (1892–1981), Brigadier-General in the United States
