= George Hadley (disambiguation) =

George Hadley (1685–1768) was an English meteorologist.

George Hadley may also refer to:

- George Hadley (footballer) (1889–1954), Scottish footballer
- George Hadley (orientalist) (died 1798), East India Company officer
- George Dickinson Hadley (1908–1984), English gastroenterologist
