= George Dodington =

George Dodington may refer to:

- George Dodington (died 1720) (c. 1662–1720), English Whig politician.
- George Dodington, 1st Baron Melcombe (1691–1762), English politician
- George Dodington (died 1757) (1681–1757), English MP
