= George Wickens =

George Wickens is the name of:

- George Wickens (Australian footballer) (1878–1950), Australian rules footballer
- George Wickens (English footballer) (born 2001), English footballer
- George Michael Wickens (1918–2006), academic of Persian and Iranian history
