= George Hinman =

George Hinman may refer to:

- George Wheeler Hinman (1864–1927), American writer and newspaper publisher
- George E. Hinman (1870–1961), American lawyer and politician from the state of Connecticut
