= George McGowan (disambiguation) =

George McGowan is a Canadian football player.

George McGowan may also refer to:

- George McGowan (Scottish footballer) (1943–2009), Scottish football (soccer) player (Chester City)
- George McGowan (rugby league) (1891–1970), rugby league footballer in the New South Wales Rugby League
