= George Economou =

George Economou may refer to:

- George Economou (scientist) (1923–2003), American optical systems expert, who worked on the development of the first atomic bomb
- George Economou (poet) (1934–2019), American poet and translator
- George Economou (shipbuilder) (born 1953), Greek billionaire shipowner
