= George Baer =

George Baer may refer to:

- George Baer Jr. (1763–1834), United States Representative from Maryland
- George Frederick Baer (1842–1914), American lawyer and railroad president
- George A. Baer (1903–1994), German/Swiss/American bookbinder
