= George Boleyn (disambiguation) =

George Boleyn, Viscount Rochford (c.1504–1536) was an English courtier, the brother of Ann Boleyn.

George Boleyn may also refer to:

- George Boleyn (priest) (died 1603), Dean of Lichfield
- George Boleyn (The Tudors), character of 2nd Viscount Rochford in the TV series The Tudors
