= George Longman =

George Longman may refer to:

- George Longman (cricketer) (1852–1938), English cricketer
- George Longman (MP) (1776–1822)

== See also ==
- Longman family tree, showing the relationship between the above
