= George Yule =

George Yule may refer to:

- George Yule (businessman) (1829–1892), Scottish merchant and politician in India
- George Yule (linguist) (born 1947), British linguist
- George Udny Yule (1871–1951), British statistician
