= George Huang =

George Huang may refer to:

- George Huang (director), film director
- George Huang (Law & Order: Special Victims Unit), a character on Law & Order
- George Huang (businessman), an Acer Inc. founder
- George Huang (politician) (1935–2022), Taiwanese politician
