= George Roosevelt =

George Roosevelt may refer to:

- George Emlen Roosevelt (1887–1963), banker and philanthropist
- George W. Roosevelt (1843–1907), Medal of Honor recipient
