= George Napier (disambiguation) =

George Napier (1751–1804) was a British Army officer.

George Napier may also refer to:

- George Thomas Napier (1784–1855), George Napier's son, also a British Army officer, Governor of the Cape
- George Napper (1550–1610) or Napier, English Roman Catholic priest and martyr
- George M. Napier (1863–1932), Attorney General of Georgia
