= George Chadwick =

George Chadwick may refer to:

- George Whitefield Chadwick (1854–1931), American composer
- George B. Chadwick (1880–1961), All-American football player and coach
- George Chadwick (bishop) (1840–1923), Irish bishop
