= George Bentinck =

George Bentinck may refer to:

- Lord George Bentinck (1802–1848), English Conservative politician and racehorse owner, MP for King's Lynn
- George Bentinck (Norfolk MP) (1803–1886), British Conservative politician, Member of Parliament for Norfolk West
- George Cavendish-Bentinck (1821–1891), British Conservative politician, barrister, and cricketer
- Lord George Bentinck (British Army officer) (1715–1759), Member of Parliament for Grampound and Malmesbury
