= George Brand =

George Brand may refer to:

- George Brand (convict) (1820–1872), convict transported to Western Australia
- George Brand (politician) (1911–1997), Australian politician
