= George London =

George London may refer to:

- George London (bass-baritone) (1920–1985), American operatic bass-baritone
- George London (landscape architect) (died 1714), English nurseryman and garden designer
- George London (colonial administrator) (1889–1957), British colonial administrator
- George G. London, U.S. Air Force test pilot
