= George Stocking =

George Stocking may refer to:

- George W. Stocking Sr. (1892–1975), American economist
- George W. Stocking Jr. (1928–2013), American anthropologist
