= George Kunkel =

George Kunkel may refer to:

- George Kunkel (actor, born 1866) (1866–1937), American actor and operatic baritone, son of the theatre manager
- George Kunkel (politician) (1893–1965), American politician
- George Kunkel (theatre manager) (1823-1885), American theatre manager, actor, singer, playwright, blackface minstrel, and composer
