= George Chichester =

George Chichester may refer to:

- George Chichester, 2nd Marquess of Donegall (1769–1844), Irish nobleman and politician
- George Chichester, 3rd Marquess of Donegall (1797–1883), Anglo-Irish landowner, courtier and politician
- George Chichester, 5th Marquess of Donegall (1822–1904), Anglo-Irish soldier and company promoter
