= George Brewster =

George Brewster may refer to:

- Dod Brewster (1891–1964), Scottish football centre-half
- George Brewster (sculptor) (1862–1943), American sculptor and architectural sculptor
- George Brewster (1864–1875), whose death led to the Chimney Sweepers Act 1875
