= George Abbey =

George Abbey may refer to:

- George Abbey (NASA) (1932–2024), American director of the Johnson Space Center in Houston
- George Abbey (footballer) (born 1978), Nigerian footballer.

== See also ==
- George Abbe (1911–1989), American writer
