= George Olmsted =

George Olmsted may refer to:

- George H. Olmsted (1901–1998), American military officer and insurance executive
- George W. Olmsted (1874–1940), founded the Long Island Lighting Company in 1911
