= George Coghill =

George Coghill may refer to:

- George E. Coghill (1872–1941), American anatomist
- George Coghill (American football) (born 1970), American football player
