= George Grinnell =

George Grinnell may refer to:

- George Bird Grinnell (1849–1938), American anthropologist, naturalist, and writer
- George Blake Grinnell (1823–1891), American merchant and financier
- George Grennell Jr. (1786–1877), U.S. Congressman from Massachusetts
