= George Parr =

George Parr may refer to:

- George Parr (cricketer) (1826–1891), English cricketer
- George Berham Parr (1901–1975), political figure in the USA
- George Parr, a generic name for many characters in improvised dialogue by John Bird and John Fortune on TV show Bremner, Bird and Fortune
