= George Hepburn =

George Hepburn may refer to:

- George Hepburn (bishop) (died 1513), son of Adam Hepburn and brother to Patrick Hepburn, the first Earl of Bothwell
- George Hepburn (politician) (1803–1883), 19th century Member of Parliament from Otago, New Zealand
