= George Gomori =

George Gomori may refer to:

- György Gömöri (1904–1957), Hungarian-American physician and histochemist
- George Gomori (born 1934), Hungarian-born poet, writer and academic
