= George Woodbridge =

George Woodbridge may refer to:

- George Woodbridge (actor) (1907–1973), English actor
- George Woodbridge (illustrator) (1930–2004), American illustrator
