= George Beckley =

George Beckley may refer to:

- George Charles Beckley (1787–1826), an English sea captain who became an advisor to Kamehameha I
- George Charles Moʻoheau Beckley (1849–1910), Hawaiian seafarer, grandson of George Charles Beckley and director of the Wilder Steamship Company
- George Healii Kahea Beckley (1886–1921), Hawaiian soldier who served in the British Army during World War I, great-grandson of George Charles Beckley
