= George Denny =

George Denny may refer to:

- George V. Denny Jr. (1899–1959), American radio personality
- George H. Denny (1870–1955), American academic and university president
