= George Eustis =

George Eustis may refer to:

- George Eustis Jr. (1828–1872), American lawyer and politician
- George Eustis Sr. (1796–1858), his father, chief justice of the Louisiana Supreme Court
