= George Bulman =

George Bulman may refer to:

- George Bulman (fictional character), a British police detective of novels and a TV series
- George Bulman (pilot) (1896–1963), chief test pilot for Hawker Aircraft
