= George Mickelson =

George Mickelson could refer to:

- George T. Mickelson (1903–1965), American judge and governor of South Dakota
- George S. Mickelson (1941–1993), his son, governor of South Dakota
