= George Catlin (disambiguation) =

George Catlin (1796–1872) was an American painter noted for portraits of Native Americans.

George Catlin may also refer to:

- George Catlin (musical instrument maker) (1778–1852), American maker of woodwind instruments
- George S. Catlin (1808–1851), U.S. Representative from Connecticut
- Sir George Catlin (political scientist) (1896–1979), English political scientist and philosopher
