= George Pope =

George Pope may refer to:

- George Pope (cricketer) (1911–1993), English cricketer
- George Uglow Pope (1820–1908), Christian missionary
- George D. Pope (1867–1927), political figure on Prince Edward Island
