= George Crane =

George Crane may refer to:

- George Levi Crane (1891–1952), American-born doctor and political figure in Saskatchewan
- George W. Crane (1901–1995), psychologist, physician and syndicated newspaper columnist
