= George Agar =

George Agar may refer to:

- George Agar, 1st Baron Callan (1751–1815), Irish politician
- George Agar-Ellis, 1st Baron Dover (1797–1833), British politician and man of letters
- George Agar (rugby league) (1902–1966), Australian rugby league player
