= George Whaley =

George Whaley may refer to:

- George Whaley (politician), unionist politician in Northern Ireland
- George Whaley (actor), Australian actor, director and writer
