= George Daniell =

George Daniell may refer to:

- George Daniell (priest) (1853–1931), English Anglican priest
- George Daniell (anaesthestist) (1864–1937), medical practitioner and anaesthesiologist
- George Daniell (photographer) (1911–2002), American photographer
