= George Bryson =

George Bryson may refer to:

- George Bryson Sr. (1813–1900), member of the Legislative Assembly of Quebec
- George Bryson Jr. (1852–1937), member of the Legislative Council of Quebec, son of the above
