= George Scrimshaw =

George Scrimshaw may refer to:

- George Scrimshaw (cricketer) (born 1998), English cricketer
- George Scrimshaw (rugby union) (1902–1971), New Zealand rugby union player
