= Great Western Railway wagons =

Fleet of railway rolling stock

Great Western Railway
- Logo of the Great Western Railway, incorporating the shields, crests and mottoes of the cities of London (left) and Bristol (right)

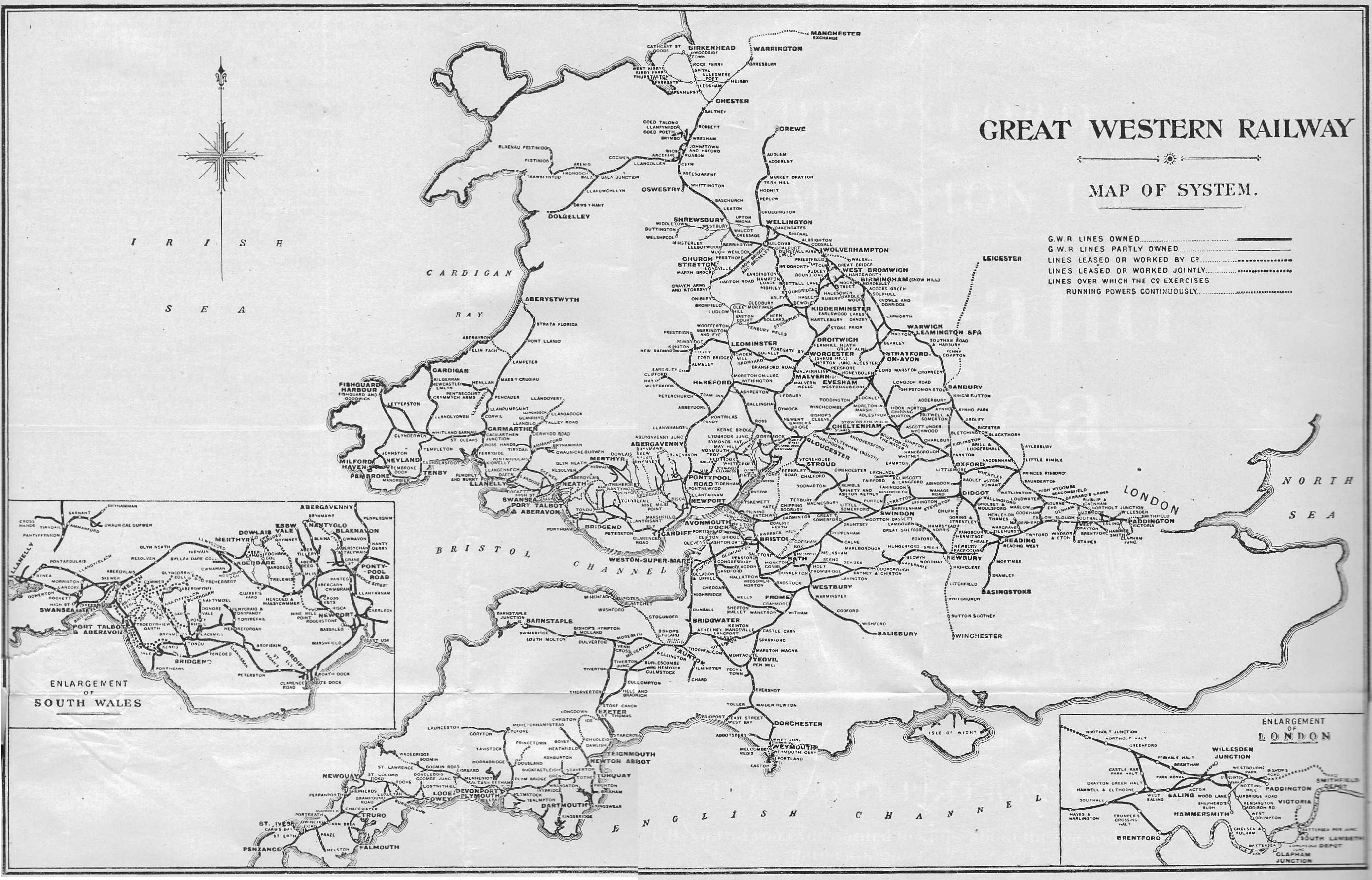
- Map of the railway pre-grouping (1920)

- Map of the railway post-grouping (1926)

History
- 1835: Act of incorporation
- 1838: First train ran
- 1869–92: 7 ft 1/4 in (2,140 mm) Brunel gauge changed to 4 ft 8 1/2 in (1,435 mm) standard gauge
- 1903: Start of road motor services
- 1923: Keeps identity though the Grouping
- 1935: Centenary
- 1948: Nationalised

Successor organisation
- 1948: British Rail, Western Region
Constituent companies
See full list of constituents of the GWR
1854	Shrewsbury and Birmingham Railway; Shrewsbury and Chester Railway
1862	South Wales Railway
1863	West Midland Railway
1876	Bristol and Exeter Railway; South Devon Railway
1889	Cornwall Railway
1922	Rhymney Railway; Taff Vale Railway; Cambrian Railways
1923	Midland & S W Junction Railway

Key locations
- Headquarters: Paddington station, London
- Locale: England; Wales
- Workshops: Swindon; Wolverhampton
- Major stations: Birmingham Snow Hill; Bristol Temple Meads; Cardiff General; London Paddington; Reading General
Route mileage
Mileage shown as at end of year stated
1841	171 miles (275 km)
1863	1,106 miles (1,780 km)
1876	2,023 miles (3,256 km)
1899	2,504 miles (4,030 km)
1919	2,996 miles 68 chains (4,823.0 km)
1921	3,005 miles (4,836 km)
1924	3,797 miles (6,111 km)
1925	3,819 miles 69 chains (6,147.5 km)

The fleet of Great Western Railway wagons was both large and varied as it carried the wide variety of goods traffic on the Great Western Railway (GWR) in the United Kingdom. This was the railway company that operated for the longest period of time in the country (from 1838 to 1947) and covered a large geographical area that included big cities such as London, industrialised areas including the West Midlands, areas of coal and mineral mining such as South Wales, and Somerset and other important agricultural districts. In 1902 the company owned 59,036 wagons, and by 1926 this had risen to 88,580.

The first wagons were just open boxes but covered vans were added from the 1860s and a wide range of special wagons were eventually built to handle many specialised traffics. Towards the end of its existence these were all painted in a grey livery, but before that both black and red had been used at different times.

== Design development ==
Most early vehicles were open wagons with four wheels, although a few six-wheeled vehicles were provided for special loads. Covered vans followed, initially for carrying cattle but later for any kind of goods that needed to be protected from the weather during transit. The first bogie wagons appeared in 1873 for heavy loads, but bogie coal wagons were built in 1904 following on from the large four-wheeled coal wagons that had first appeared in 1898. Rated at 20 long tons (22.4 short tons; 20.3 t), these had been twice the size of typical wagons of the period, but it was not until 1923 that the company invested heavily in coal wagons of this size and the infrastructure necessary for unloading them at the railway-owned docks; these were known as "Felix Pole" wagons after the GWR's General Manager who promoted their use. Container wagons appeared in 1931 and special motor car vans in 1933. Indeed, special wagons were built for many different commodities such as gunpowder, china clay, motor cars, boilers, long girders, sheets of glass, cattle, fruit and fish.

When the GWR was opened no trains were fitted with vacuum brakes, instead handbrakes were fitted to individual wagons and trains conveyed brake vans where guards had control of screw-operated brakes. The first goods wagons to be fitted with vacuum brakes were those that ran in passenger trains carrying perishable goods such as fish. Some ballast hoppers were given vacuum brakes in December 1903, and some general goods wagons were constructed with them from 1904 onwards, although unfitted wagons (those without vacuum brakes) still formed the majority of the fleet on 1 January 1948 when the railway was nationalised to become a part of British Railways.

In common with most other British railways, goods trains were coupled together by a large three-link chain between sprung hooks on each wagon. Some vacuum-braked wagons were fitted with screw couplings which could be tightened so that wagons did not bounce back and forwards on their buffers, in which the middle link of the coupling was a threaded bar with a handle to rotate it. More common on GWR wagons was an instanter coupling, in which the middle link was specially shaped so that they could be shortened when in vacuum-fitted trains.

== Livery ==
Wagons were painted brown in the early years of the GWR, but this changed to red before the end of the broad gauge in 1892. A dark grey livery was introduced about 1904 and continued to be used until 1947.

The owner of the wagon was identified by 'G.W.R' painted in small letters on the underframe or bottom plank of the body. When wagons were painted red many were fitted with cast iron plates instead. From 1904 the initials changed to a large (25 in or 64 cm) painted 'GW' which was reduced to just 16 in (41 cm) in 1920. About 1937 the design returned to just a small 5 in (13 cm) 'GW' painted just above the wagon's number.

== Types of wagons ==
=== Opens ===
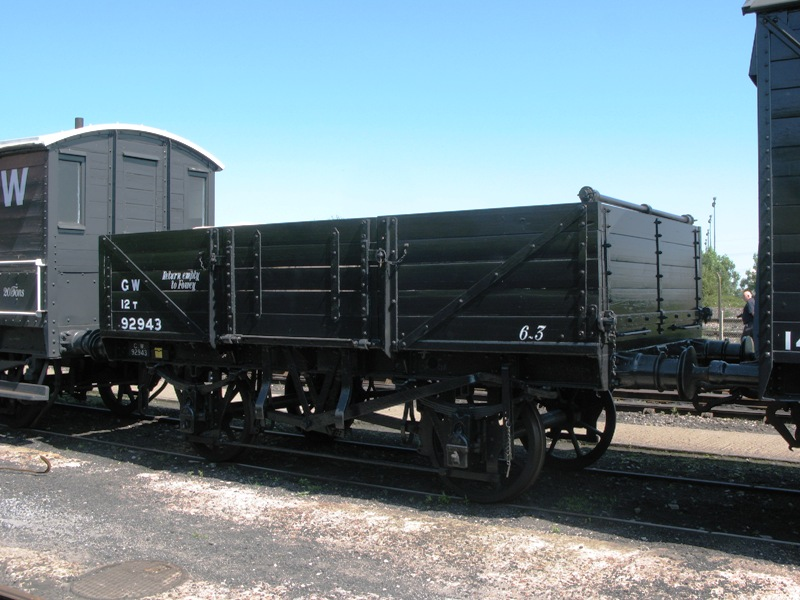
Diagram O13 open with end doors

The earliest wagons were of an open type, essentially a four-sided box with a drop-down door in each side carried on four or sometimes six wheels. Those with just one or two side planks and an 8 ton capacity were built until 1872 by which time 9 ton, four-wheel, three-plank wagons were being constructed. 1886 saw the introduction of four-plank wagons which were rated to carry 10 tons but a few longer ones (18 feet (5.5 m) instead of the usual 16 feet (4.9 m)) were rated at 12 tons. Five-plank wagons were standard construction from 1902 but from just two years later all new open wagons were built with seven planks.

Many early wagons were built with semi-circular raised ends that could support a tarpaulin cover or 'tilt'. From 1902 a number of open wagons were instead constructed with a longitudinal bar above the middle of the wagon and fixed to a pivot at each end. This was able to support a tarpaulin, or 'sheet' as they were by now known.

An experimental bogie open, coded 'Tourn', was built in 1889. 36 feet (11 m) long, it was two-planks high but soon raised to four planks and rated to carry 25 tons. From 1925 the standard wagon length for four-wheeled wagons was increased to 17.5 feet (5.3 m) to meet Railway Clearing House standards. A number of longer wagons were constructed for special traffics such as metal tubes or lengths of timber and given the telegraphic code 'Tube C'. The first of these, built in 1907, were 25 feet (7.6 m) long and rated at 14 tons; from 1945 they were 30 feet (9.1 m) long and could carry 21 tons.

Specific wagons were built for special traffics, including diagrams O12 and O13 with end doors that allowed china clay to be unloaded into ships by tipping the whole wagon. Diagram O25 were built with hopper discharge in the floor for grain traffic, while O27 had strengthened underframes for their heavy tinplate traffic. Diagrams N23, N24, N31 and N32 were large 20 ton iron opens built for coal traffic, many of which were hired to specific collieries or coal merchants at cheap rates as these were more efficient for the railway to haul than the 12 ton wooden vehicles that these businesses generally owned and operated themselves at the time.

'Tadpole' wagons were long open wagons that could be operated at passenger train speeds to carry fish. Some of these were rebuilt on former 7 ft (2,134 mm) broad gauge coach chassis.

=== Vans ===
Early wagons were always open at the top, but from the 1860s covered vans were built in ever increasing numbers. These 'Mink' vans were initially constructed from wood, but between 1886 and 1902 iron was used instead and more than 4,000 such vehicles were built. Most were rated at 9 or 10 tons, but some 36 feet (11 m) bogie vans rated at 30 tons were also built in 1902 and 1911. These were identified by the 'Mink F' telegraphic code.

Construction of wooden-bodied vans resumed in 1902, but unlike the vans with wooden body frames of forty years earlier, these were built using iron angle section frames. Standard 'Minks' built in 1902 were 16 feet (4.9 m) long and 7 feet (2.1 m) high inside. The height was increased on new vans built during the next few years, first by a little over 6 inches (15 cm), then again to just over 8 feet (2.4 m), but it eventually settled on the middle height. Ventilators which could be closed by shutters were fitted in some vans (code 'Mink A') but these later became hooded vents. Up until 1921 four-wheeled vans were generally rated at 10 tons, but improvements then allowed this to be increased to 12 tons.

From 1927 vans were built to a 17.5 feet (5.3 m) length. Larger vans continued to be produced, first of all 21 feet (6.4 m) long ('Mink B', or 'Mink C' with ventilators), and then 28.5 feet (8.7 m) ('Mink D' with ventilators). These were only rated at 10 tons, but in 1931 30 feet (9.1 m) long 20 ton vans were built ('Mink G').

Vans for special loads included shock-absorbing vans with the body anchored to the underframe by springs (diagrams V27 and V28) and grain hoppers (V20). Perishable traffic was carried in 'Mica' ventilated (X1) and 'Mica A' or 'Mica B' refrigerated (X2 etc.) meat vans, 'Bloater' fish vans (S6 etc.), or fruit vans with extra ventilation (although banana vans were fitted with heating equipment to help ripen their loads). Motor cars were loaded through doors in the ends of 'Asmo', 'Damo' and 'Mogo' vans (G24-G32, G43), also the bogie 'Bocar' (G33-G38, G44, G45).

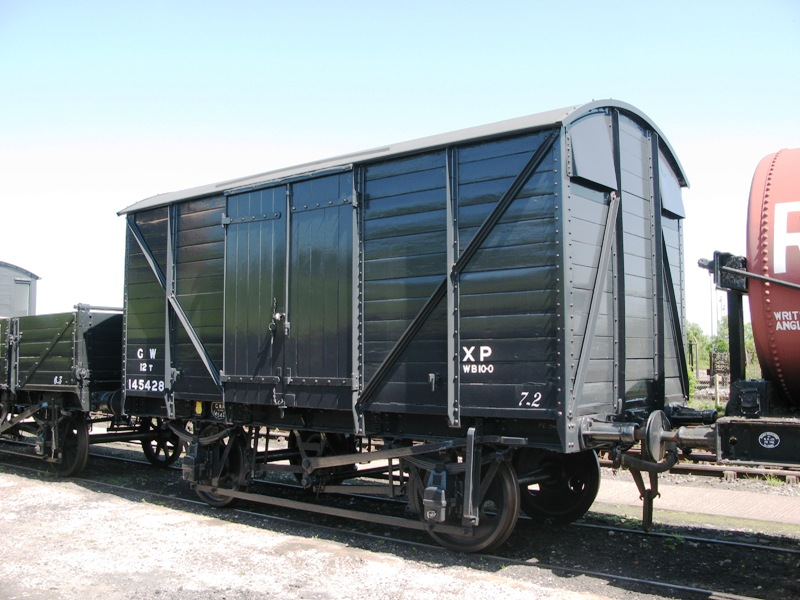
Diagram V34 Mink

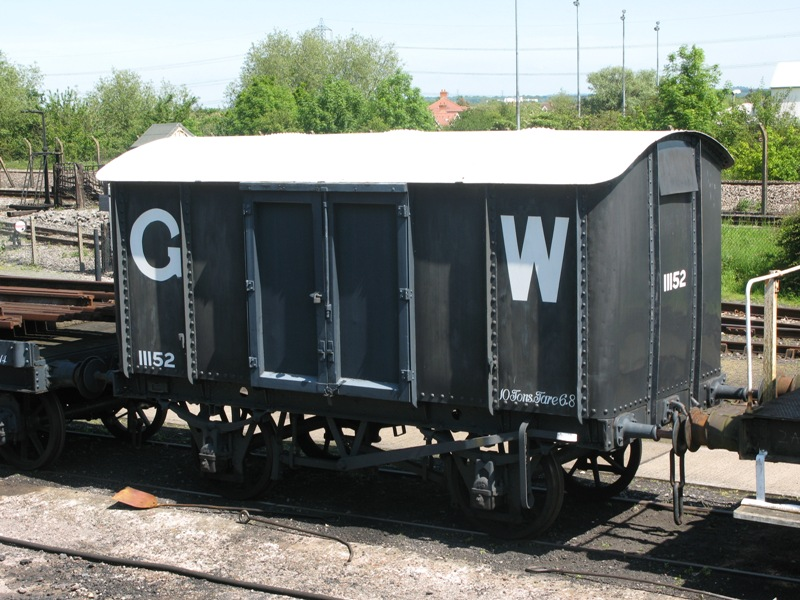
Diagram V6 iron bodied Mink

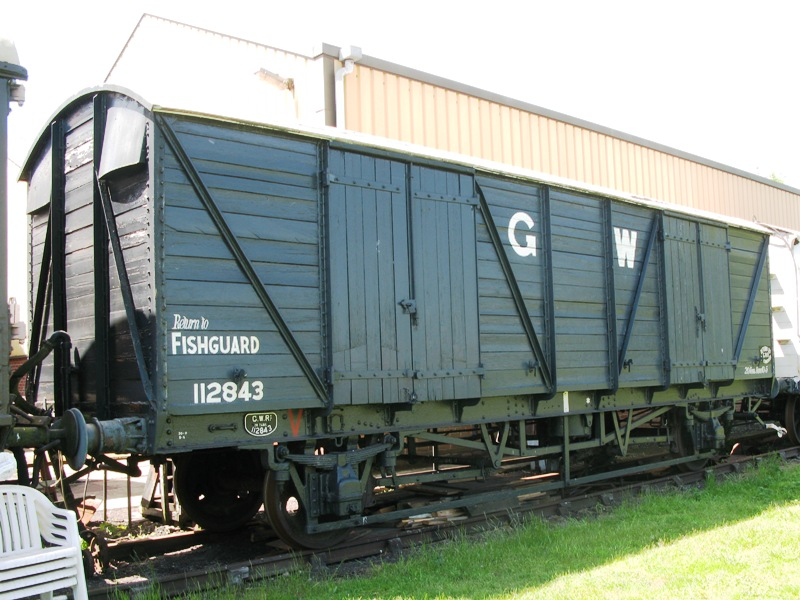
Diagram V22 Mink G

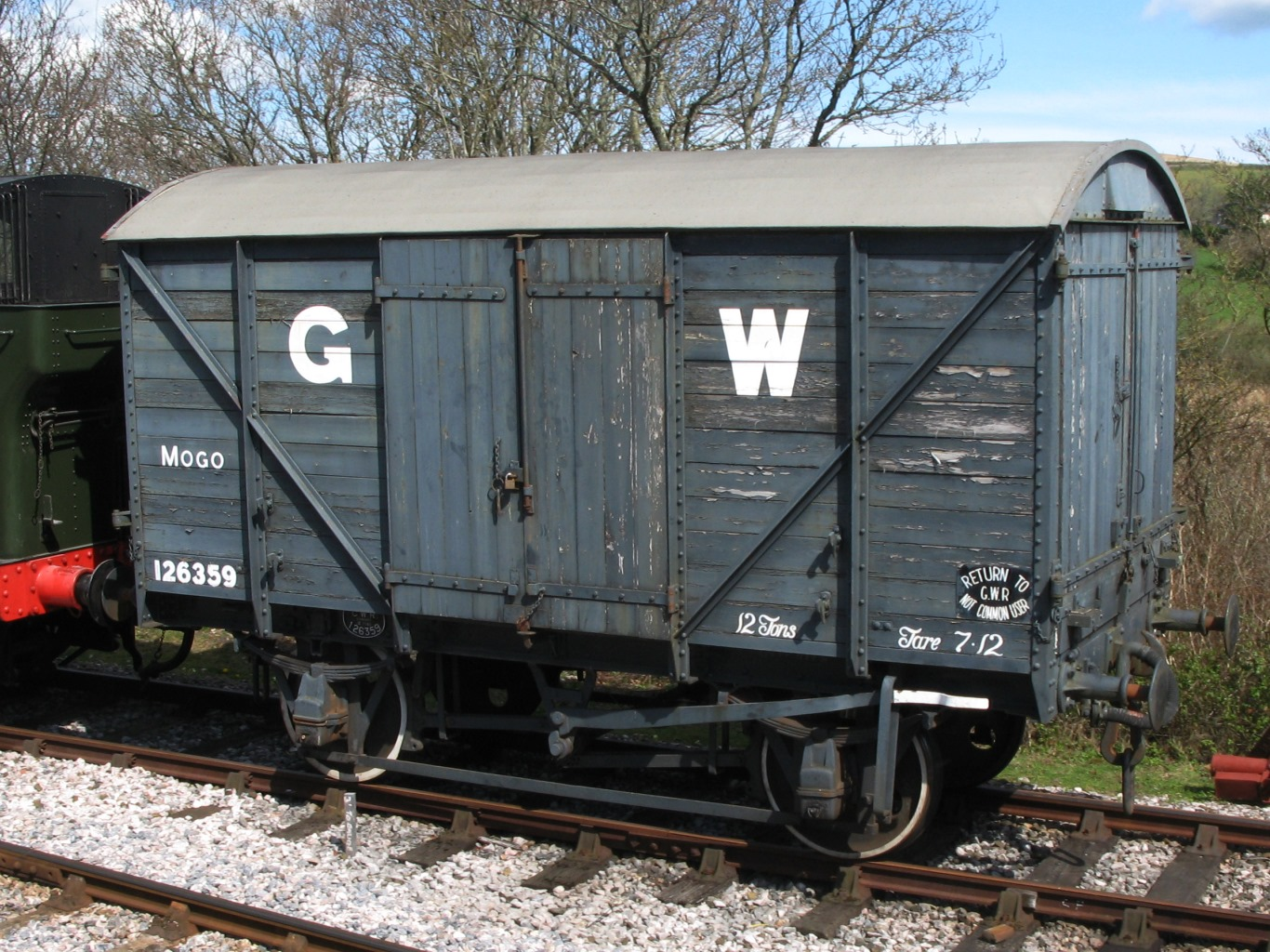
Diagram G31 Mogo for cars

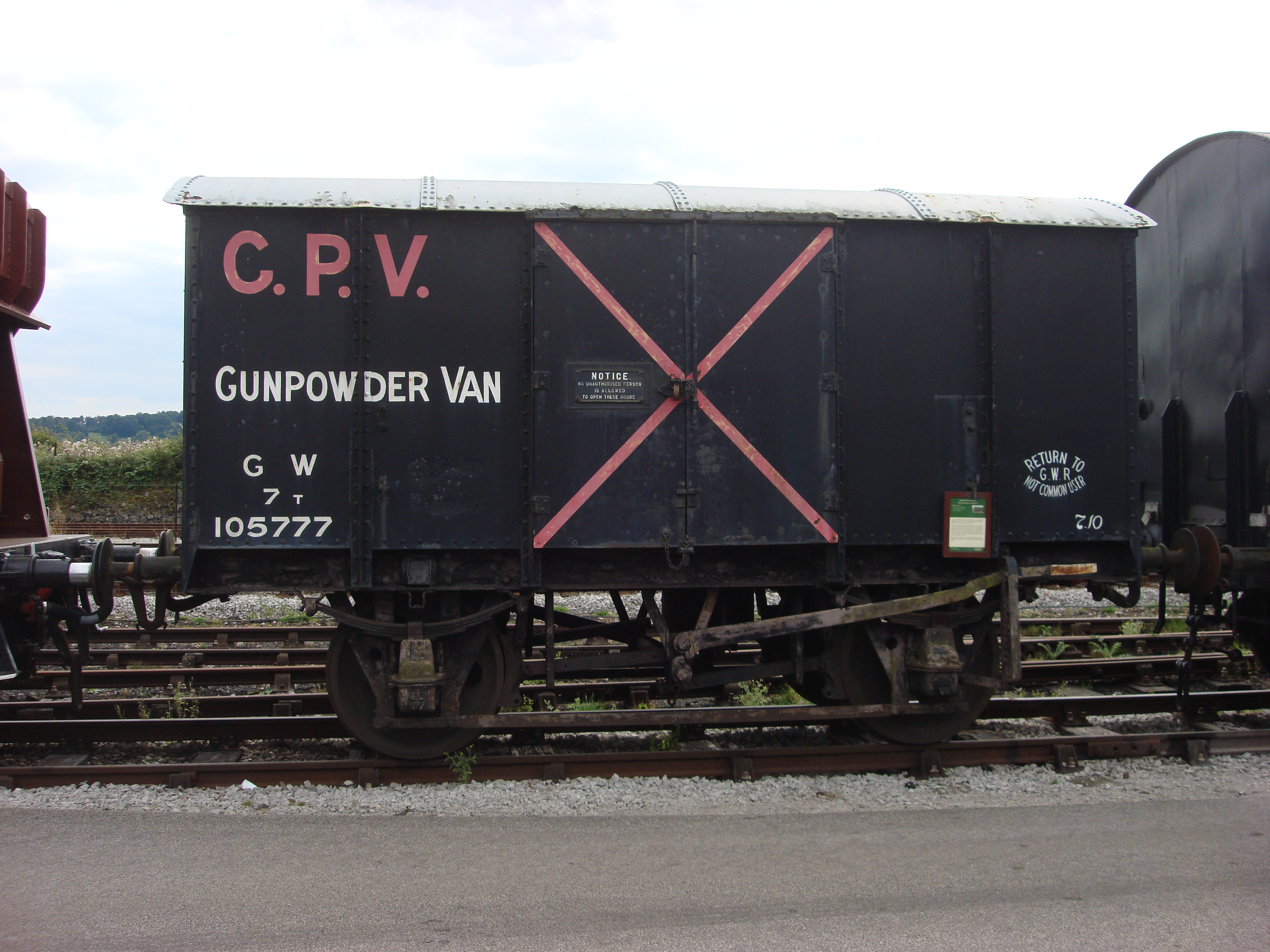
Diagram Z4 Cone for gunpowder

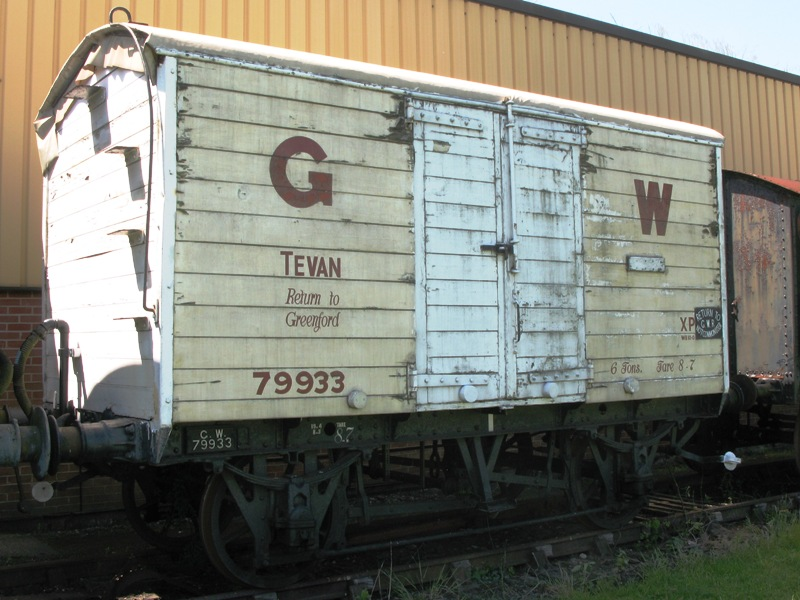
Diagram X7 Tevan for perishables

=== Milk trains ===
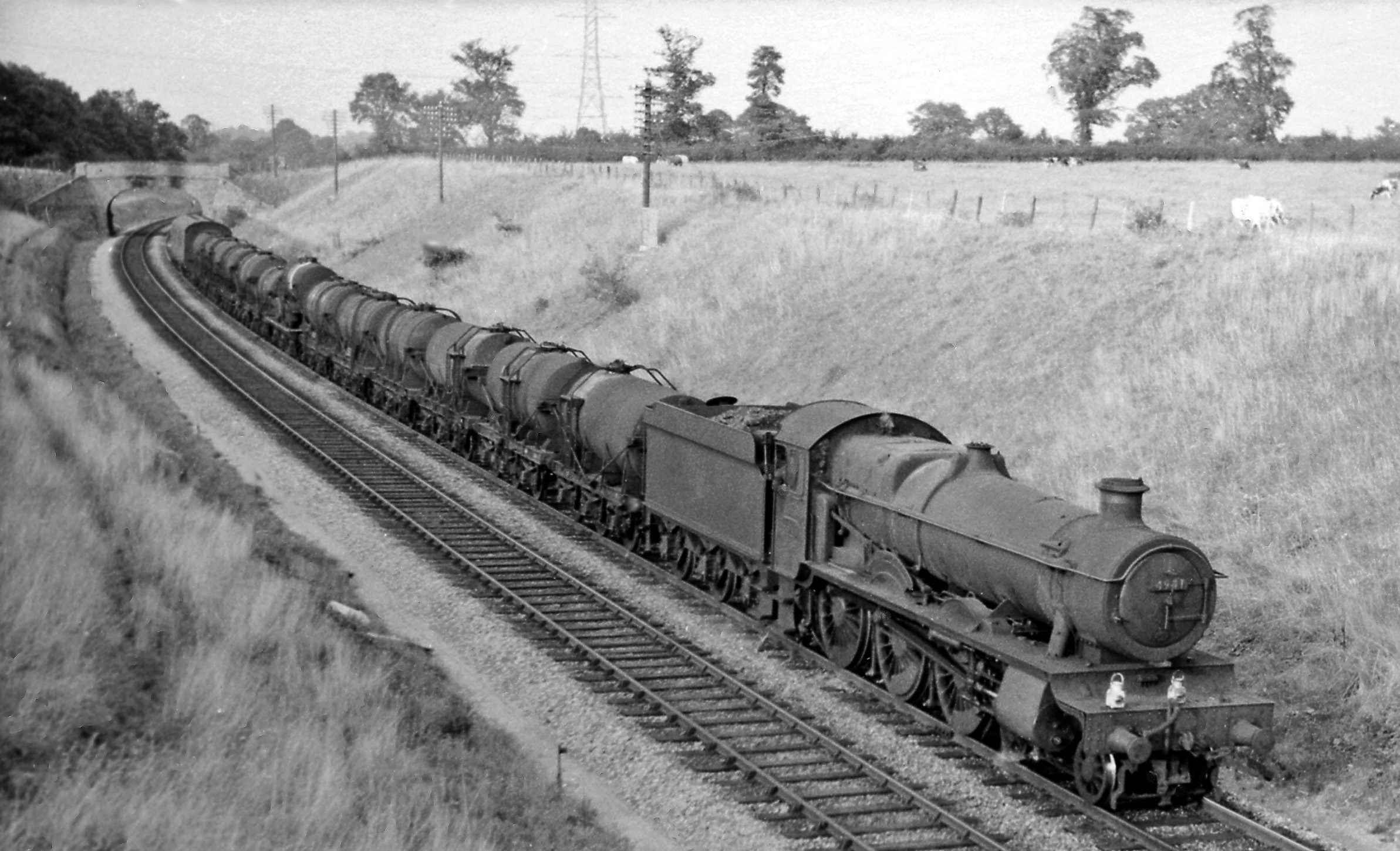
GWR Hall Class 4-6-0 No. 4941 Llangedwyn Hall hauls an empty train of 13 Milk tank wagons and one Siphon G past Frome, Somerset on the Reading to Taunton line, on return run from the former Express Dairies depot in Kensington, London to Plymouth, Devon

Post grouping in 1923, of the 282,000,000 imperial gallons (339,000,000 US gal; 1.28×10^{9} L) of milk transported by rail by all four national railways companies, the GWR had the largest share of milk traffic, serving the rural and highly agricultural West of England and South Wales. From the 1880s, the milk was delivered direct from the farmer to the local railway station in milk churns. So to remove the need for moving unprocessed milk from one container to another, and hence potential cross contamination or need to install hygienic washing facilities, the decision was taken to transport the milk churns. From the 1880s, the GWR had introduced the GWR Siphon series of passenger carriage chassis-based high-speed and ventilated enclosed wagons, but with volumes rising and production systems changing, the transport system had to change. Introduced from 1926, milk tank wagons were initially built on two-axle GWR chassis, and from 1936 on three-axle. The glass-lined tank which carried the milk was supplied and owned by the dairy firm. Typically weighing 25 long tons (25,000 kg) when loaded with 3,000 imperial gallons (3,603 US gal; 13,638 L) of milk product, it resulted in a wagon that was as heavy as an express passenger coach. Formed into specialised milk trains, to reduce time delays to market they were hauled by topline express locomotives, including Kings, Castles and Halls, unlike the similarly heavy coal trains.

=== Flat and well wagons ===
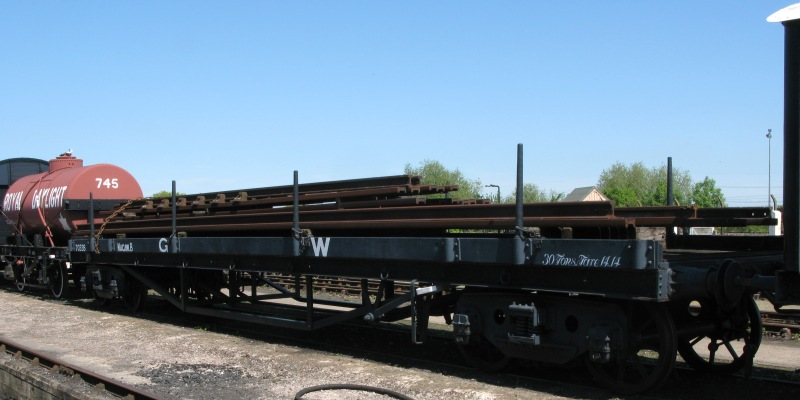
Diagram J28 Macaw B

There were a large number of different types of wagons for carrying large loads, but many were only built in small numbers, each given a telegraphic code with an additional letter to distinguish the particular dimensions of the wagon concerned. 'Beavers' were flat wagons, including many six-wheeled types and the bogie version known as a 'Beaver D'. From 1931 specialised flat wagons known as 'Conflats' were built with special fittings to carry containerised goods. These were all in the H-series of diagrams.

The J-series was for bolster wagons, which means that loads were carried on raised wooden baulks or 'bolsters' and generally had movable stakes at either end of each bolster to prevent loads sliding off the side of the wagon. Most of these were given 'Macaw' telegraphic codes but there were also a few given 'Beaver' or 'Gane' names. For example, 45 feet (14 m), 30 ton bogie vehicles were coded 'Macaw B' but 62 feet (19 m) vehicles rated at 40 tons to carry rails for the company's use were coded 'Gane A'. 'Mite's were permanently coupled pairs of single bolster wagons on diagram J9.

Well wagons were provided which had a lower floor between the wheels to increase the available load height.'Crocodiles' were boiler trucks (later known as trolleys) with diagram numbers in the C series if loads had to be lifted in by crane, or F if a slope allowed loads such as steamrollers to be driven into the well of the body. Similar but more lightly constructed vehicles for carrying ordinary carts, lorries and motor cars were coded 'Loriot' or 'Serpent'. Well wagons with angled trestles for carrying wide, flat loads were known as 'Hydra'.

=== Specialised wagons ===
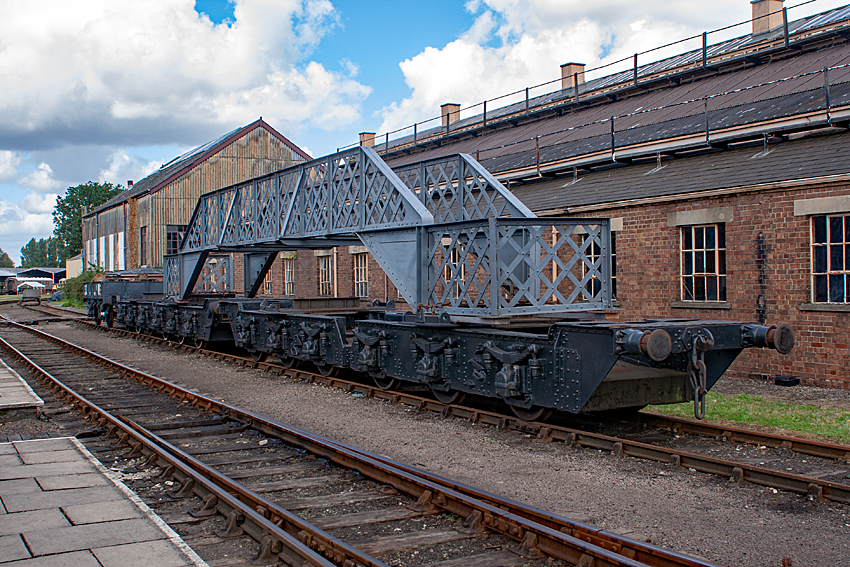
Diagram A10 4 Pollen Es demonstrating their long load capability

The railway needed a number of specialised vehicles to carry traffic that could not be easily or safely carried by the standard open, covered or flat wagons. These included strong wagons for metal ingots, etc. ('Totems', diagram B1 etc.); special well wagons for glass sheets ('Coral', D1 and D2) and propellers ('Morel' and 'Aero', E1 etc.). 'Pollens' (A1 etc.) were low single-ended wagons for exceptionally long items such as boilers and girders; they worked in pairs but some could be uncoupled and then one attached to each end of an exceptionally long load, similar to a Schnabel car.

Cattle wagons had a large gap between the top of the sides and the roof, but the ends were similar to vans in that they went right up to the roof. These were for a while built as 'small', 'medium' or 'large' sizes. Later construction was all to the large size but with a moveable partition that could reduce the capacity if that was what a farmer required; if cattle were left with too much space they would hurt themselves if they fell over when the train was in motion. Cattle wagons were given the telegraphic code 'Mex' for ordinary beasts and 'Beetle' for pedigree cattle that needed to be accompanied by a drover, and could be found in diagrams W1 to W14.

=== Railway service vehicles ===
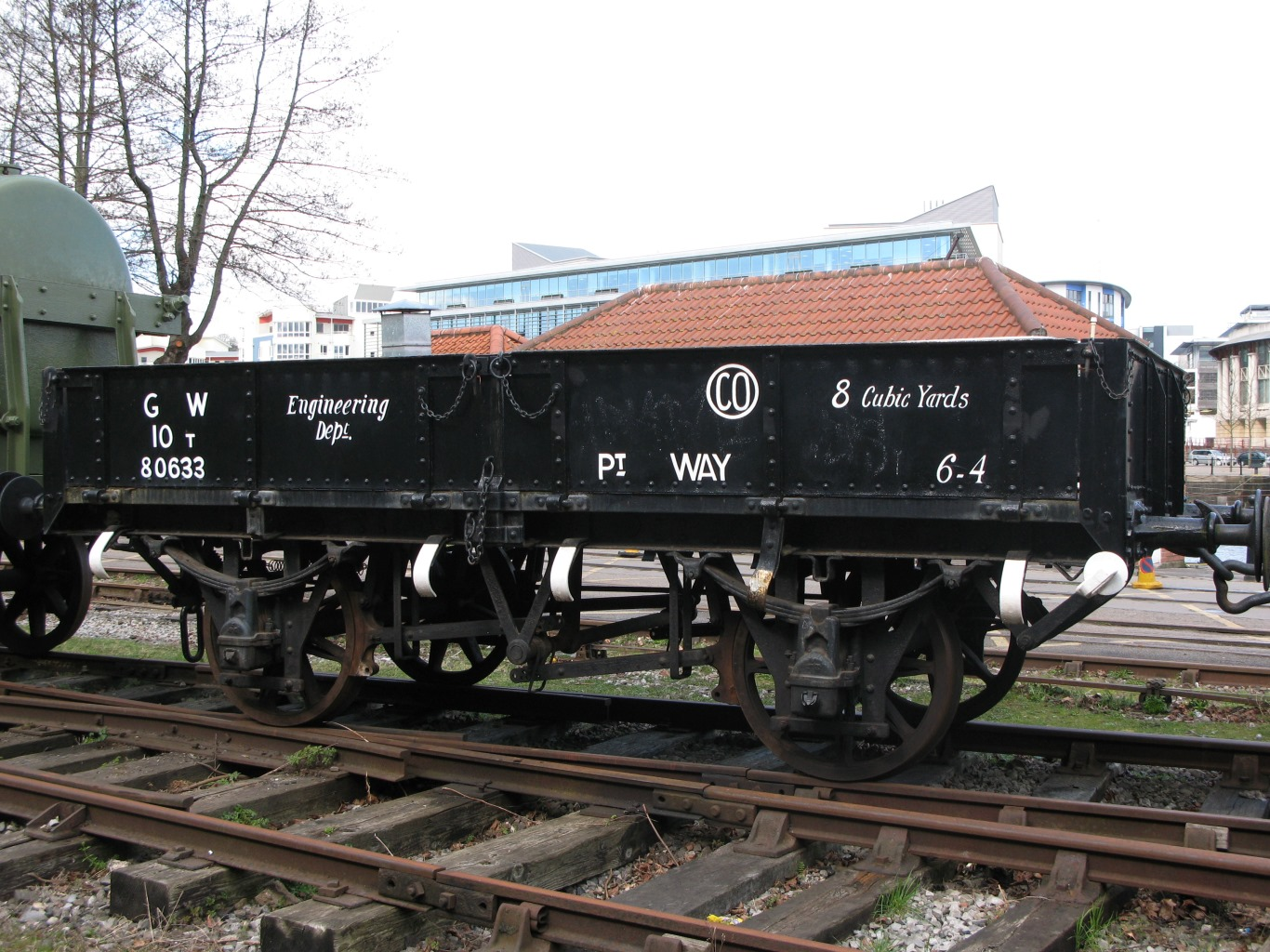
Diagram P15 ballast wagon

A wide variety of specialised wagons were reserved for the use of various railway departments. The Locomotive Department had a large fleet of coal wagons and many were constructed from iron. They were allocated diagrams in the N series alongside ordinary mineral wagons for revenue earning traffic but were identified by a large 'LOCO' painted on the sides. The more common designs carried either 10 tons (diagrams N6 and N7) or 20 tons (N2, N4 and N5) but there were some exceptionally large bogie wagons such as diagram N11 that carried 40 tons.

The Engineers Department had many different wagons for their specialised needs such as the ballast wagons which were all given diagram numbers in the P series. Most of these were small iron open wagons varying from 8 to 20 tons capacity, but some had specialised discharge systems – P6, P7 and P22 were hoppers, and a number of side-tipping wagons were also bought in 1930 but never allocated a diagram number. Rail wagons ('Ganes') were mixed in with revenue earning bogie bolsters in the J diagrams, but open wagons for new sleepers had their own T diagram series, which also included special well wagons to carry sleepers with their rail chairs fixed to them (T1, T12 and T13).

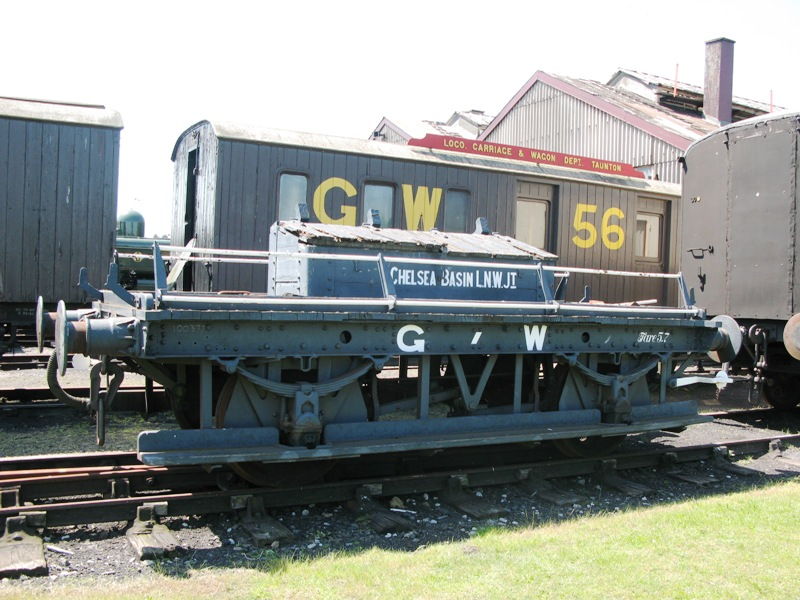
Diagram M4 shunters' truck

The operating department had a requirement for wagons to carry gas for carriage lighting. These were given the telegraphic code 'Cordon' and came in two distinct styles, with two long tanks along the length of the wagon (diagram DD5) or nine short tanks stacked across the wagon (DD4). There were also match or 'shunting' trucks to connect broad and standard gauge wagons until the broad gauge was abandoned in 1892, or to run with overhanging or dangerous loads. These were originally just ordinary flat trucks run without a load, but in later years a number of old wagons were kept for this purpose and given diagrams L21 to L23. Cranes also had match trucks of various styles in diagrams L1 to L20. Shunters' trucks were another kind of flat wagon and could be found in diagrams M1 to M5. These had full length footboards and handrails for shunters who rode on them during movements around or to and from stations and depots. These wagons carried a distinctive asymmetrical toolbox and usually had their depot name painted on this.

=== Brake vans ===
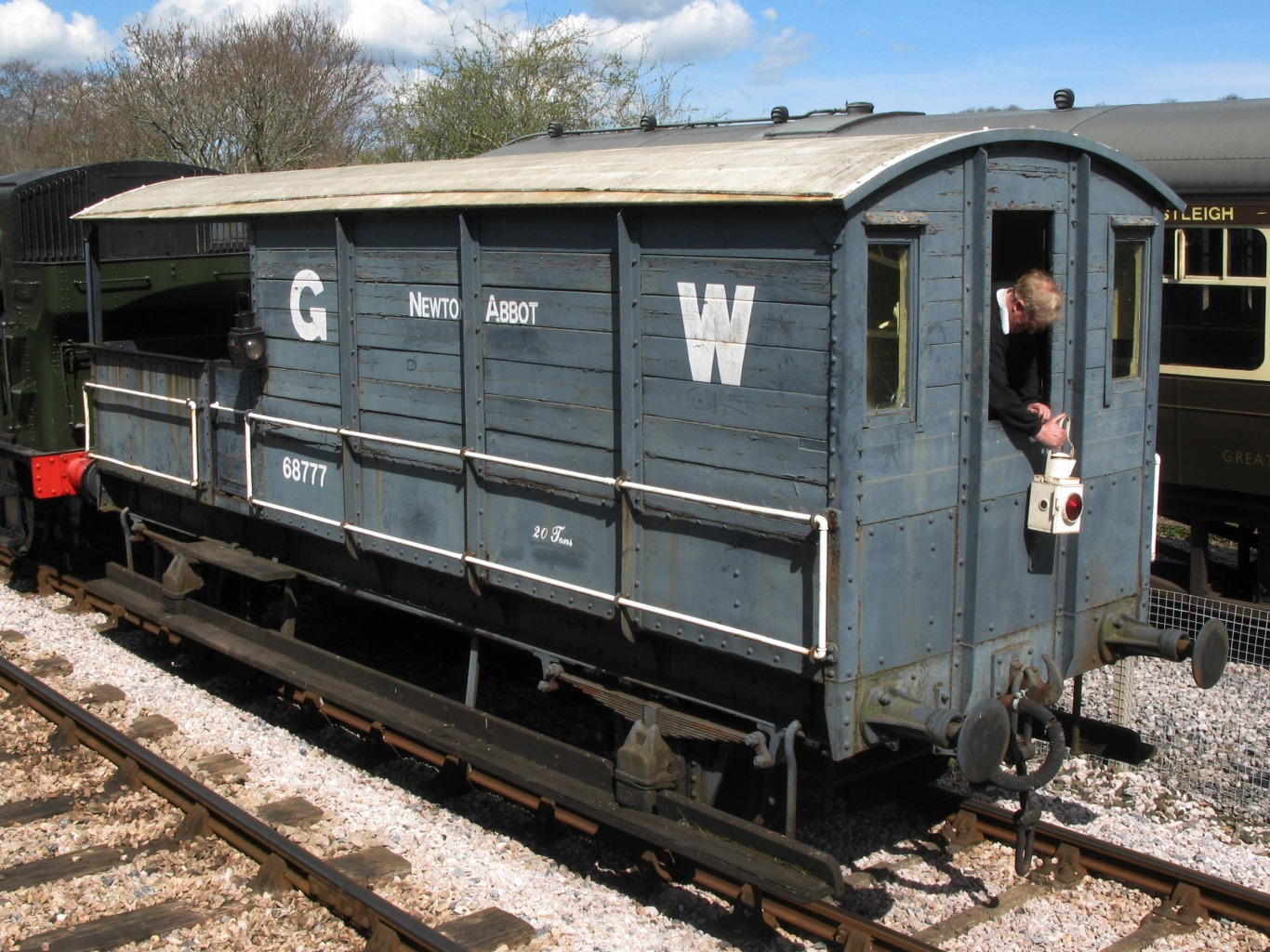
Diagram AA20 Toad

Every goods train needed a brake van at the end for the guard to travel in. Most wagons were fitted with only hand brakes and so the brake van had an important part to play in the safe running of goods trains, but even once trains fitted with vacuum brakes were introduced (from 1904) a guard was required to travel at the rear of every train. Most carried the name of their home depot on the side. Early vans were just 10 or 12 tons weight, but this gradually increased to 20 tons.

The familiar Great Western brake van (given the telegraph code of 'Toad' and allocated diagrams in the AA series) had a large cabin extending about two-thirds of the length of the van, with the remaining 'veranda' open on three sides but covered with a roof. Full length footboards and hand rails allowed the guard or a shunter to ride on the outside during shunting movements. A full height door allowed access from the veranda to the cabin which was fitted with windows in both ends to allow him to see out and keep an eye on his train. Sand boxes were fitted to allow the rails to be sanded if necessary to stop the wheels slipping, and tool boxes, cupboards, a seat and stove were also part of the equipment.

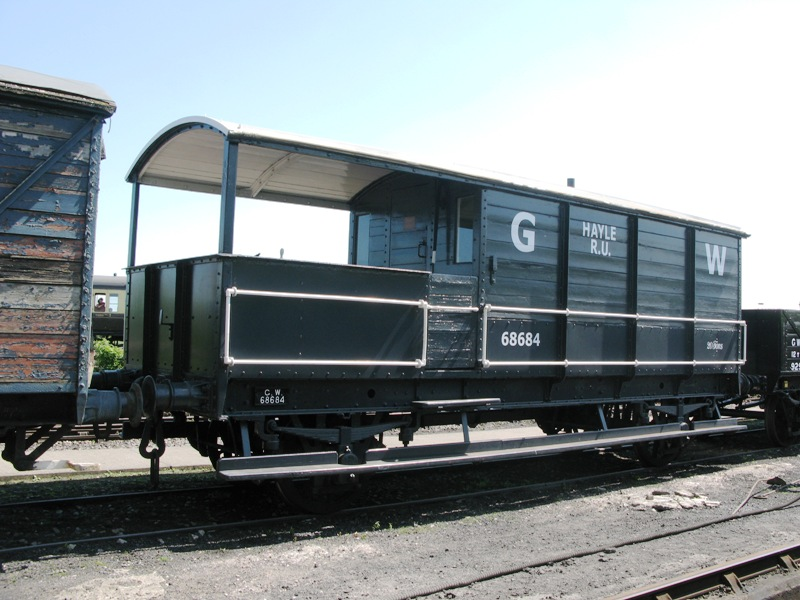
Diagram AA15 Toad.

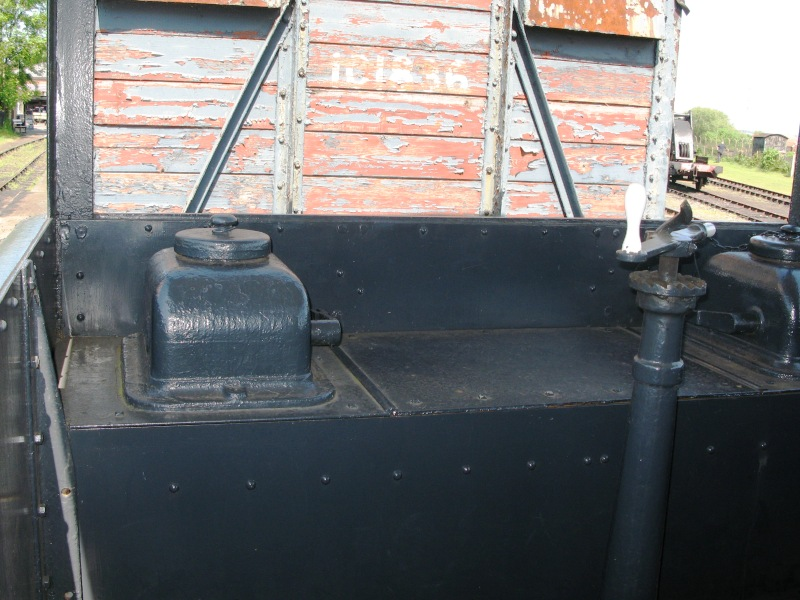
Sand boxes and hand brake on the veranda

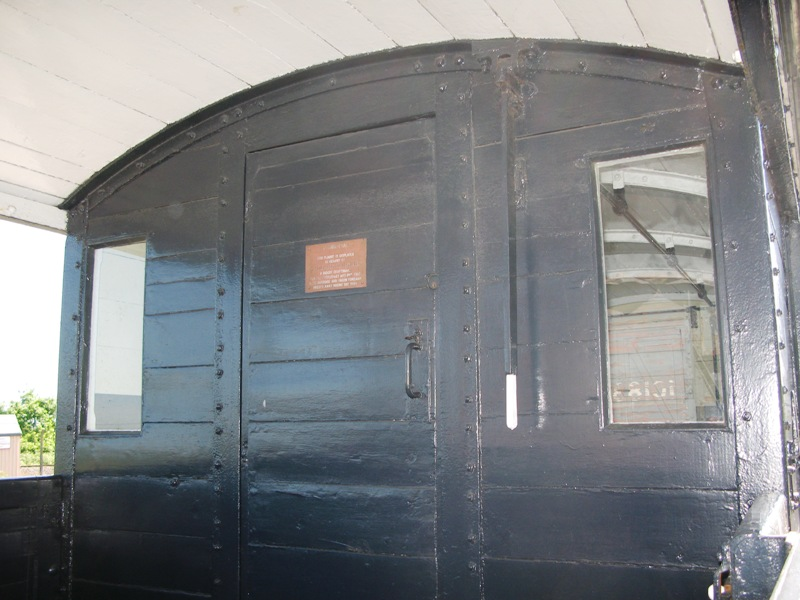
The handle for operating the sand boxes

== Telegraphic codes ==
All wagons for public traffic had a code name that was used in telegraphic messages. This was usually painted onto the wagon and it became common to refer to them by these names even when not using the telegraph. Many had an extra letter added to identify distinctive features, for example a 'Macaw A' was a 17 feet (5.2 m) bolster wagon, but a 'Macaw B' was a 45 feet (14 m) bolster wagon.

- Aero – airscrew wagon (from 1941)
- Ale – cattle wagon, converted to carry beer barrels (from 1940)
- Asmo – covered motor car truck
- Beaver – flat truck
- Beetle – special cattle truck
- Bloater – fish van
- Bocar – covered truck for car bodies
- Cone – gunpowder van
- Conflat – flat wagon for containers
- Coral – glass wagon
- Cordon – gas reservoir truck
- Covcar – covered carriage truck
- Crocodile – well trolley
- Damo – covered motor car truck
- Fruit – fruit van
- Gadfly – aeroplane truck
- Gane – engineers' rail truck
- Grano – covered grain hopper
- Hydra – well truck for passenger vehicles
- Loriot – machine truck
- Macaw – timber truck
- Mayfly – transformer truck
- Mex – standard cattle wagon
- Mica – meat van
- Mink – goods van
- Milta – milk tanker
- Mite – twin timber trucks
- Mogo – covered motor car wagon
- Morel – propeller truck
- Open – open wagon
- Parto – goods van with movable partitions
- Pollen – girder/boiler truck
- Rectank – machinery trolley
- Roder – flat truck for road vehicles (to 1935)
- Rotruck – road-rail truck for milk tankers
- Serpent – carriage truck
- Tadpole – open fish wagons
- Tevan – converted Mica for special traffic
- Toad – goods brake van
- Totem – armour plate/girder wagon
- Tourn – eight-wheeled open wagon (to 1934)

== Diagram codes ==
With very few exceptions, all GWR wagons were allocated a page in a diagram book showing their major dimensions and characteristics. Each page had an alpha-numeric identification; the letters gave the general type of wagon, while the numbers identified more detailed characteristics of the wagons. For example, O8 was a 25 feet (7.6 m) open wagon, but V8 was a 28.5 feet (8.7 m) banana van while V7 was a 21 feet (6.4 m) ventilated goods van.

- A – Articulated wagons for boilers, etc.
- B – Armour plate wagons, etc.
- C – Boiler trucks
- D – Plate glass wagons
- E – Wheel/propeller wagons
- F – Steam roller trucks
- G – Motor car trucks
- H – Flat wagons
- J – Rail/timber wagons
- K – Crane testing wagons
- L – Match trucks
- M – Shunters' trucks
- N – Coal/mineral wagons
- O – Open merchandise wagons
- P – Ballast/sand wagons
- Q – Provender wagons
- R – Manure wagons
- S – Fish wagons
- T – Permanent Way wagons
- U – Stone wagons
- V – Covered goods vans
- W – Cattle trucks
- X – Meat vans
- Y – Fruit vans
- Z – Gunpowder vans
- AA – Goods brake vans
- BB – Stores vans
- CC – Tool/workshop vans
- DD – Tanker wagons
- EE – Flat wagons for tanks
- FF – Trestle plate wagons
