= List of rolling stock preserved on the South Devon Railway =

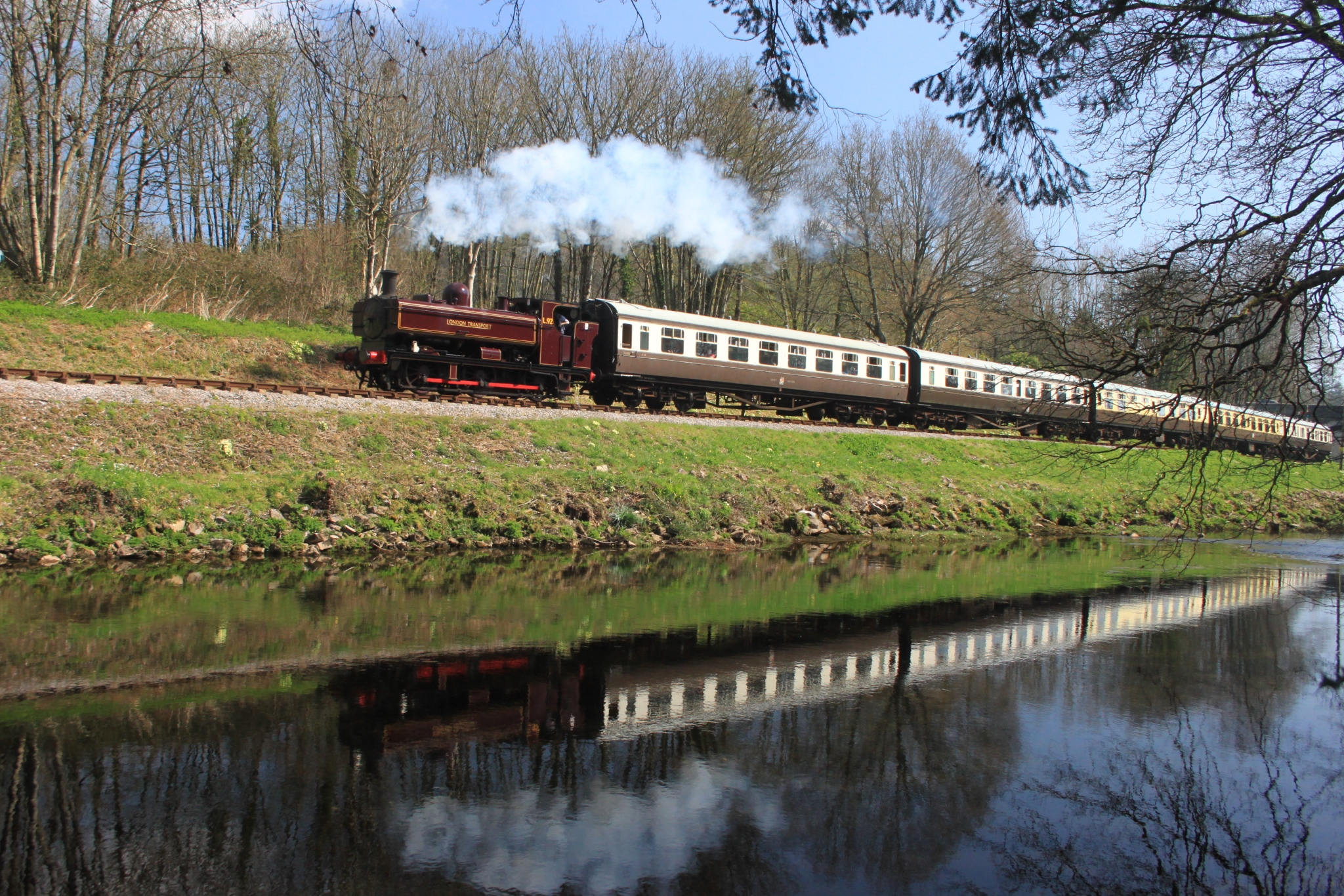
L92 with a train of GWR coaches beside the River Dart near Staverton

The rolling stock preserved on the South Devon Railway is used to operate passenger services on the railway and for its maintenance. Other items are displayed for their historic interest or are awaiting restoration.

The South Devon Railway (SDR) is a 6 mi 51 ch (10.7 km) heritage railway in Devon, England. Originally a branchline to Ashburton from Totnes between 1872 and 1962, it was reopened by the Dart Valley Railway from near Totnes to Buckfastleigh in 1969. It was sold to the non-profit South Devon Railway Trust in 1991.

The SDR's collection includes many examples of steam locomotives typical of Great Western Railway types that used to work in Devon, also other types of steam locomotives and a number of diesel locomotives. The most notable locomotive on display is Tiny, a South Devon Railway 0-4-0vb shunting locomotive which is in the museum at Buckfastleigh station. This is the only original 7 ft 1/4 in (2,140 mm) broad gauge locomotive still in existence in the United Kingdom.

There are a number of historic coaches in use including two 'GWR Super Saloons' coaches once used for trans-Atlantic liner passengers, and several auto coaches that were used on small branch lines such as this.

The engine sheds and workshops are at Buckfastleigh. Wagons used for maintaining the line are mostly kept at Staverton railway station and some rolling stock is stored at Totnes Riverside.

== Steam locomotives ==
Many of the steam locomotives operating on the South Devon Railway are Great Western Railway (GWR) designs which would have worked on the line and nearby. There are also several locomotives from industrial facilities such as quarries and gas works, including some from locations in Devon.

=== Operational steam locomotives ===
Image	Number & name	Class	Wheels	Built	To SDR	Notes
	1369	GWR 1366	0-6-0PT	1934	1966	This class of six locomotives were designed for shunting around docks and on branch lines with tight curves. 1369 was built at Swindon in 1934. It worked at Swindon and on the Weymouth Quay branch until 1962 when it moved to Cornwall to work the Bodmin and Wenford branch until replaced by diesel locomotives in 1964. Its next overhaul is due in 2029.
	5526	GWR 4575	2-6-2T	1928	1992	5526 was built in 1928 and worked from many sheds in Devon and Cornwall: St Blazey, Bodmin, Exeter, Plymouth Millbay, Plymouth Laira and Truro before being withdrawn from Westbury in 1962. It then went to Barry scrap yard from where it was purchased in 1985. It was moved to Swindon for restoration but this was not completed until it was sold to a new group and moved to Buckfastleigh. Its next major overhaul is due in 2027.
	6430	GWR 6400	0-6-0PT	1937	2021	6430 was originally bought in 1966 by the Dart Valley Railway from Cashmore's Scrapyard, Newport as a source of spares for fellow 6400 class locomotives 6412 and 6435. It was sold to a new owner in 1989 and restored at the Llangollen Railway, where it first steamed in 2003, and was based there for many years, including visits to other railways. In 2021, the locomotive left the Llangollen Railway for contract repairs at Buckfastleigh, formally becoming a member of the home fleet in December 2021.

=== Steam locomotives under overhaul, repair or restoration ===
Image	Number & name	Class	Wheels	Built	To SDR	Notes
	1420	GWR 1400	0-4-2T	1933	1965	The 1400 Class were fitted with controls for working autotrains which could be driven with the locomotive at the back of the train. They were a familiar sight on the Buckfastleigh line for many years before its closure. 1420 final location was Gloucester from where it was withdrawn on 2 February 1964. It came to Buckfastleigh on 17 October 1965.
	5542	GWR 4575	2-6-2T	1928	2019	5542 was built in 1928 and initially allocated to Gloucester but later worked at other depots including Newton Abbot. It was withdrawn from service in December 1961 and sold to the Woodham Brothers for scrap but was sold by them to preservationists in 1976 and moved to the West Somerset Railway for restoration and returned to steam in 2002.It was taken out of service in 2022 for an overhaul.
	6412	GWR 6400	0-6-0PT	1934	1966	The 6400 Class were 'pannier tanks' fitted with controls for working autotrains. Three were sold to the Dart Valley Railway and 6412 was eventually transferred to the Torbay Steam railway before being sold to the West Somerset Railway (WSR) in 1976. While on that line it starred in The Flockton Flyer television series. Trains on the WSR became too heavy for such a small locomotive so was sold to the South Devon Railway Trust and returned to Buckfastleigh in 2009. Its next overhaul is expected in 2025.
	47 Carnarvon	Kitson	0-6-0ST	1934	1993	Kitson's 5474 was built to a Manning Wardle design for Stewarts and Lloyds' steel works at Corby in 1934, numbered by them as 47 and named Carnarvon after that town in Wales. After it was no longer needed it was sold in 1969 to the Worcester Locomotive Society and used on the Severn Valley Railway before moving to the Bulmers Railway Centre in Hereford in 1970, even being used for shunting wagons for Bulmer's in 1973.
	Lady Angela	Peckett R2	0-4-0ST	1926	1976	This small locomotive was built by Peckett and Sons in 1926 (works number 1690) and used to transport gypsum 2.7 miles (4.3 km) from a mine at New Kingston to sidings on the main line at Kegworth. Its name was that of the second Lady Belper on whose estate the mine was situated. The locomotive was sold in the 1971 after closure of the line and initially preserved on the Battlefield Line Railway. It came to Buckfastleigh in July 1976. Reported as being overhauled in December 2023.

=== Steam locomotives on static display or stored awaiting overhaul ===
Image	Number & name	Class	Wheels	Built	To SDR	Notes
	3205	GWR 2251	0-6-0	1946	1998	The 2251 Class were small locomotives introduced in 1930 for working lightly-laid routes in Wales although 3205 was used for a time on the former Somerset and Dorset route. It was withdrawn in 1965 and came to the Dart Valley Railway for preservation. From 1967 it spent time on the Severn Valley Railway and West Somerset Railway before returning to Buckfastleigh in 1998. It was taken out of service in 2017 and is still awaiting an overhaul in 2023.
	5786	GWR 5700	0-6-0PT	1930	1996	The 5700 Class were the most common of the Great Western Railway's 'pannier tanks' with 863 built between 1929 and 1949. After British Railways had no further use for 5786 it was sold to the London Transport Executive and, carrying the number L92, worked engineers trains on the Metropolitan line until 1971. It was then preserved by the Worcester Locomotive Society on the Severn Valley Railway and at Hereford before coming to the South Devon Railway. Its boiler certificate expired in May 2023.
	Ashley	Peckett M5	0-4-0T	1942	1969	Peckett and Sons of Bristol built this (their works number 2031) in 1942 for use at Exeter Gas Works where it carried number 1. In 1969 it was withdrawn and moved to Buckfastleigh, arriving on 23 September. It is on display in the museum at Buckfastleigh.
	Glendower	Hunslet Austerity	0-6-0T	1954	1978	The 'Austerity' tanks were designed for the War Department in World War II but continued to be built afterwards. Glendower was built by Hunslet in 1954 (works number 3810) for the Ministry of Supply and went to work for the National Coal Board. After working at a number of collieries, it was withdrawn from Hafodyrynys in 1973. It was restored to working order in September 1976 and moved to Buckfastleigh in 1978.

=== Non-standard gauge steam ===
These locomotives are on display at Buckfastleigh.

Image	Number & name	Class	Gauge	Built	To SDR	Notes
	2180 Tiny	SDR	7 ft 1/4 in (2,140 mm)	1868	1980	This small four-wheel vertically boilered locomotive was built in 1868 to shunt the dockside railways around Plymouth but later moved to Newton Abbot where it was put to use in the workshops as a stationary power source. It was moved across to the railway station in 1927 and displayed on the platform before being placed in the museum at Buckfastleigh. It is the only original broad gauge locomotive still in existence in the United Kingdom. It is on loan from the National Collection.
	Lee Moor No. 2	Peckett M4	4 ft 6 in (1,372 mm)	1899	2001	Two 0-4-0T locomotives were built by Peckett and Sons to work the upper section of the Lee Moor Tramway near Plymouth. Very little traffic was carried on this part of the tramway by the 1940s and No. 2 was last used on 3 March 1947. It and one surviving wagon were restored by some members of the Plymouth Railway Circle for display at Saltram House near Plymouth in 1978. They were moved to Buckfastleigh in 2001.

== Diesel locomotives ==
=== Operational Diesel locomotives ===
Image	Number & name	Class	Built	To SDR	Notes
	D3721	Class 09	1959	2010	D3721 was built in 1959 with the higher-speed gearing used by the Southern Region of British Railways. It started service in April 1959 and was withdrawn in 2004 by which time it was carrying number 09010. After spending some time in store, DB Schenker sold it to the South Devon Railway in 2010 where it arrived in September that year.
	33002	Class 33	1960	2008	The Class 33s were built for the Southern Region. D6501 entered service in February 1960 but was renumbered as 33002 in 1974. It was given the name Sea King in 1991 and withdrawn in November 1996. It was then brought to Buckfastleigh to be preserved and entered service here in July 2008.
	25262	Class 25	1966	1999	D7612 was delivered new to Glasgow Eastfield depot in April 1966 but moved south into England within a few months, eventually spending many years at Bescot TMD where it was renumbered 25262 in March 1974. In 1985 it went to Carlisle Kingmoor TMD and was renumbered again to 25901, which identified it as one of a pool of twelve locomotives allocated to a special pool for working chemical traffic. It was withdrawn in March 1987 and sold to Harry Needle Railroad Company who sold it in 1989 for preservation on the East Lancashire Railway. In 1999 it was sold again and moved to Buckfastleigh.
	D7535	Class 25	1965	2018	Moved to the railway from the Dartmouth Steam Railway in 2018

=== Diesel locomotives stored or under restoration ===
Image	Number & name	Class	Built	To SDR	Notes
	D402 Superb	Class 50	1967	1991; 2003	The fifty Class 50s were built to replace steam locomotives working on the West Coast Main Line. D402 was based at Crewe Diesel TMD from 1967 to 1973 when it was transferred to Bristol Bath Road TMD but moved to Plymouth Laira in 1976. It renumbered 50002 in April 1974 and from 1978 carried the name Superb after the Royal Navy submarine HMS Superb. It was withdrawn in 1991 but was the first preserved Class 50 to have its engine started up. It is currently (2023) undergoing restoration.
	D6737	Class 37	1962	2004	Arrived on the railway in early 2004
	D7541	Class 25	1965	2011	D7541 was withdrawn from Crewe Diesel depot in March 1987 and was initially preserved on the North Yorkshire Moors Railway. It came to Buckfastleigh in April 2011 but is in need of restoration before it can be put into service.
	MFP 4	0-4-0DH	1958	1977	John Fowler & Co. built this diesel-mechanical locomotive for the Ministry of Fuel and Power in 1958. It was used by Esso at places such as Milford Haven and Flax Bourton It came to the South Devon Railway in 1977.
	Yorkie	0-6-0DE	1959	1994	The Yorkshire Engine Company built this diesel-electric shunter (works number 2745) for the National Coal Board in 1959. It worked at Agecroft Colliery near Manchester as their L052 until 1984, after which it was preserved at the Chatterley Whitfield Mining Museum near Stoke-on-Trent. It moved to the South Devon Railway in 1994 where it is referred to as 'Yorkie'.

== Diesel Multiple Units ==
Image	Number	Class	Built	To SDR	Notes
	51352 & 51376	Class 117		2020	A class 117 Diesel multiple unit. Arrived at the railway in 2020.
	55000	Class 122	1958	1996	The first Class 122 (a single-car Motor Brake Second with driving cabs at each end) built by the Gloucester Railway Carriage and Wagon Company. It was delivered to British Railways in 1958 and saw use on local lines including the Kingsbridge branch line.
	59493	Class 117	1960	2018?	Class 117 Trailer Composite Lavatory.
	59740	Class 115	1960	1993?	Class 115 Trailer Second currently being used as a buffet coach at Staverton.

== Coaching stock ==
Passenger coaches on the South Devon Railway are mostly Great Western Railway (GWR) or British Railways (BR) designs.

Image	Number	Company	Type	Built	Notes
	2	Monmouth	Composite	1848	Four-wheel composite built by Smith Wylie for the Monmouth Railway and numbered 2. Later GWR 484. Withdrawn in 1890 and now mounted on an old wagon chassis.
	225	GWR	Autocoach	1951	
	228	GWR	Autocoach	1951	
	233	GWR	Autocoach	1951	
	249	GWR	Saloon	1894	A directors' saloon which was sometimes used in the Royal train. It includes a drawing room, private compartment and kitchen. It was designed by William Dean with a so-called 'royal clerestory roof, that is a raised section along the length of the vehicles roof which is curved down to project slightly over the ends. In later years it was used as an engineer's saloon until withdrawn in 1963.
	276	GWR	BG	1945	
	594	GWR	CCT	1920	Telegraphic code 'Monster'
	790	GWR	Dynamometer	1901	This was coupled behind locomotives that were being tested. The locomotive's performance could be measured and a Hallade recorder measuered the motion of the coach. As well as the running wheels there is a flangeless wheel which is lowered onto the rail to measure the speed of the train. It was withdrawn in 1961 and preserved in 1965 but the recording equipment has all been removed.
	1285	GWR	TO	1937	
	1295	GWR	TO	1937	
	1316	GWR	Siphon G	1950	
	1645	GWR	BTK	1938	
	1697	BR	RBR	1961	
	1917	BR	RU	1958	
	2180	GWR	BTK	1950	
	2434	GWR		1910	
	4496	BR	TSO	1956	
	4785	BR	SO	1957	
	4805	BR	SO	1957	Converted to buffet car.
	4872	GWR	TK	1926	
	4962	BR	TSO	1962	
	6515	GWR	BCK	1926	
	7377	GWR	BCK	1937	
	9111; King George	GWR	Saloon	1931	One of the extra-wide (9 ft 7 in (2.92 m) Super Saloons that were used to convey ocean liner passengers landing at Millbay docks in Plymouth. It was withdrawn in 1967 and sold to the South Devon Railway Association as a members' coach.
	9116; Duchess of York	GWR	Saloon	1932	This Super Saloon was sold to the Dart Valley Railway Company for their directors' use. It was transferred to the Torbay Steam Railway in the 1980s but was sold to the South Devon Railway Trust in 2004 and returned to Buckfastleigh.
	9346	GWR	Saloon	1896	A diagram G20 six-wheel saloon, originally numbered 2540 but later 9346. Withdrawn in 1938 and sold for use as a cottage near Bampton. Brought to Buckfastleigh in 2003 for restoration and mounted on an old wagon chassis.
	10680	BR	SLE	1982	
	15644	BR	CK	1956	
	16071	BR	CK	1958	
	34945	BR	BSK	1956	
	34991	BR	BSK	1956	Converted to baggage car.
	35326	BR	BSK	1962	
	35327	BR	BSK	1962	Converted to courier vehicle.
	92035	BR	Fruit Van	1957	Telegraphic code 'Fruit D'
	92067	BR	Fruit Van	1958	Telegraphic code 'Fruit D'
	94556	BR	CCT	1960	
	94852	BR	CCT	1961	

== Goods wagons ==
Heritage goods wagons on the South Devon Railway include many examples from the Great Western Railway (GWR) and British Rail (BR) along with some from other companies. Specialised wagons are used by the Permanent Way Department and others to maintain the railway and its equipment.

Image	Number	Company	Type	Built	Notes
	8	PO	Flat	Unknown	From a cement manufacturer in Purfleet.
	37	PO	Flat	Unknown	From a cement manufacturer in Purfleet, now equipped with weed-killing equipment.
	114	PO	Tank	1929	An RCH 1927 specification tank, registered with the LMS for working on the main line. It was donated by Shell to the Dart Valley Railway in 1970 and painted as Shell Mex number 4492 but currently (2022) carries National Benzole livery and the number 114.
	146	GWR	Tool Van	1908	
	334	PO	Bogie Well Wagon	Unknown	Used at Devonport Dockyard and carrying their number 334, built by the GWR at Swindon Works.
	610	GWR	Crane	1893	This hand-operated crane was based at Buckfastleigh to load and unload goods. In the 1920s was left on an isolated section of track and was rescued when the railway was taken over as a heritage line.
	1140	PO	Open	Unknown	A six-plank open wagon that was operated by the Port of Bristol authority with number 59408. It has been painted in the red livery of the Teign Valley Granite Company, a quarry in Bovey Tracey.
	2016	GWR	Milk Tank	1931	
	3037	GWR	Milk Tank	1946	
	7303	PO	Tar Tank	1939	A cylindrical tar tank used by the National Coal Board at Caerphilly, registered with the GWR for use on the main line.
	16295	GWR	Van	1917	Telegraphic code 'Mink', diagram V16.
	17295	GWR	Brake Van	1943	Telegraphic code 'Toad', diagram AA20.
	35420	GWR	Brake Van	1949	Telegraphic code 'Toad', diagram AA23.
	42223	GWR	Motor Car Van	1923	Telegraphic code 'Damo', diagram M1.
	41873	GWR	Shunter's Truck	1896	Diagram M1.
	47528	GWR	Van	1896	Telegraphic code 'Mink', iron body, diagram V6. Original number 59119. later 079041 while part of British Rail's Bristol Area Tunnel Inspection Train. It is carrying number 47528 while painted in 'Salvage for Victory' colours.
	68777	GWR	Brake Van	1939	Telegraphic code 'Toad', diagram AA20.
	68786	GWR	Brake Van	1939	Telegraphic code 'Toad', diagram AA20.
	95979	GWR	Van	1917	Telegraphic code 'Mink', diagram V16.
	96835	GWR	Van	1921	Telegraphic code 'Mink', diagram V16.
	100715	GWR	Well	1925	A 'chaired sleeper' wagon, diagram T13.
	102776	GWR	Open	1925	Port of Bristol Authority wagon 63078, GWR diagram O22 but original number uncertain.
	104700	GWR	Van	1923	Port of London Authority wagon A66, GWR diagram V18.Telegraphic code 'Mink'.
	105916	GWR	Meat Van	1925	Refrigerated van, GWR diagram X8.Telegraphic code 'Mica'.
	108207	GWR	Open	1927	GWR diagram O22.Telegraphic code 'Open'.
	126359	GWR	Motor Car Van	1934	Telegraphic code 'Damo'
	230935	LNER	Flat Wagon	1939	A flat wagon with ramped ends, last used at Laira Depot. Telegraphic code 'Mac' (LNER), 'Lowmac' (BR).
	263278	LNER	Flat Wagon	1945	A flat wagon with ramped ends, telegraphic code 'Mac' (LNER), 'Lowmac' (BR).
	460370	LMSR	Open	1923	An LMSR van, now converted to a 1-plank open wagon.
	506327	LMSR	Van	1935	An LMSR van, diagram D1897.
	512312	LMSR	Van	1940	An LMSR van, diagram D2039.
	550179	BR	Open	1958	16 ton mineral wagon.
	592433	BR	Open	1958	16 ton mineral wagon.
	741574	BR	Open	1957	Telegraphic Code 'Pipe'.
	743010	BR	Open	1955	Telegraphic Code 'Clayhood'.
	753100	GWR	Van	1934	Built by the GWR to diagram V26 and numbered 125814, it has been painted and numbered to represent one of the similar vans built after 1948 by British Rail. Telegraphic Code 'Mink' (GWR), 'Vanfit' (BR).
	766153	BR	Van	1955	Telegraphic Code 'Vanfit'.
	783746	BR	Van	1959	Telegraphic Code 'Vanfit'.
	786393	BR	Van	1962	Telegraphic Code 'Vanfit'
	854395	BR	Van	1958	Telegraphic Code 'Shocvan'.
	889009	BR	Ferry Van	1958	A four-wheel van for with end loading doors for motor cars.
	889015	BR	Ferry Van	1958	A four-wheel van for with end loading doors for motor cars.
	909054	BR	Flat Wagon	1960	A bogie flat wagon with ramped ends, last used at Laira Depot. Telegraphic code 'Rectank'.
	909069	BR	Flat Wagon	1960	A bogie flat wagon with ramped ends, last used at Laira Depot. Telegraphic code 'Rectank'.
	944769	BR	Bogie Bolster	1955	
	953640	BR	Brake Van	1958	
	983263	BR	Ballast Hopper	1957	Telegraphic code 'Dogfish'
	984176	BR	Open	1958	Ballast/sleeper wagon, telegraphic code 'Grampus'.
	984872	BR	Open	1957	Ballast/sleeper wagon, telegraphic code 'Grampus'.
	993247	BR	Ballast Hopper	1957	Telegraphic code 'Dogfish'
	993471	BR	Ballast Hopper	1957	Telegraphic code 'Dogfish'
	993710	BR	Ballast Plough	1951	Telegraphic code ' Shark'

=== Narrow gauge ===
Image	Number	Company	Type	Built	Notes
	44	Lee Moor Tramway	Open	Unknown	4 ft 6 in (1,372 mm) gauge.

== Past members of the SDR fleet ==
Locomotives and multiple units which have been based on the South Devon Railway in the past. These lists do not include locomotives based on other lines that were short term visitors, for example to a gala weekend or for a season.

=== Steam ===
Image	Number	Class	Wheels	Built	On SDR	Notes
	1450	GWR 1400	0-4-2T	1935	1966 - 1991?	This locomotive was withdrawn from Exmouth Junction, Exeter, in May 1965 and came to the Dart Valley Railway for preservation, entering service in 1973. Since leaving here it has had periods based on the Dean Forest Railway and Severn Valley Railway.
	1638	GWR 1600	0-6-0PT	1951	1967 - 1992	Although built to a Great Western Railway design, the 1600 Class were built by the Western Region of British Railways. 1638 was withdrawn in Wales during August 1966 and arrived at Buckfastleigh in November 1967. It moved to the Kent and East Sussex Railway in 1992.
	3803	GWR 2884	2-8-0	1939	1983 - 2022	A heavy freight locomotive. Withdrawn by British Railways in July 1963 and sold for scrap, it came to Buckfastleigh in November 1983 for restoration and entered service in 2005. It was sold to the Dartmouth Steam Railway along with the remains of similar locomotive 2873.
	4555	GWR 4500	2-6-2T	1924	1965 - 1972	4555 was built in 1924 at Swindon Works and worked the last British Railways freight train on the Ashburton branch in 1962. It was withdrawn the following year and returned to Totnes on 5 October 1965 for preservation and hauled the official opening train in 1969. It moved to the new Torbay Steam Railway, working trial trains in July 1972 while the line was still operated by British Rail.
	4588	GWR 4575	2-6-2TT	1927	1971 - 1973	4588 was based at Truro for many years. After it was withdrawn it was sold for scrap but was sold to the Dart Valley railway, moving from Barry scrapyard in 1970. It was restored at Swindon Works in 1971 and entered service at Buckfastleigh. It moved to the Torbay & Dartmouth Railway when it opened in 1973.
	4920 Dumbleton Hall	GWR 4900	4-6-0	1929	1974? - 2021	A 'Hall' bought for preservation in 1974 and restored at Buckfastleigh.
	6435	GWR 1600	0-6-0PT	1937	1965 - 2008?	Arrived on the Dart Valley Railway on 17 October 1965. It transferred to the Bodmin and Wenford Railway in 2008 after a spell on the Dartmouth Steam Railway.
	30587	LSWR 0298	2-4-0WT	1874	1978 - 2001	This was one of three such locomotives that ended its days working freight trains on the Wenfordbridge branch in Cornwall, although it had been built for commuter service sin London. It was displayed in the museum at Buckfastleigh for many years on loan from the National Collection and is currently (2023) at the Locomotion Museum.
	80064	BR Standard Class 4	2-6-4T	1953	1973 - 1984	Although based at Exmouth Junction for a while, this locomotive was withdrawn from Bristol in 1965 and sold to the Woodham Brothers for scrap. It was rescued and brought to Buckfastleigh for restoration in 1973, entering service in 1981. It moved to the Bluebell Railway in 1984.
	Bagnall 2766	Hunslet Austerity	0-6-0ST	1944	1978 - 1996	A Hunslet-design 'Austerity' saddle tank built by W. G. Bagnall, it worked in Antwerp before being sold to the National Coal Board in 1947 for use at Treorchy and, from 1970, at Maesteg. It was withdrawn in 1973 and preserved three years later.
	Errol Lonsdale	Hunslet Austerity	0-6-0ST	1953	c.1991 - 2009	A Hunslet 'Austerity' saddle tank (works number 3796) built for the War Department, it was number 196 on the Longmoor Military Railway where it appeared in 'The Great St Trinian's Train Robbery' film. It received the name Errol Lonsdale while preserved on the Mid Hants Railway in 1978. While on the South Devon railway it was painted in the guise of one of the 'Austerities' that were sold to the LNER with the BR number 68011. It is now preserved in Europe.
	Maureen	Hunslet Austerity	0-6-0ST	1943	1978 - 1990s	A saddle tank built by Hunslet (works number 2890) for the War Department, it later operated for the National Coal Board at Maesteg from 1962 until 1973. Since leaving the railway it has been rebuilt as a tender locomotive and carries the name Douglas. At the Spa Valley Railway in 2021.
	Sapper	Hunslet Austerity	0-6-0ST	1944	1994 - 2009	A Hunslet 'Austerity' saddle tank (works number 3153) built for the War Department. It was first numbered 75103 but after the war became 132. It was sold to the National Coal Board and was the last working steam locomotive, being withdrawn from Bold colliery in 1984.

=== Diesel ===
Image	Number and name	Class	Built	On SDR	Notes
	D1023 Western Fusilier	Class 52	1962	1990s	D1023 was one of the 74 'Western' class locomotives that were a familiar sight at Totnes, working express trains to and from Plymouth. It was loaned to the Dart Valley Railway from the National Collection but was usually on display rather than operating.
	D2192	Class 03	1961	1970 - 1977	D2192 was operated by British Rail between 1961 and 1969. It was sold to the Dart Valley Railway, arriving on 25 August 1970, but moved to the Torbay Steam Railway on 24 July 1977.
	D6975	Class 37	1965	? - 2018	D6975 was first allocated to Cardiff Canton and was renumbered as 37275 in 1974. After it was withdrawn in 1999 it was sold into preservation and ended up on the South Devon Railway. It moved to the Dartmouth Steam Railway in 2018 in exchange for Class 25 D7535 as it was considered to be better suited for the heavier trains on that line.
	20110 (D8110)	Class 20	1962	1991 - ?	20110 (which had originally been numbered D8110) was withdrawn in 1990 and came to South Devon Railway the following year.
	20118 (D8118)	Class 20	1962	1999 - 2011	20018 (which had originally been numbered D8118) was taken out of service in 1995 and came to Buckfastleigh in December 1999. It was restored and ran for the first time in May 2000 but was sold in April 2011 to make room for Class 25 D7541. It was painted in the British Rail Railfreight livery and carried the name Saltburn-on-Sea.
	51592 & 51605	Class 127	1959	1984 - 2012	Two power cars from a St Pancras suburban DMU set. They were sold to the Mid Hants Railway but were scrapped as beyond economic repair.
	Dusty	Ruston and Hornsby 165DS	1958	1993 - 2016	Ruston and Hornsby 0-4-0DH number 418793 in 1958 as a demonstration prototype. It was eventually sold to British Gypsum and worked near Newark-on-Trent until 1976 when it was sold to Steetley Minerals for Downlow Quarry near Buxton. It was sold for preservation in 1991, going to the Bulmer's Railway Centre at Hereford. It came to Buckfastleigh in 1993 and was used as the yard pilot for many years.
