= Neilson, Shaw & Macgregor =

Scottish merchant

- Industry: Textiles
- Founded: 1866
- Defunct: 1917
- Headquarters: Glasgow, Scotland

Neilson, Shaw & Macgregor was a Glasgow–based silk mercers and warehouse store that specialised in tartan.

== Background ==
Neilson, Shaw & Macgregor was founded in 1866 at 44 Buchanan Street, taking over the former premises of Campbells, Neilson, Shaw & Company. The building on Buchanan Street was known as 'The Pavilion', which resulted in the firm's telegraphic address of 'Pavilion, Glasgow'.

By the 1880s, the firm had expanded into carpet manufacture and upholstery and was a significant retailer of Scottish tartans. At the 1888 Glasgow International Exhibition, Neilson, Shaw & Macgregor exhibited the tartans of over 140 clans and families. At this time, the firm employed around three hundred members of staff and supplied many prominent individuals from Glasgow and the west of Scotland.

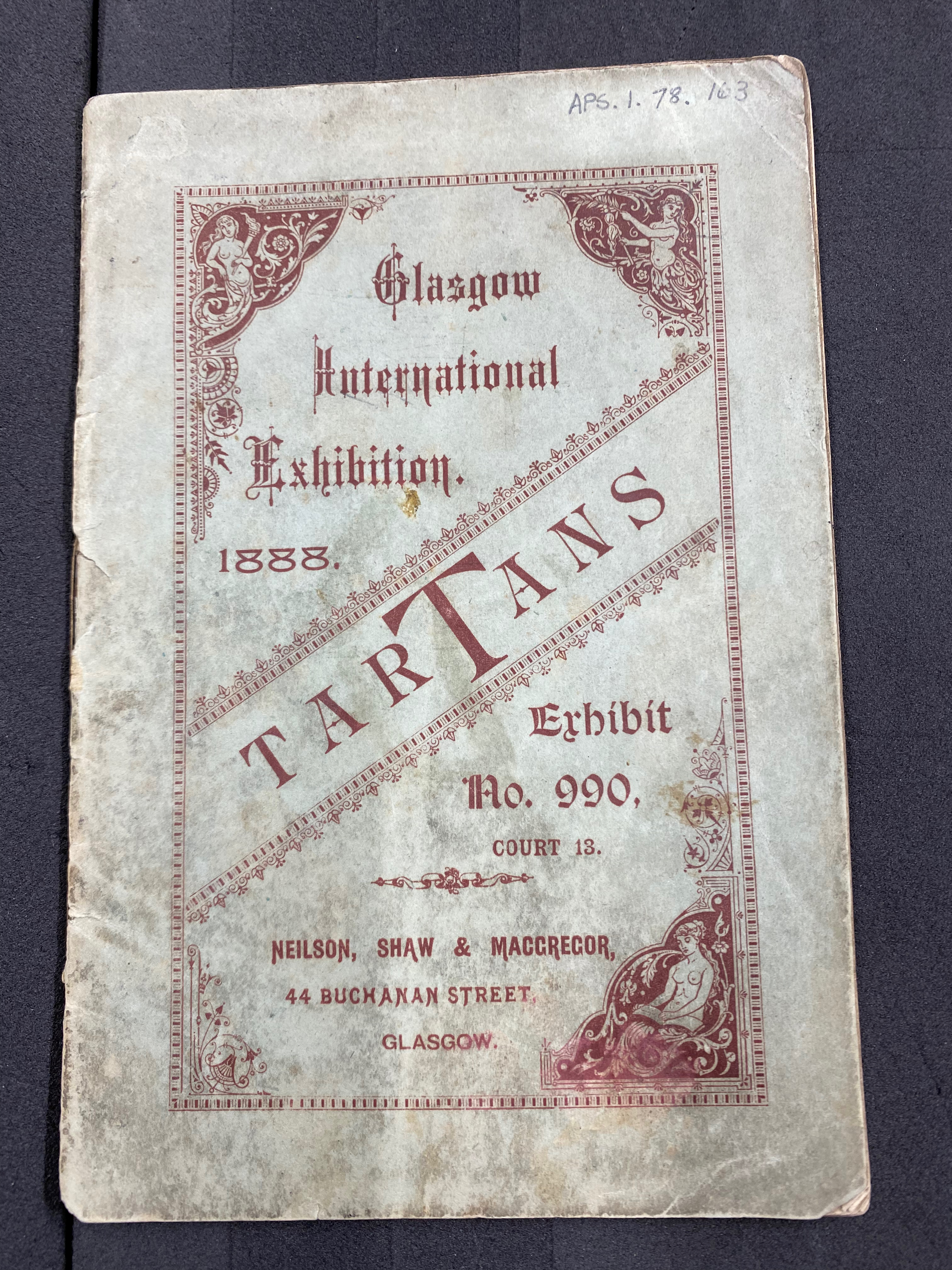
Front page, ‘Descriptive Catalogue of the Clan tartans and Family tartans’, Neilson, Shaw & Macgregor, Glasgow International Exhibition, 1888. National Library of Scotland, APS.1.78.163.

== Exhibitions ==
- 1888 Glasgow International Exhibition.
- 1889 Paris Exhibition – winning a silver medal for tartans.
- 1908 Franco-British Exhibition.

== Closure of the firm ==
Neilson, Shaw & Macgregor closed its doors in 1917. An article in the Hamilton Advertiser declared that the closure 'will leave a blank in Buchanan Street as noticeable as a missing front tooth, for Neilson, Shaw and Macgregor is a well-known city landmark'. The company's stock was sold for a sum of £12,000.
