= Australian railway telegraphic codes =

Terms used in telegrams between various parts of the railway system

Australian railway telegraphic codes were devised to reduce the size of telegraphic messages, though some survived into the telephone era. They were used in telegrams between various parts of the railway system, such as offices, stations, locomotive depots and goods yards.

There is a distinction between the telegraphic codes, and telegraphic code addresses. Many businesses of all kinds identified their telegraphic address, as well as their telephone number, on their stationery. In some states, railway operations would have offices with abbreviated addresses.

== Structure ==
The codes consisted of four-letter "words", in two syllables, with a two-letter difference from any other code. They stood for phrases, thereby saving time and reducing the likelihood of errors in the message. However, a number of codes required additional words and/or numbers to fully explain what was being communicated. Contrary to popular belief, the four letters were not abbreviations of any four-word phrase.

Each state had its own codes, which were updated over time, although some code "words" were common to all states. The codes were listed either on a large poster or in a telegraph code book.

== New South Wales ==
The New South Wales telegraphic code library consisted of 404 four-letter code words, which eliminated the need to transmit 3703 normal words as sentences on a telegraph. An example of how one code word replaced many normal words, the longest code message in the telegraphic lexicon was Ryzy, which, with the addition of a number and location, translates as follows:

Vehicle No ..... may be worked forward to ..... behind the brakevan of a suitable goods train during daylight provided locomotive branch certifies fit to travel. If the damaged vehicle is fitted with automatic coupling it must only be worked forward behind a brakevan also fitted with automatic coupling by connecting the automatic couplers on each vehicle but, if fitted with ordinary drawgear, it must be screw coupled. Westinghouse brake to be in use throughout train and on damaged vehicle. Guard to be given written instructions to carefully watch vehicle en route.

In this example, one code word replaces 90 others.

The New South Wales code word "Wolo", meaning that there were speed restrictions due to high temperatures affecting rails and/or overhead wiring, has now come to be used as shorthand on other Australian rail systems.

== Victoria ==
A small selection of codes from the 1972 Victorian Railways Telegraph Code Book:

- Amex 1234 6789 = Trains 1234 and 6789 will not run (i.e. are cancelled)
- Azor = Arrange to provide assistant locomotive
- Boxo = Air-conditioned accommodation fully booked
- Hebe = If on hand at your station, send by first train
- Pajo = Arrange for joint enquiry to be held at ....... into .......
- Waxy = give matter special attention
- Zebu = arrange and advise all concerned

== Western Australia ==
In Western Australia a code book (Uniform and Supplementary Telegraph Code) was issued as late as 1967 by the Western Australian Government Railways, with a preface that included the wording:

This Telegraph Code has been agreed to by the Railway Commissioners of Government Railways of the Commonwealth of Australia, and applied to the Western Australian Railways

As well as the indication of

The code words printed in capitals are applicable throughout the Railways of the Commonwealth; those printed small type apply to the Western Australian Railways only

The phrase codes related to the categories:

- Train Working
- Motive Power (all local usage)
- Train Arrangements
  - 1. Passengers
  - 2. Goods
  - 3. Rolling Stock
- Traffic Arrangements – goods, parcels and luggage
- Correspondence

== See also ==
- Great Western Railway telegraphic codes
- African Union of Railways
