= Bogie bolster wagon =

British railway term for a wagon for long thin cargoes

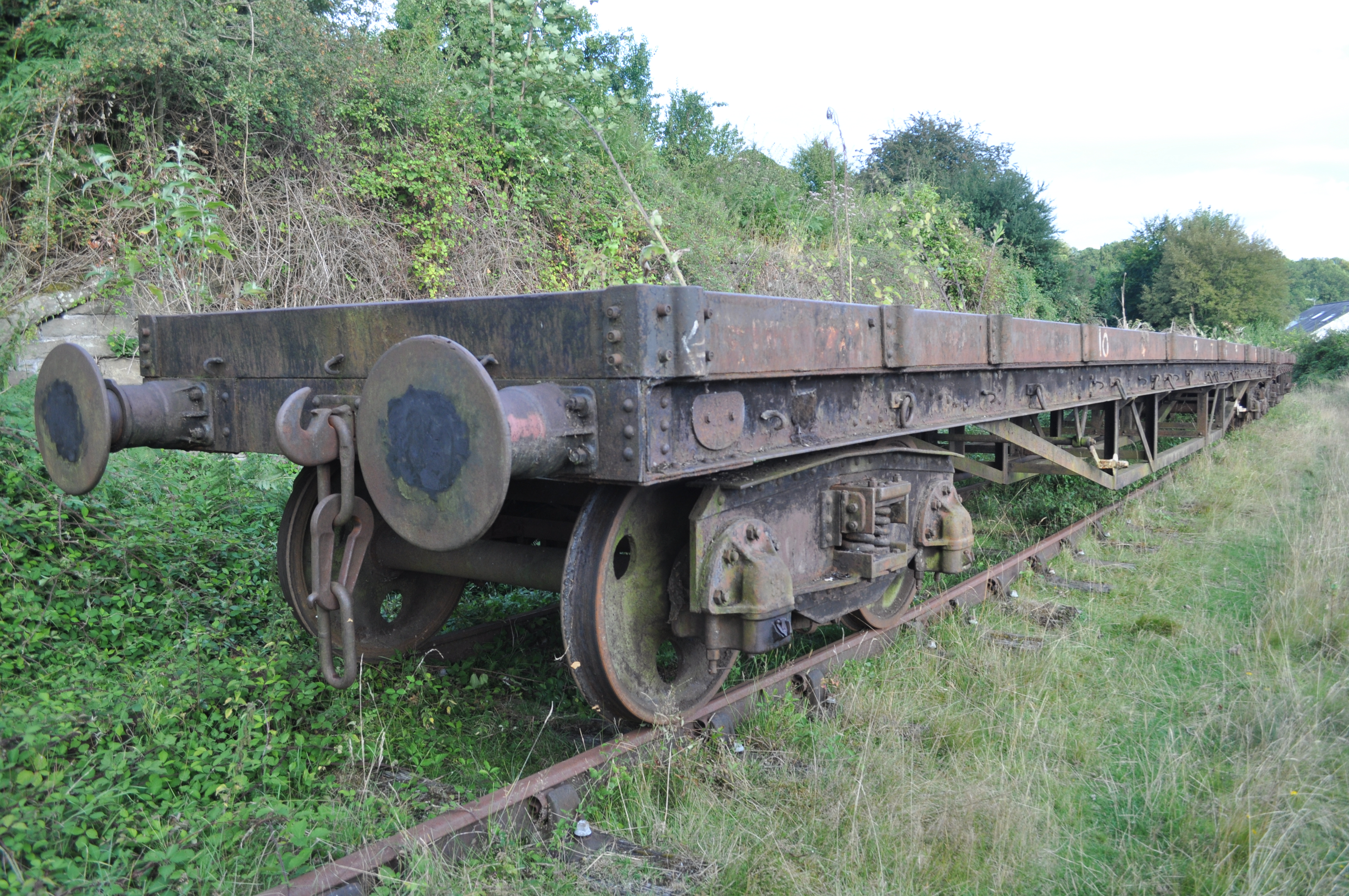
'Gane A' at the Dean Forest Railway

A bogie bolster wagon is a British railway term for a wagon designed to carry long thin cargoes such as timber or rails and other steel sections. The sides and ends are minimal and there is no roof. The load is carried longitudinally and borne by three or more bolsters (half baulks of timber) fixed transversely. The load is constrained sideways by movable metal stanchions fitted into the ends of the bolsters, and secured with chains and shackles.

== Design ==
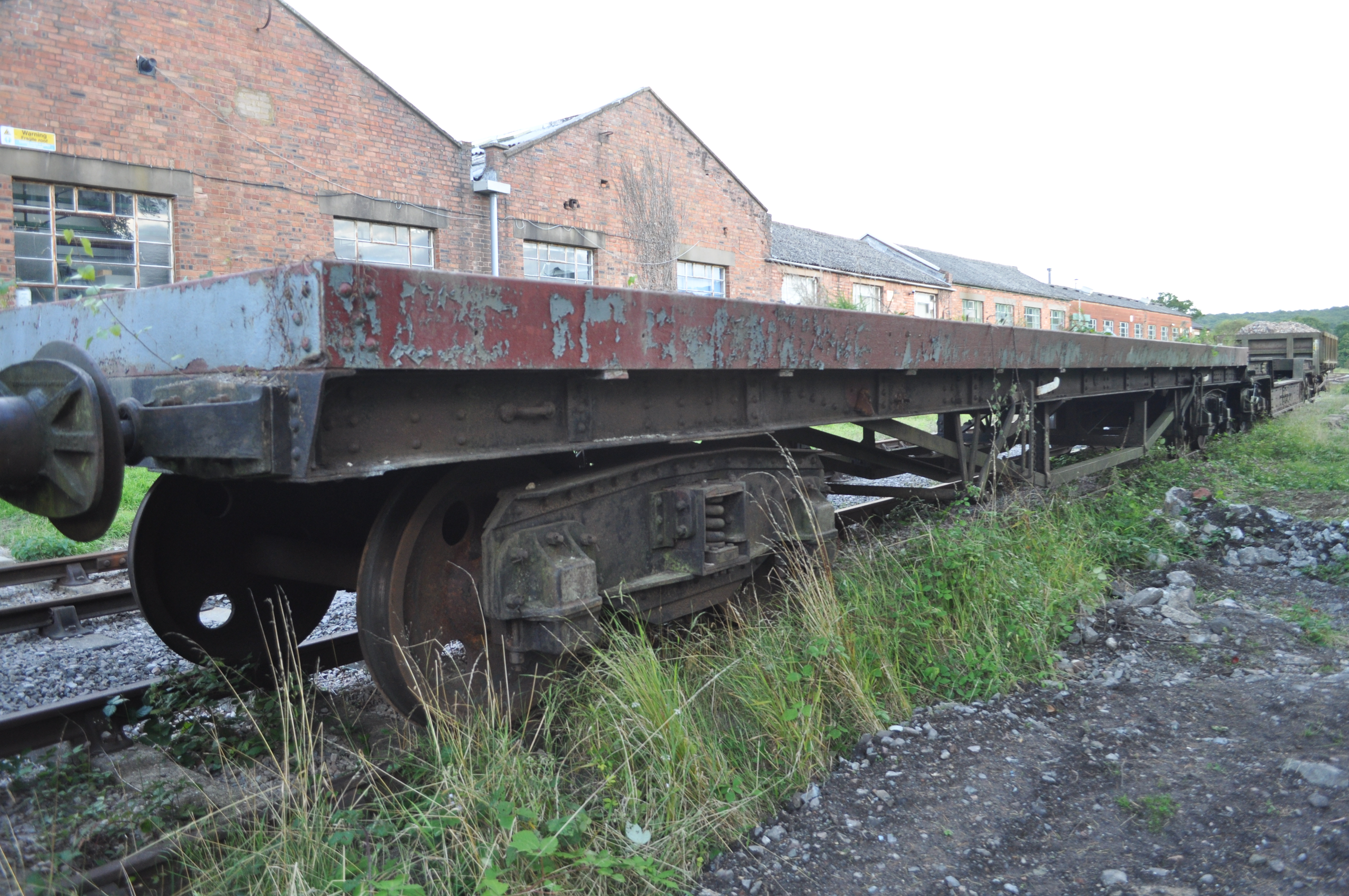
'Bobol D' at the Dean Forest Railway

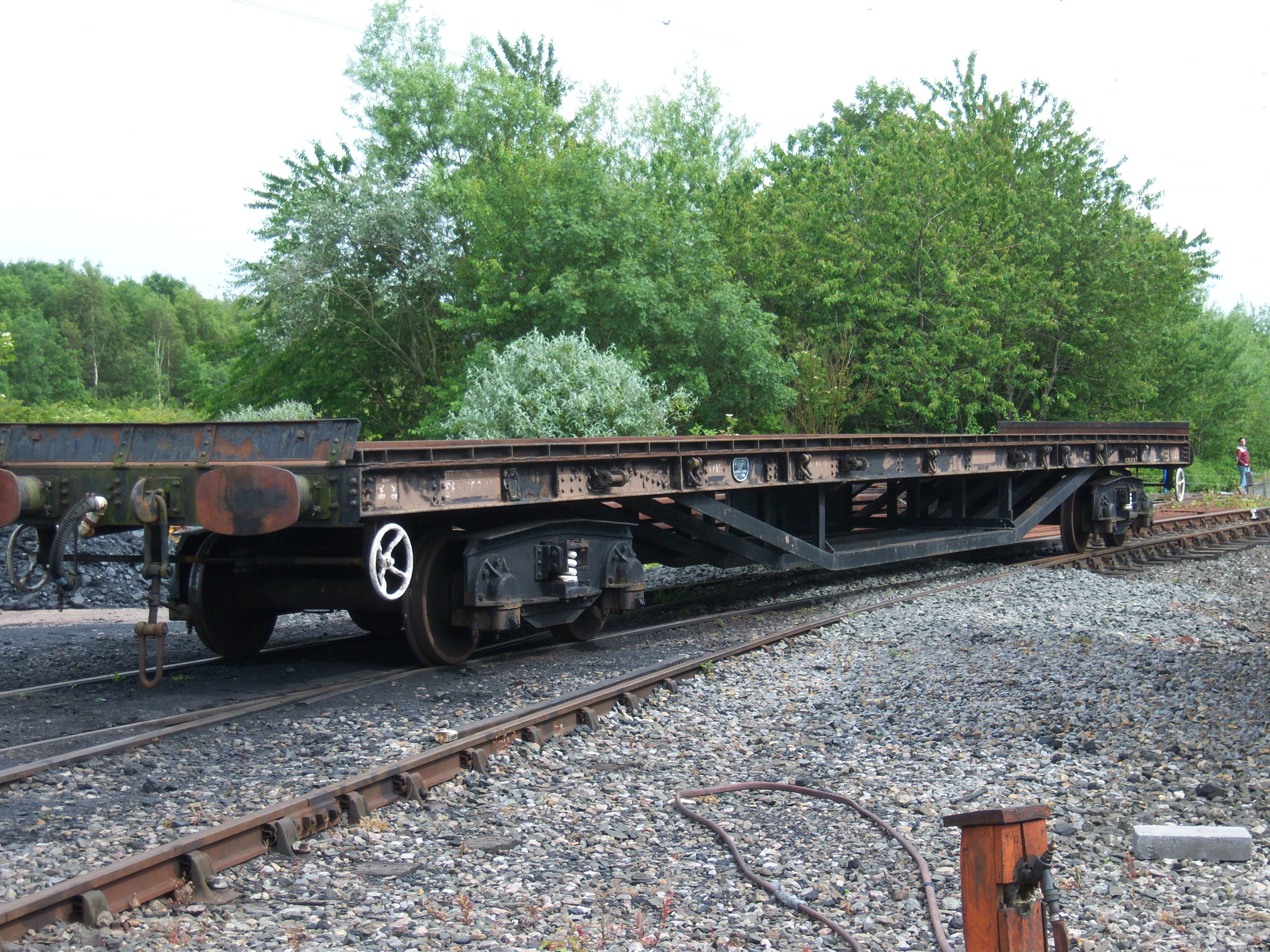
'Salmon' at the North Tyneside Railway

A bogie bolster has both bogies and bolsters.

Bogies are four-wheeled, articulated carriages beneath the main load bed. They allow a long wagon to carry long loads, but still have individually short wheelbases, and so go round tight curves.

Bolsters are baulks of timber fixed across the bed. The bed is thus not flat, but most loads such as girders, rails, timber lengths, signal posts etc. are stiff enough that they only need to be supported at intervals, not continuously across a flat planked bed. The space between baulks allows room for tie-down chains or lifting straps, making the bolster design easier to work with than a completely flat bed.

Bolsters could be fixed in place, or be removable. Some had as many as five bolsters. Some designs had multiple sockets and a pair of bolsters could be moved between them. The bolsters could even be allowed to swivel around a central locating pin, and curved steel rubbing strips on the wagon deck. The design of bogie bolster wagons had developed from earlier timber wagons, which were short four-wheeled wagons, each carrying a single swivelling bolster. A pair of such wagons could carry a large tree trunk to a sawmill, but they required either the tree to take the full tension of the train, (Note: This was sometimes done on narrow-gauge forestry railways) or a suitable number of match wagons to be marshalled between the two bolster wagons. The long, but relatively lightweight, bogie bolster replaced that arrangement with a single wagon.

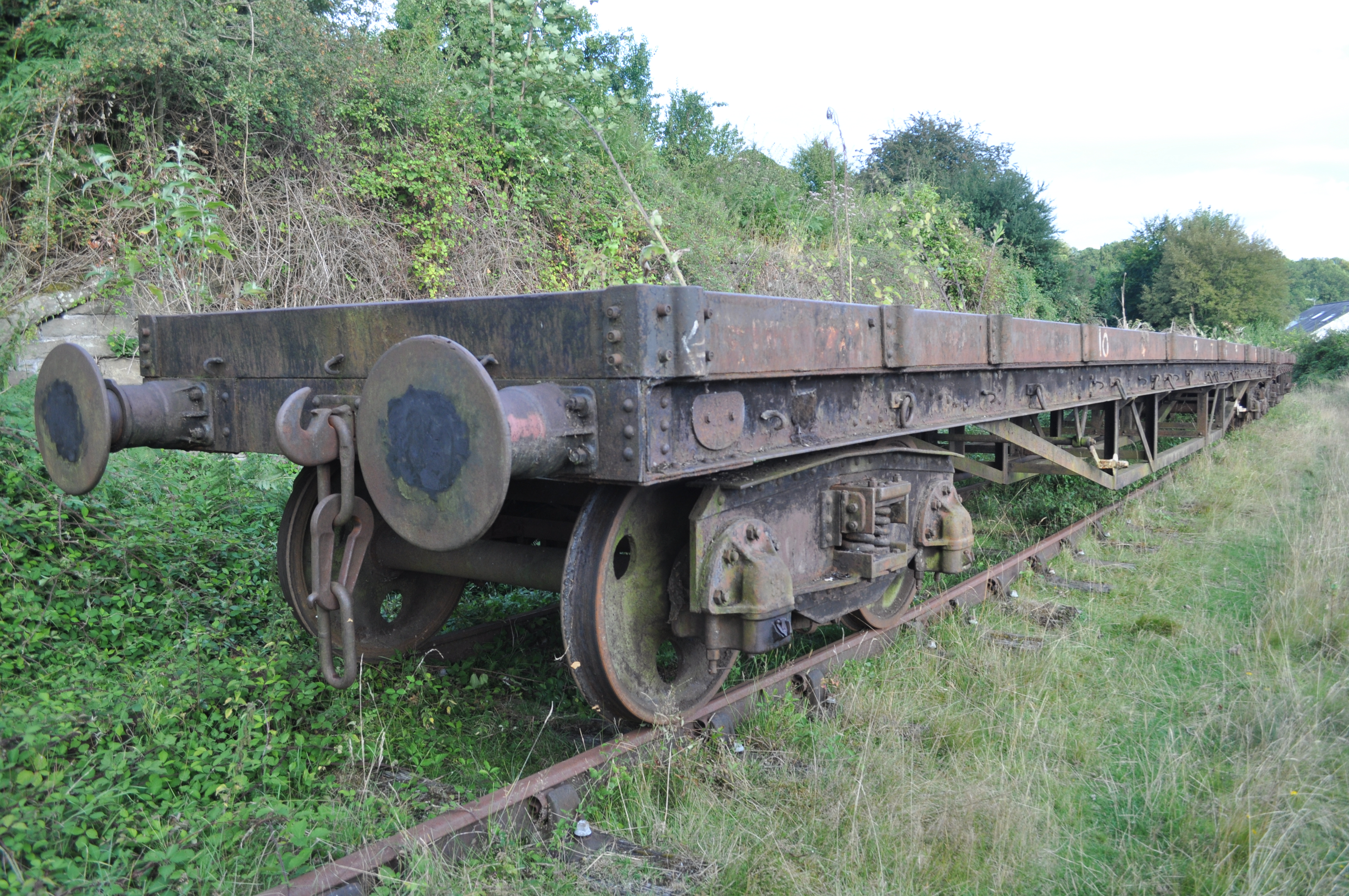
Most designs also had "stakes", which are removable vertical steel bars to restrain a load from rolling or sliding sideways. They could be either fixed through the bolsters, or inserted into pockets along the edge girders of the wagon body. (Note: See the 'Gane A' illustration for visible, but empty, pockets)

Bolster wagons are relatively lightweight. Heavier well wagons, used for machinery loads, had deeper and stronger side girders. They had a cranked side profile, so that the centre of gravity was of the load was lower. Bogie bolsters could carry typical loads of 15 or 30 long tons (16.8 or 33.6 short tons; 15.2 or 30.5 t).

The GWR telegraphic code word for a bogie bolster was 'Macaw'. Other codes for specific types were 'Beaver' or 'Gane'.

== Rail wagons ==
Bogie bolsters were particularly useful for permanent way loads, such as rail. Many such wagons were not part of the railway's commercial stock, but were included as part of departmental stock (stock used for engineering works on the railway itself).

Codes for these wagons included 'Salmon', Bobol and 'Gane'

A number of bogie bolsters have been preserved on British heritage railways, as they are convenient for moving rails, telegraph poles and other permanent way loads.

== See also ==
- Skeleton car (US)
- Truck bolster
