= GWR Siphon =

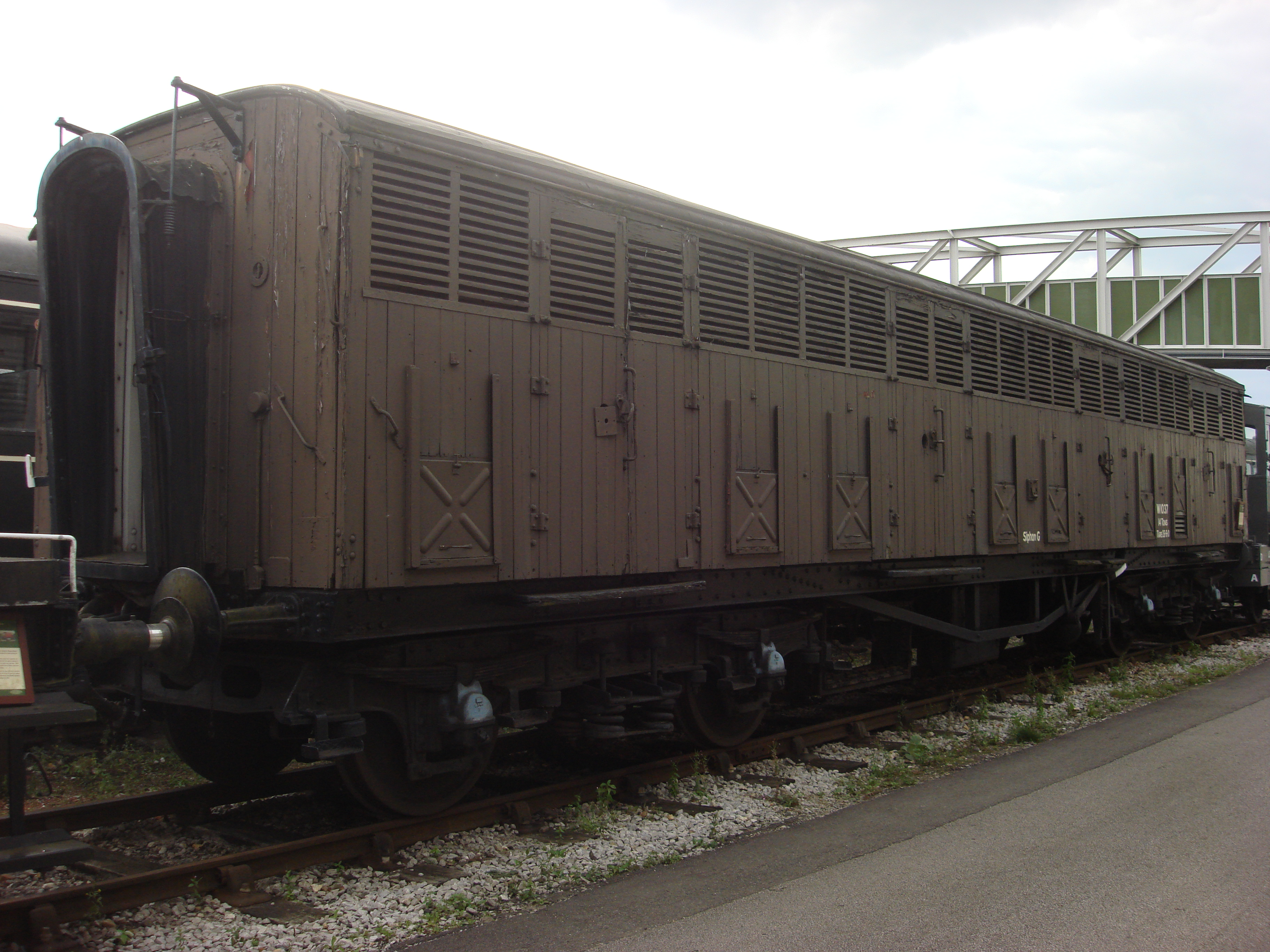
GWR Siphon G, built by British Railways in 1955

The GWR Siphon was a series of enclosed milk churn transport wagons built by the Great Western Railway and continued by British Railways.

== Background ==
The GWR, being a railway system which served the rural and highly agricultural West of England and South Wales, had a resultant large requirement to transport milk in volume. Post grouping in 1923, of the 282 million gallons of milk transported by rail by all four national railways companies, the GWR had the largest share of milk traffic, followed by the LMS, the Southern (particularly from the Somerset and Dorset Joint Railway) and finally the LNER from East Anglia.

Often, the milk was delivered direct from the farmer to the local railway station in milk churns. So to remove the need for moving unprocessed milk from one container to another, and hence potential cross contamination or need for the GWR to install hygienic washing facilities, the decision was taken to transport the milk churns.

== Versions ==
The first Siphons - named after the GWR's Telegraphic code for a milk wagon - appeared from Swindon Works in the 1870s, later given diagram O.1. 75 wagons were built to this diagram under lot numbers 180 and 217, able to carry 17 gallon milk churns stacked two high. This first design was removed from traffic by the outbreak of World War I.

These early Siphons set the key design precedents for their later larger successors:

- All wooden body construction, keeping construction costs low and repairs simple
- Ventilated to some extent, with additional flaps
- Canvas roof

The first design, like many later Siphons, was constructed on recycled chassis from earlier passenger carriage designs, and hence all Siphon variants were not designated goods wagons, but carriages.

The Siphon C was a development introduced from 1906. This had more enclosure, but also bigger vents at higher level. The Siphon E was the first vehicle to use a tri-axle arrangement, introduced from post World War I they were withdrawn from the late 1930s as train speeds increased.

The most populous version was the Siphon G, which sat on a classic passenger carriage double-bogied chassis of 50 feet (15 m) in length, derived from a strengthened passenger carriage variant. 130 vehicles were built to Diagram 0.21 between 1913 and 1927. All survived into British Railways ownership, the first withdrawn in 1954, the last in 1962. The first to diagram O.22 were built from 1927.

The last version was the Siphon J. By the 1930s, the milk companies wanted to be able to assure better quality, and so had requested chilled delivery vehicles. Having experimented with a chilled MICA van using frozen carbon dioxide (dry ice), the 1930s introduced Siphon J was a fully enclosed and chilled by dry ice milk churn transport wagon.

== Usage ==
Siphons were most commonly attached to the rear of passenger trains, due to the need to quickly transport the enclosed milk from farmer to the milk processing facility in the shortest possible timescale. Often Siphons travelled singly, although on the most used routes from Devon and West Wales to Paddington railway station, express milk trains were scheduled.

After World War II, the milk companies began to use road transport to move milk direct from the farm to their dairy processing units. This resulted in the earlier Siphons being fully withdrawn, and the later dual-bogie versions being used to transport parcels, after they had been fully sealed and their vents closed. After the introduction of specialised parcels vehicles, the Siphons were often used by the engineers department, with ENPARTS in large letters on the side transporting spares around the system.

== Preservation ==
Many preserved versions of the later Siphon G can be found on many heritage railways in the United Kingdom. No.2775 of 1937 (DW150028) is preserved within the National Collection, currently located at Shildon Locomotion Museum.
