= Telegraphic address =

Unique identifier code for a recipient of telegraph messages

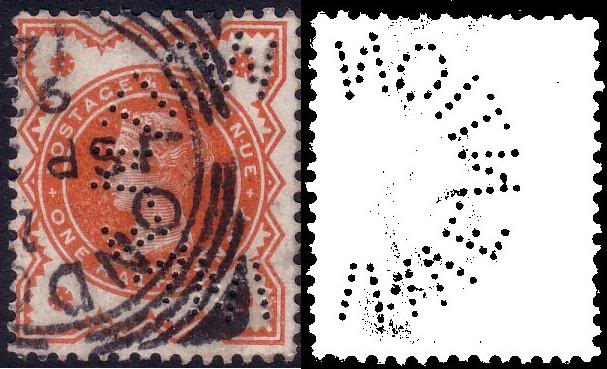
The telegraphic address of Patent agents G.F. Redfern & Co. of London was the name INVENTION as perforated on stamps used by the company on this circa 1900 stamp.

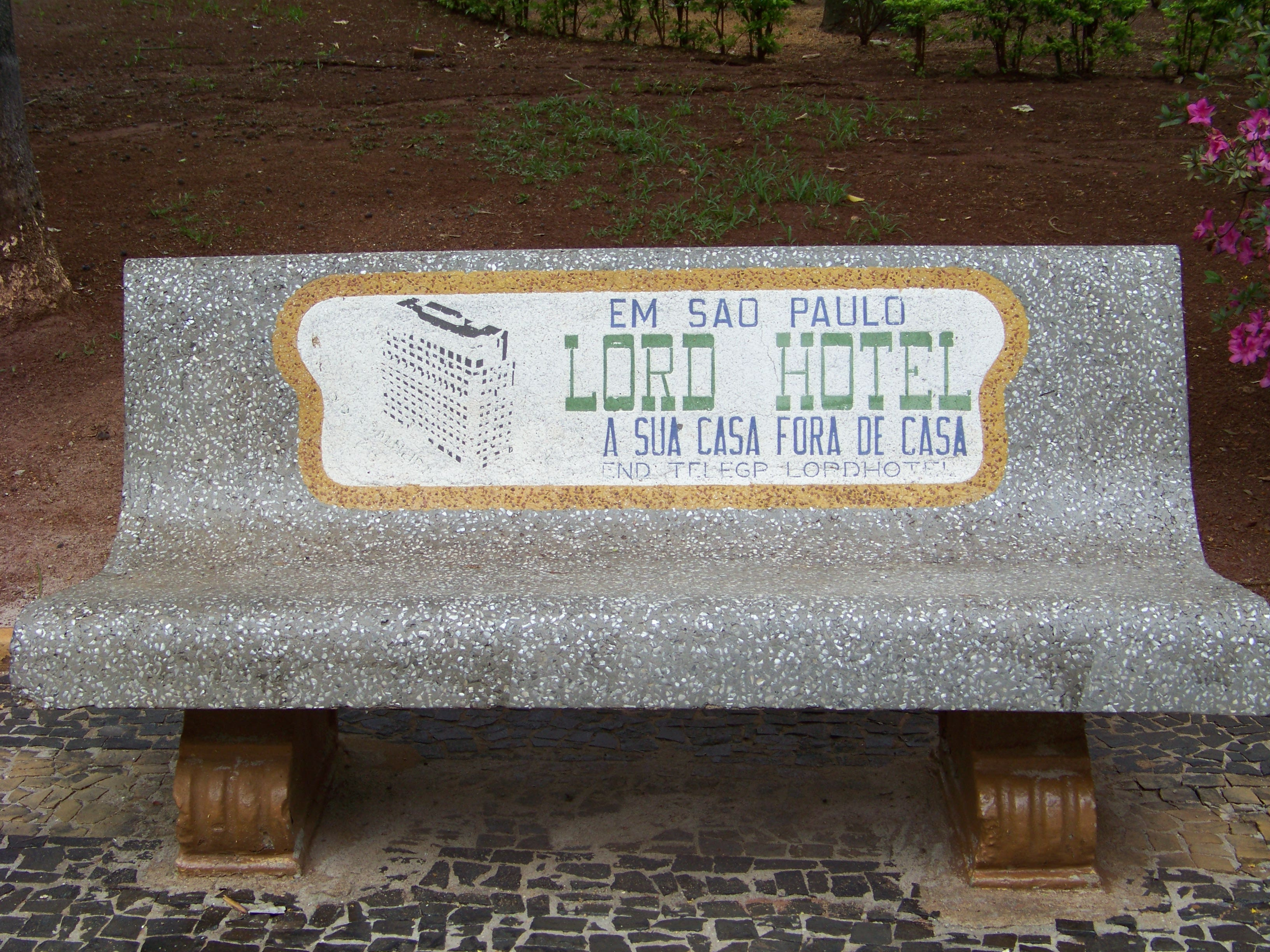
A sponsored park bench in Pirassununga, Brazil. The sponsor was a hotel from São Paulo, advertising itself as "Your home away from home" and informing the telegraphic address LORDHOTEL

A telegraphic address or cable address was a unique identifier code for a recipient of telegraph messages. Operators of telegraph services regulated the use of telegraphic addresses to prevent duplication. Rather like a uniform resource locator (URL), the telegraphic address did not contain any routing information (aside from possibly a city name), but instead could be looked up by telegraph office personnel, who would then manually direct the message to the office nearest the destination or to an intermediate office. Since the destination address of a telegram counted as part of the message, using a short registered address code saved the expense of sending a complete street address. Telegraphic addresses were chosen either as versions of a company's name or as a memorable short word somehow associated with the recipient. Occasionally, an organization would come to be best known by its telegraphic address, for example Interflora, Interpol and Oxfam. A telegraphic address was a valuable part of a company's corporate identity, and disputes sometimes arose when a competitor registered a telegraphic address similar to a trade name or identifier used by a rival.

== See also ==
- Australian railway telegraphic codes
- Nodename
- Short code
- Telegraph code
- Telex
