= Great Western Railway telegraphic codes =

Commercial telegraph code

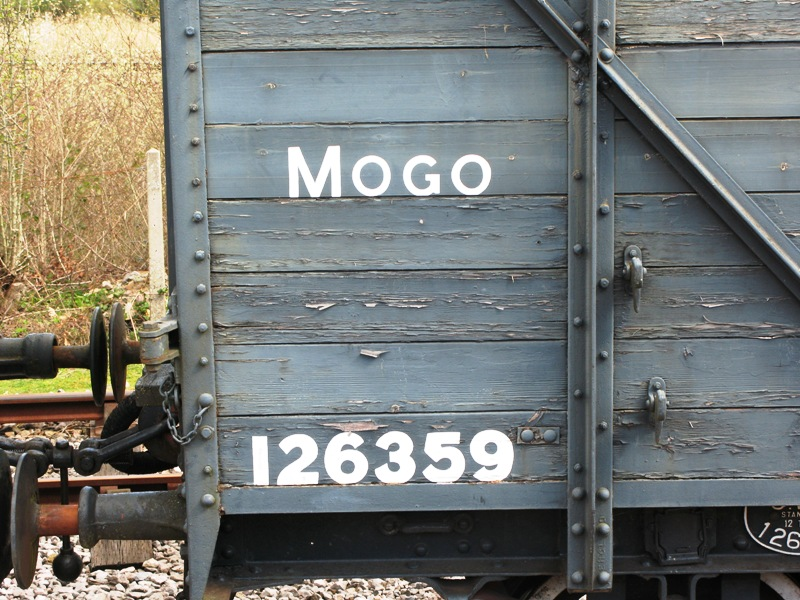
A telegraphic code painted on a Mogo (Motor car goods van)

Great Western Railway telegraphic codes were a commercial telegraph code used to shorten the telegraphic messages sent between the stations and offices of the railway.

The codes listed below are taken from the 1939 edition of the Telegraph Message Code book unless stated otherwise.

== History ==
The Great Western Railway (GWR) pioneered telegraph communication over the 13 miles (21 km) from Paddington to West Drayton on 9 April 1839 using the Cooke and Wheatstone telegraph equipment. Although this early system fell into disuse after a few years, from 1850 a new contract with the Electric Telegraph Company saw double-needle telegraphs working at most stations on the line; these were replaced by single-needle machines from 1860. Although used primarily as a safety device to regulate the passage of trains, it was also used to pass messages between the staff. In order to do this quickly and accurately, a number of code words were used to replace complicated or regularly used phrases. The codes were changed from time to time to reflect current needs.

By 1922 most railways in the country had agreed on standard code words, although the GWR had an extended list of codes that could only be used within its own network. In 1943 all railways were brought into a single system of codes and the GWR special codes were discontinued.

== Wagons ==
Note: many of these codes could have an extra letter to identify variations, such as Mink A (a 16 ft (4.9 m) ventilated van), or Mink G (a 21 ft (6.4 m) ordinary van). Most of these codes were painted onto the wagons for easy identification.

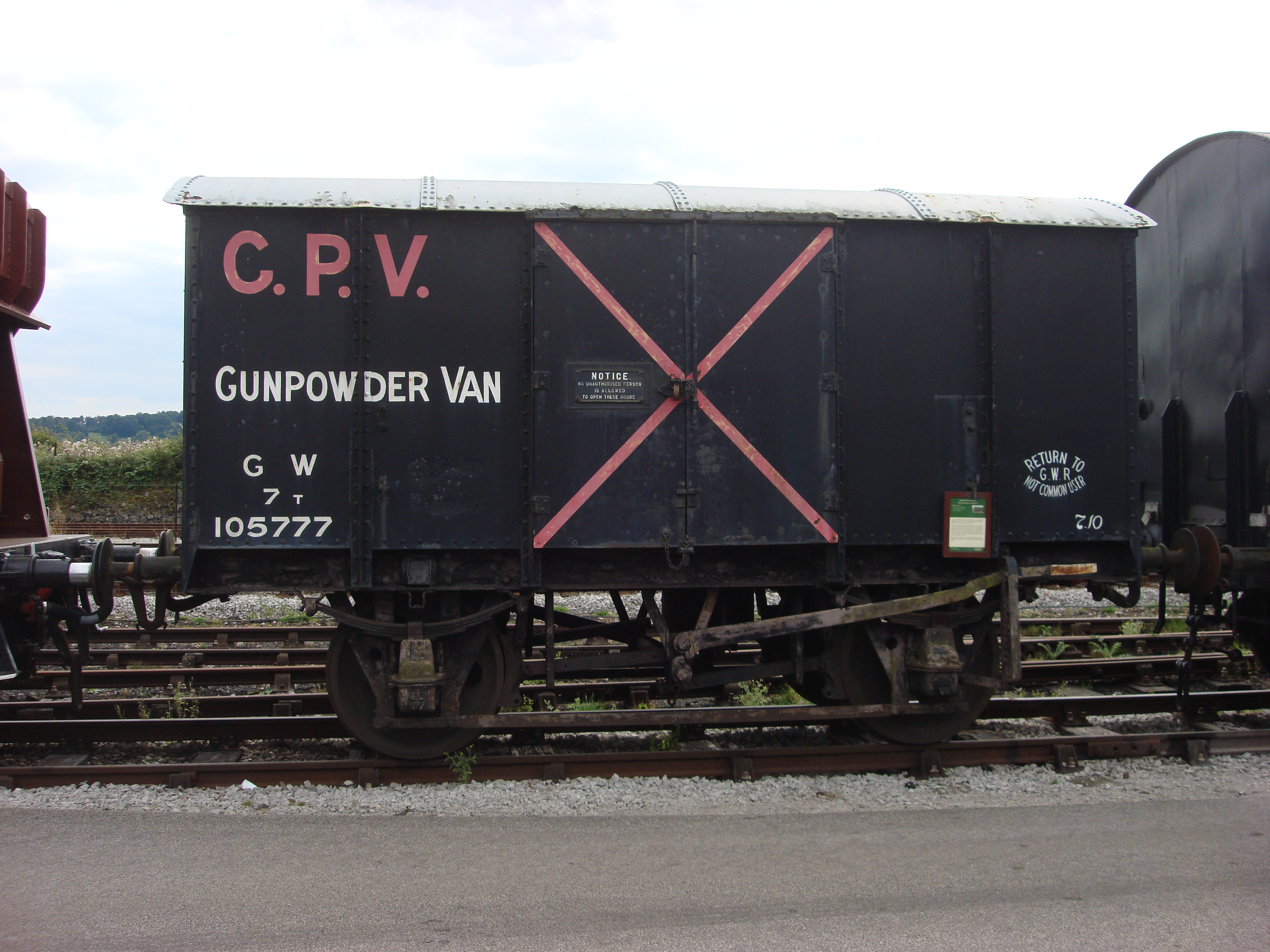
Cone

- Aero – airscrew wagon (from 1941)
- Ale – cattle wagon converted for beer barrels (from 1940)
- Asmo – covered motor car truck
- Beaver – flat truck
- Beetle – prize cattle wagon.
- Bloater – large fish van
- Bocar – covered truck for car bodies
- Cone – gunpowder van
- Conflat – flat wagon for containers
- Coral – glass wagon
- Cordon – gas reservoir truck
- Covcar – covered carriage truck
- Crocodile – well trolley

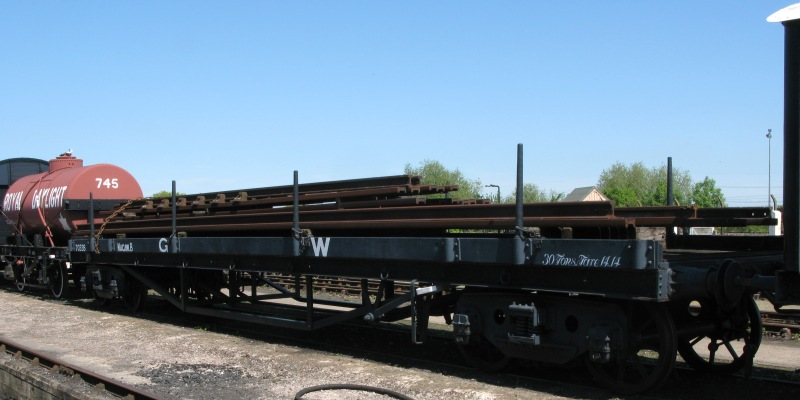
Macaw

- Damo – covered motor car truck
- Fruit – fruit van
- Gadfly – aeroplane truck
- Gane – engineers rail truck
- Grano – covered grain hopper
- Hydra – passenger rated well truck
- Loriot – machine truck
- Macaw – timber truck
- Mayfly – transformer truck

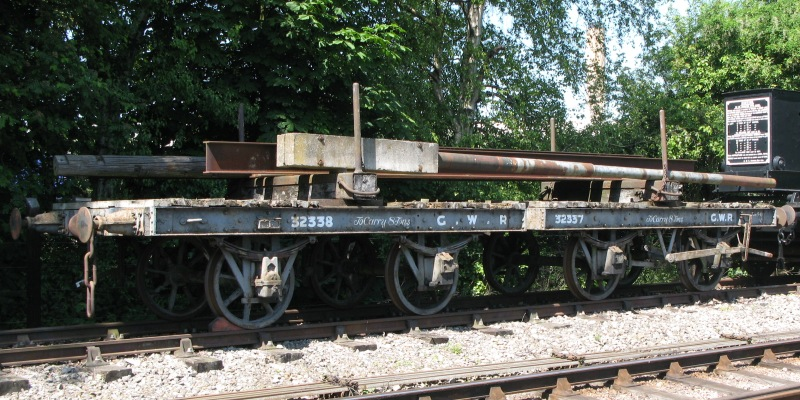
Mite

- Mex – ordinary cattle wagon
- Mica – meat van
- Mink – covered goods van
- Milta – milk tank
- Mite – twin timber trucks
- Mogo – covered motor car wagon
- Morel – propeller truck
- Open – open wagon
- Parto – covered van with movable partitions

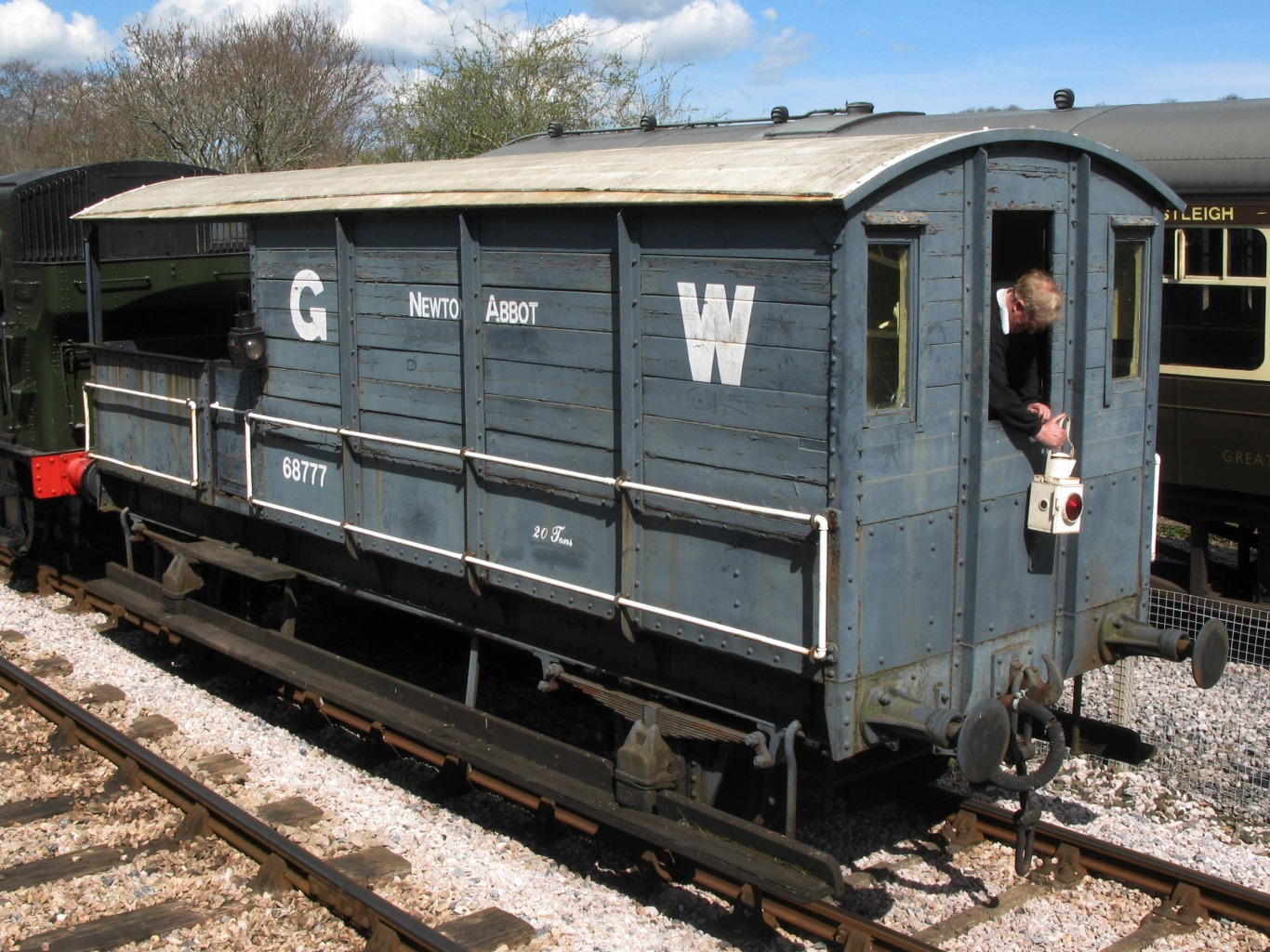
GWR Toad brake van

- Pollen – girder or boiler truck
- Rectank – trolley for machinery.
- Roder – flat truck for road vehicles (to 1935)
- Rotruck – road-rail truck for milk tanks
- Serpent – carriage truck
- Tadpole – open fish wagon
- Tevan – converted Mica for special traffic
- Toad – goods brake van, which became the standard designs nickname
- Totem – armour plate and girder wagon
- Tourn – eight-wheeled open (to 1934)

== Carriages ==
Note: many of these codes could have an extra letter to identify variations, such as Scorpion C (a 45 ft (14 m) carriage truck), or Scorpion D (a 21 ft (6.4 m) carriage truck).

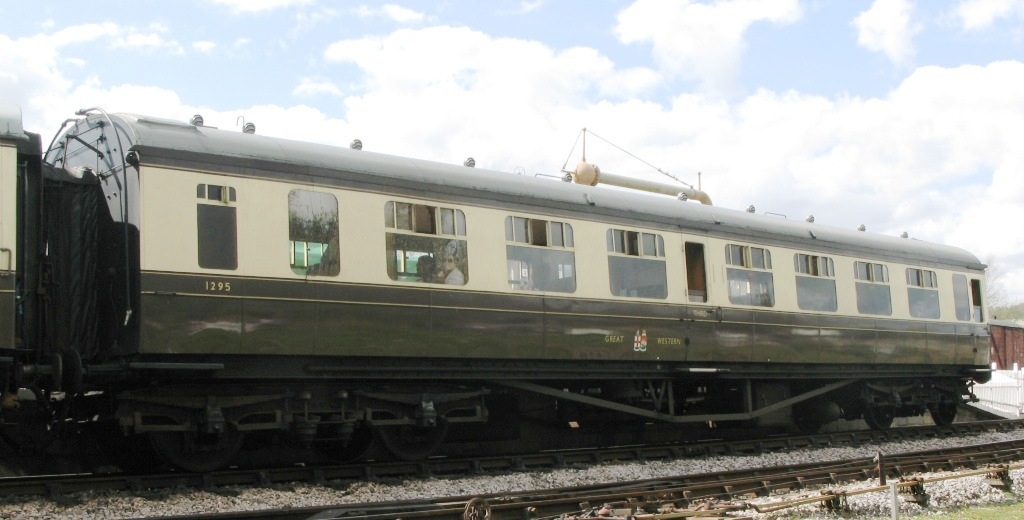
Chub

- Beetle – special cattle truck
- Bloater – covered fish truck
- Catox – cattle box
- Chafer – invalid carriage
- Chintz – family carriage
- Chub – third saloon
- Cricket – composite carriage
- Emmett – brake third carriage
- First – first class carriage
- Gnat – slip coach
- Goliath – bogie open scenery truck

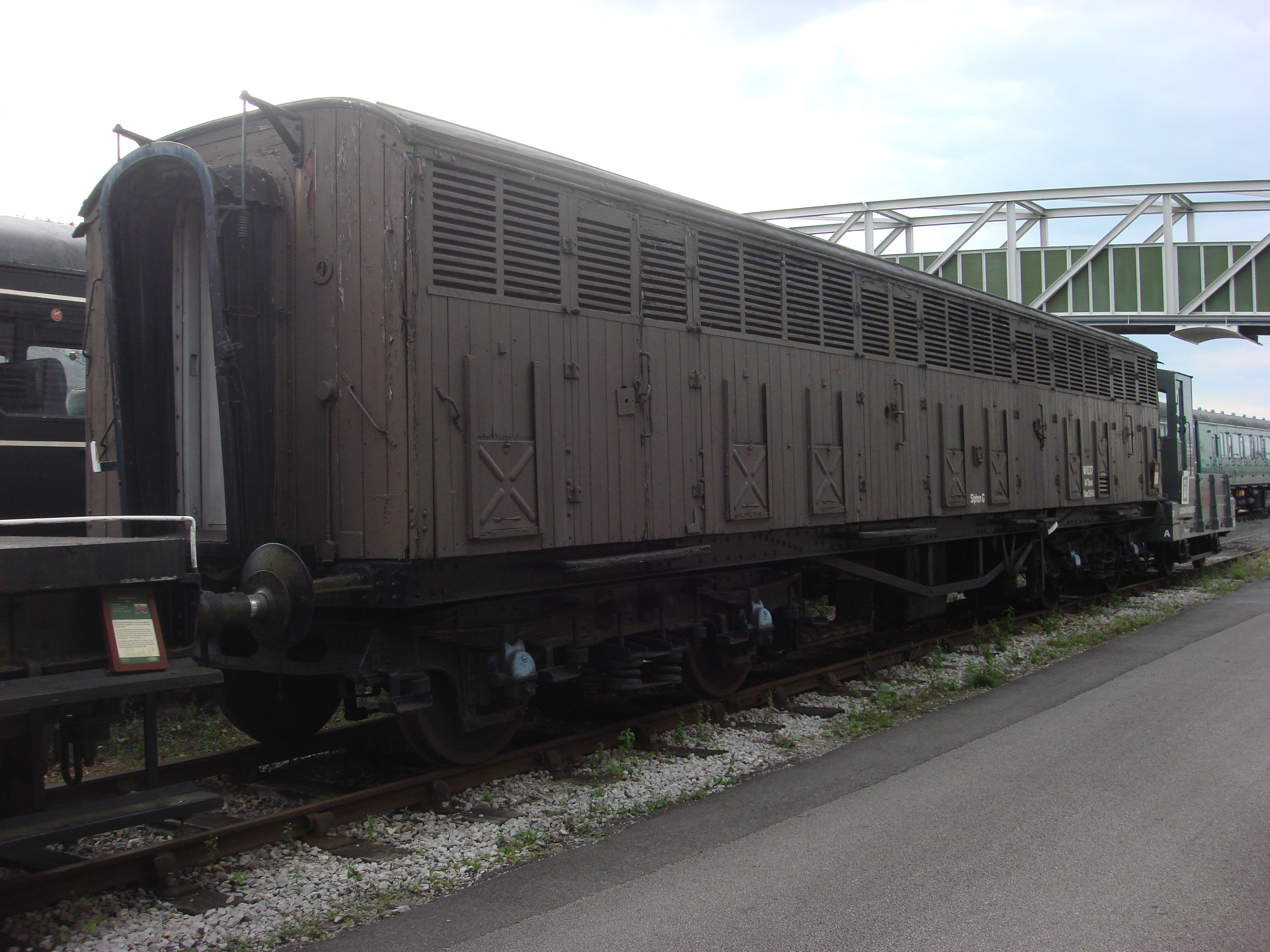
GWR Siphon G

- Hydra – well truck for road vehicles
- Melon – brake third carriage
- Mex – cattle wagon
- Monster – theatrical scenery truck
- Paco – horse box
- Python – covered carriage truck
- Scorpion – carriage truck
- Siphon – milk van
- Snake – passenger brake van
- Termite – third class carriage

== Road motor vehicles and trailers ==
- Brockhouse – 15 ton Brockhouse trailer
- Dido – four-wheeled trailer
- Dixton – 10 ton cartage motor vehicle
- Dyak – two-wheeled trailer
- Forton – 4 or 5 ton cartage motor vehicle
- Jason – tipping trailer
- Lydus – pipe trailer
- Mentor – six-wheeled trailer
- Nico – cattle trailer
- Numa – container trailer
- Sixate – 6 or 8 ton cartage motor vehicle
- Toner – 1 or 1½ ton cartage motor vehicle
- Tooton – 2 ton cartage motor vehicle
- Vibo – timber trailer

== Standard phrases ==
The 1939 Telegraph Message Code book contains in excess of 900 code words (around half of which were standard codes also used by other railways) yet very few were the familiar codes seen painted on the side of goods wagons. By using these codes long and complex sentences could be sent using just a few words. Some examples of the codes representing phrases include:

- Adex – Advertised day excursion.
- Boyne – There is no water at the following station. Instruct drivers.
- Chicory – Cannot trace delivery. Wire full description, marks, and contents, and say who complains.
- Cynic – Can only offer ordinary service. Wire what decided.
- Earwig – Following urgently wanted.
- Lough – Shunting horse ill. Send relief.
- Osage – Send men here for undermentioned engine to leave at ...
- Palm – Report fully by next train with reference to delay.
- Smoke – Owing to fog in London Division restriction train service to operate in accordance with current fog-working notice.
- Stork – We have no trace of your invoice; send copy next train.
- Zola – Can you send engine and men to undermentioned station? If so, state time leaving.

== See also ==
- Australian railway telegraphic codes
- Commercial code
- Great Western Railway wagons
