= Milk churn =

Tall metal container to transport milk

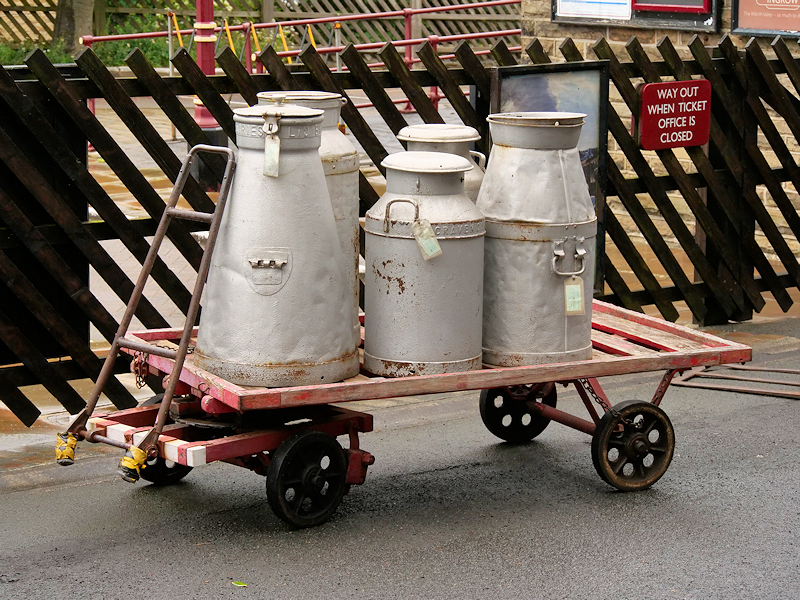
Milk churns on a railway platform

A milk churn is a tall, conical or cylindrical container for the transportation of milk. In North America, it is often referred to as a milk can.

== History ==
The milk churn is named from its physical resemblance to the upright type of butter churn. Whereas the butter churn which was fitted with a plunger for churning the milk into butter, the milk churn lacked a plunger and so, despite its name, was not used for churning. The milk churn was also known as the milk kit in Northern England or a tankard in the Welsh Marches. The 12-gallon steel churns were later replaced with 10-gallon aluminium alloy churns. The lid had a small hole in its outer rim for tying the producer’s label on.

== Milk churn stands ==
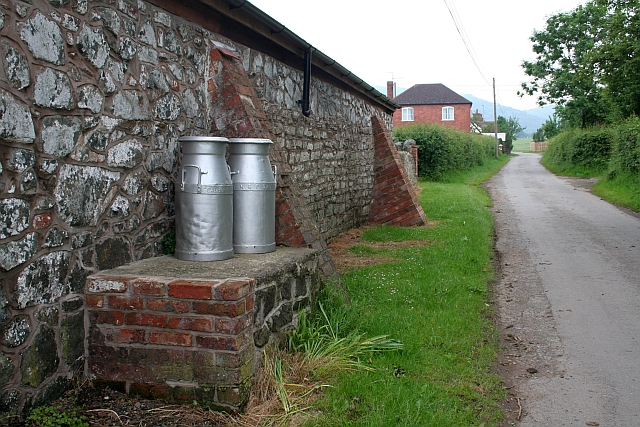
Milk churns on stand by road

In Britain, Ireland and other European countries, milk churns would be left by dairy farmers by the roadside on purpose-built platforms, or stands, at the right height to be loaded on to the dairy's cart or lorry. They fell out of use when milk began to be collected by tanker from the farm and ceased entirely by 1979. Some stands remain in the countryside as historical features, but most have been dismantled or left to decay.
