= George of Duklja =

George of Duklja or Đorđe of Duklja may refer to:

- George I of Duklja, from the Vojislavljević dynasty, King of Duklja (1113–1118) and again (1125–1131)
- George II of Duklja, from the Nemanjić dynasty, titular King, and Prince of Duklja from 1208 to c. 1243

== See also ==
- George I (disambiguation)
- George II (disambiguation)
- Michael of Duklja (disambiguation)
- Vladimir of Duklja (disambiguation)
- Duklja
