= George V (disambiguation) =

George V (1865–1936) was king of the United Kingdom and its dominions from 1910 to 1936.

George V may also refer to:

== People ==
- George V of Georgia (c. 1286 – 1346)
- George V of Imereti, King of Imereti (western Georgia) from 1702 to 1707
- George V of Hanover (1819–1878), last king of Hanover
- George V of Armenia (1847–1930), catholicos of the Armenian church
- Ignatius George V Shelhot, Syriac Catholic Patriarch of Antioch (1874–1891)

== Docks ==
- King George V Dock, Glasgow
- King George V Dock, London
- King George V Dock, Hull

== Places ==
- George V Coast, Antarctica
- King George V Park, Newfoundland, Canada
- King George V Memorial Park, Hong Kong

== Rail ==
- LNWR George the Fifth Class
- GWR no. 6000 King George V
- George V station, a Paris Metro station
- King George V DLR station, London, UK

== Schools and colleges ==
- SMK King George V, Malaysia
- King George V College, UK
- King George V School, Hong Kong

== Ships ==
- HMS King George V (1911), a battleship
  - King George V-class battleship (1911)
- HMS King George V (41), a battleship
  - King George V-class battleship (1939)
- TS King George V, a turbine steamer

== Other uses ==
- King George V Memorial Hospital, a hospital in New South Wales, Australia
- Hotel George V, Paris, a hotel in France
- George V Bridge, Orléans, a bridge in France

== See also ==
- King George (disambiguation)
- King George School (disambiguation)
- King George V School (disambiguation)
- King George Square, Brisbane, Australia
- King George Stakes, a UK horse race
- King George Street (disambiguation)
- KGV (disambiguation)
- KGV Oval, Tasmania, Australia
- George Tupou V (1948–2012), King of Tonga from 2006 to 2012
