= George VII =

George VII may refer to:

- George VII of Georgia (died 1405 or 1407)
- George VII of Imereti (1718–1778)

== Fictional characters ==
- King of the United Kingdom from 1963 in Columbia & Britannia by Adam Chamberlain and Brian A. Dixon
- George VII, second son of Victoria II, in Long Live The King by John Rowe
- A king in the tabletop science fantasy role playing game Shadowrun

== See also ==
- Prince George of Wales (born 2013), possible future regnal name
- King George (disambiguation)
