= GWR 6000 Class 6024 King Edward I =

Antique British steam locomotive

King Edward I
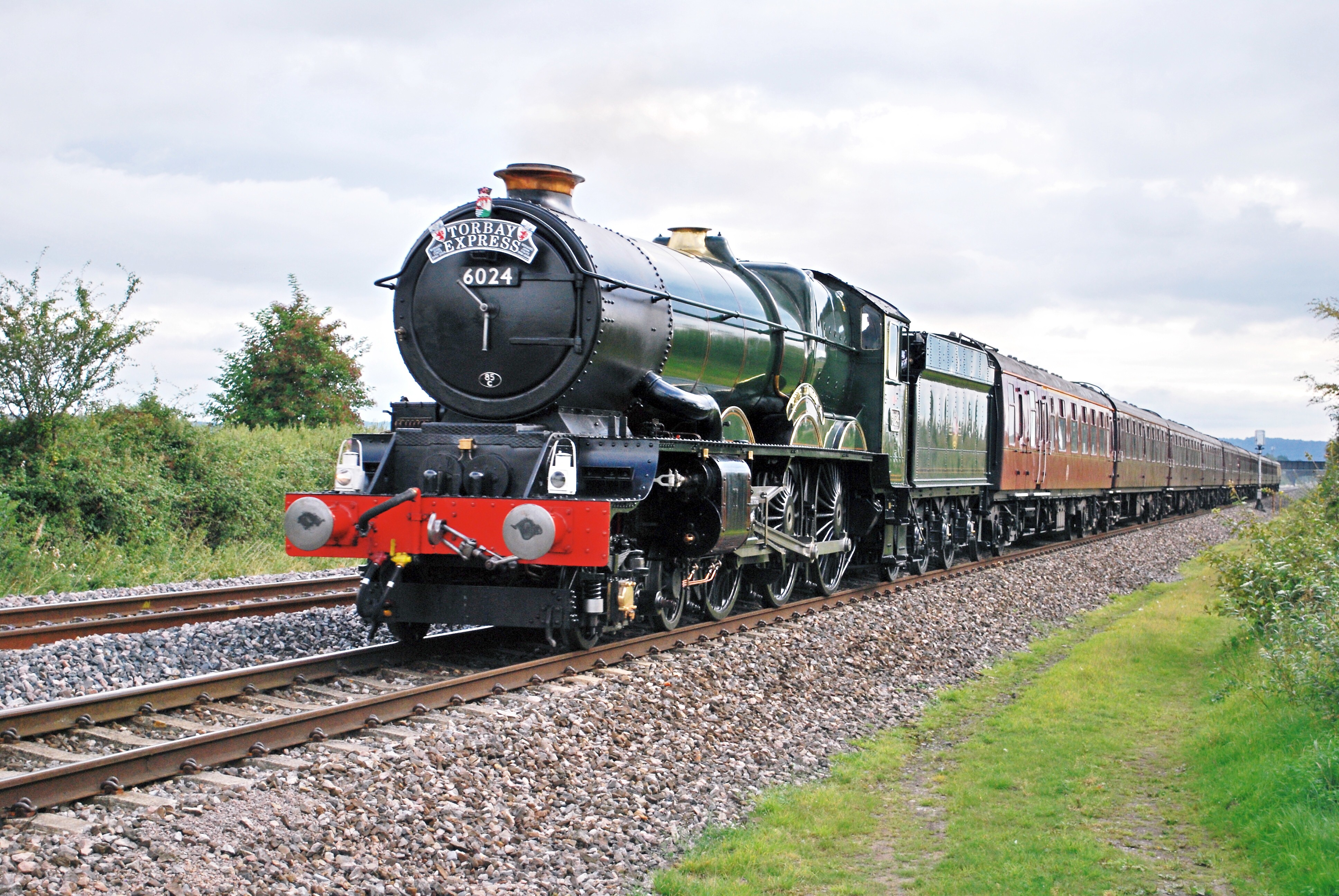
- 6024 King Edward I approaching Yatton on the Bristol Temple Meads - Paignton "Torbay Express"
Type and origin
- Power type: Steam
- Builder: Great Western Railway, Swindon Works
- Build date: June 1930
Specifications
- Configuration
  - Whyte: 4-6-0
  - UIC: 2′C h4
- Gauge: 4 ft 8 1/2 in (1,435 mm) standard gauge
- Leading dia.: 3 ft 0 in (0.914 m)
- Driver dia.: 6 ft 6 in (1.981 m)
- Minimum curve: 8 chains (530 ft; 160 m) normal, 7 chains (460 ft; 140 m) slow
- Length: 68 ft 2 in (20.78 m) over buffers
- Width: 8 ft 11 1/2 in (2.731 m)
- Height: 13 ft 4 3/4 in (4.083 m)
- Axle load: 22 long tons 10 cwt (50,400 lb or 22.9 t) (25.2 short tons) full
- Adhesive weight: 67 long tons 10 cwt (151,200 lb or 68.6 t) (75.6 short tons) full
- Loco weight: 89 long tons 0 cwt (199,400 lb or 90.4 t) (99.7 short tons) full
- Tender weight: 46 long tons 14 cwt (104,600 lb or 47.4 t) (51.2 short tons) full
- Total weight: 135 long tons 14 cwt (304,000 lb or 137.9 t) (152.0 short tons)
- Fuel type: Coal
- Fuel capacity: 6 long tons 0 cwt (13,400 lb or 6.1 t) (6.7 short tons)
- Water cap.: 4,000 imp gal (18,000 L; 4,800 US gal)
- Boiler: GWR Standard No. 12
- Boiler pressure: 250 lbf/in^{2} (1.72 MPa)
- Cylinders: Four: two inside, two outside
- Cylinder size: 16 1/4 in × 28 in (413 mm × 711 mm)
- Valve gear: Inside cylinders: Walschaerts; Outside cylinders: derived from inside cylinders via rocking bars
Performance figures
- Tractive effort: 40,300 lbf (179.3 kN) original, 39,700 lbf (176.6 kN) after 1st overhaul
Career
- Operators: Great Western Railway; British Railways
- Class: King
- Number in class: 30
- Numbers: 6024
- Official name: King Edward I
- Locale: Western Region
- Retired: June 1962
- Current owner: Royal Scot Locomotive and General Trust
- Disposition: Operational, mainline certified

6024 King Edward I is a preserved Great Western Railway (GWR) 6000 Class steam locomotive operated from 1930 to 1962 by the Great Western Railway and latterly British Railways hauling express passenger services.

After withdrawal, it was sent to Woodham Brothers scrapyard in Barry, South Wales, where it remained for a number of years before being bought for preservation. It returned to steam in 1989 and has since been certified for mainline running. The locomotive is currently undergoing a 10 yearly major overhaul to mainline running condition.

== GWR/BR Operation ==
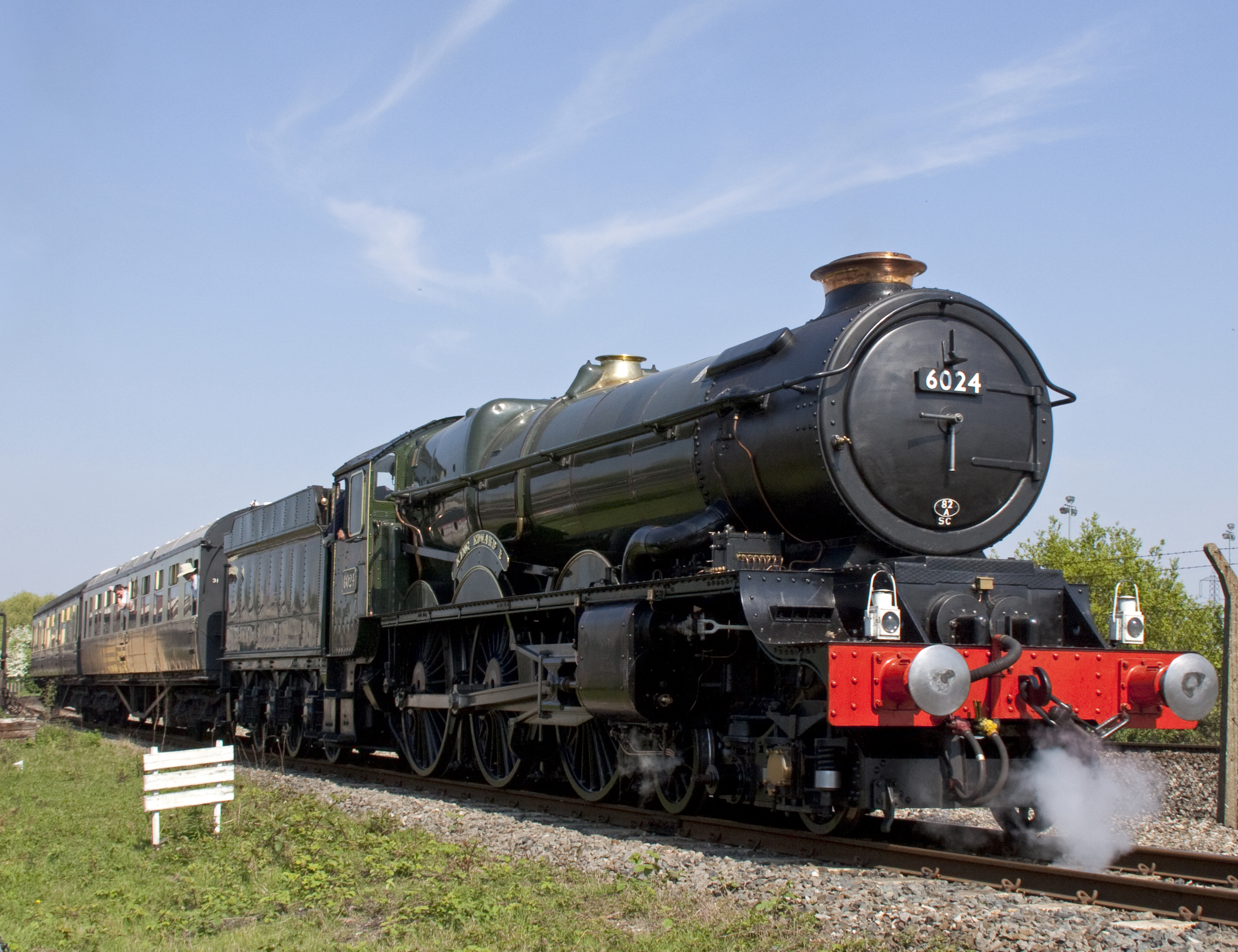
King Edward I at Didcot Railway Centre

Built at by the Great Western Railway's (GWR) Swindon Works in June 1930, for most of its working life it was allocated to Plymouth Laira. Transferred to Old Oak Common, London, in March 1959, and finally to Cardiff Canton TMD in 1962.

Sent to Swindon Works for breaking up, it had one final unusual task – coupled to its twin, 6023 King Edward II, it was towed over a bridge for weight testing purposes. Resultantly, with them now being closer to South Wales than Swindon, both locomotives survived and ended up being sold to Woodham Brothers scrapyard in Barry, South Wales, where they languished in the company of 300 other locomotives.

== Restoration ==
Inspired by preserved class-mate 6000 King George V's 1971 breach of British Rail's steam ban, in 1973 the King Preservation Society wanted to restore a locomotive to mainline condition. Both 6023 and 6024 were available for purchase, but 6024 was preferred because after a derailment in the Barry yard 6023 had had its rear driving wheels torched through, and at the time was considered beyond repair.

No 6024 was bought for £4,000 in 1974 but, like the other remaining locomotives, was missing significant components, including its double-chimney (currently fitted to No 6000) and its piston, connecting and eccentric rods; in addition its slide-bars had been cut through.

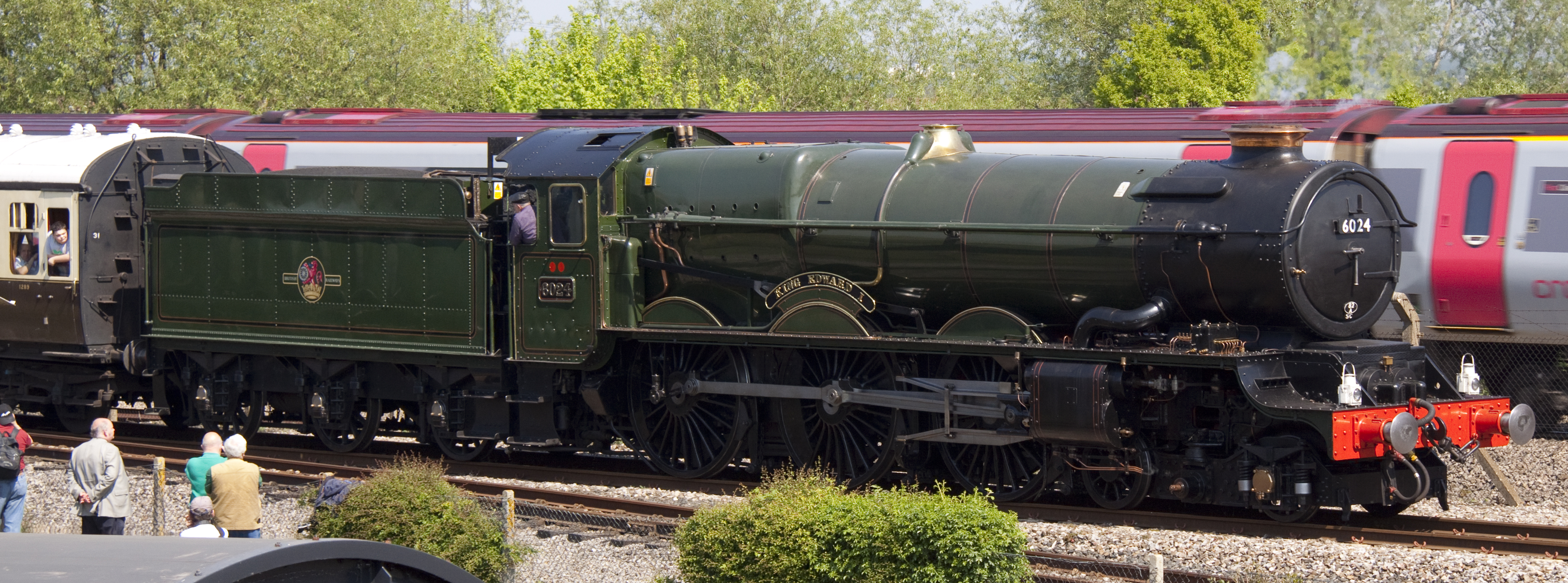
King Edward I at Didcot in 2011.

The 36th locomotive to be rescued from Barry, 6024 was moved to the Buckinghamshire Railway Centre at Quainton Road. On 2 February 1989, and after the creation of the Club100 funding initiative, 6024 moved again under its own power. It was re-commissioned on 26 April 1989 by the Duke of Gloucester. In October of that year the engine was moved by low-loader from Quainton Road to the Birmingham Railway Museum, from where it completed its mainline test runs. On 15 April 1990 it resumed its mainline career hauling revenue-earning passenger trains.

In recognition of the high standard to which the locomotive had been restored, 6024 was outright winner of the 1990 British Coal sponsored Heritage Award (for a restoration project using coal), and awarded a £3,000 prize which was put towards the restoration of a British Railways Mark 1 BSK coach for conversion to a support coach to accommodate support crew and equipment for mainline work.

== Mainline tours ==
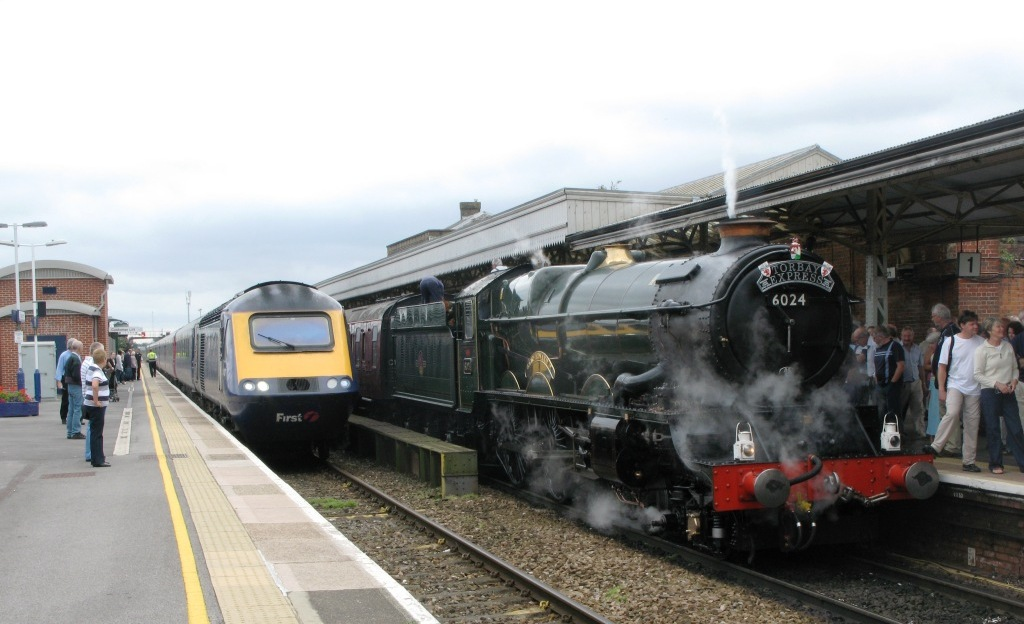
King Edward I is overtaken by a High Speed Train while taking water at Taunton while working a Torbay Express service.

The society was invited by British Rail to provide 6024 to haul the InterCity VIP special on 19 May 1990. In July 1990 it appeared at the National Railway Museum Exhibition on Tour which was held at Swindon Works, where it celebrated its 60th anniversary and was stabled alongside classmate 6000 King George V.

Affectionately nicknamed "Spud One" the locomotive was used for an expanding mainline tour programme, based at either Tyseley, Didcot or Hereford Railway Centre. In late 1991 the locomotive was invited to haul the "William Shakespeare Express" from London Paddington, its first appearance there for almost thirty years.

As open access to the national network brought more routes into play in early 1992, 6024 was increasingly seen hauling passenger charter trains on a number of previously banned routes, including the mainlines to the West of England via Bristol, and South Wales through the Severn Tunnel. Fitted with BR's standard Automatic Warning System (permitting speeds up to 75 mph), 6024 reintroduced steam-hauled express passenger trains to a number of new destinations within western zones for the first time for many years.

In August 1992 the locomotive made its promised return to Quainton Road, this time via the mainline, when in the company of 5029 Nunney Castle it hauled shuttles to and from Aylesbury. However, plans to take a train to Plymouth were thwarted by the locomotive's cab height preventing it from passing an over-bridge at Plympton.

== Modifications ==
After running almost 10,000 mainline miles, in March 1995 the locomotive was withdrawn from traffic for its heavy overhaul at the end of its mainline boiler certificate, and it retired to a secure Ministry of Defence site at Kineton in Warwickshire for the Society to carry out the work. In September 1996 it reappeared with a number of small but significant modifications, incorporated in order to make it more adaptable and to increase its availability.

The modifications included the fitting of dual-braking equipment (air and vacuum) to increase flexibility in the use of passenger rolling stock, and the reduction of its chimney, safety valves and cab-roof heights to permit it to fit within the standard loading gauge. This allowed it to make its return to Plymouth, first double-headed in November 1996, and then in April 1997 running solo. This was the first time an unassisted steam locomotive had been entrusted with a passenger train over the route since the early 1960s. In August 2002 6024 broke the record for steam haulage with the fastest modern-day time for the 52 miles from Plymouth to Exeter, in 58 minutes 6 seconds.

With a further 15,000 mainline miles on the clock, in October 2002 the locomotive was again withdrawn for its second major overhaul, which was being carried out by the Society within the site of Tyseley Locomotive Works. To keep pace with safety improvements, the locomotive was fitted with standard Train Protection & Warning System, and the society also completed its Water Wagon project for mainline trials. This will enable mainline water-stops to be avoided on certain routes. It returned to the mainline on 7 October 2004, on its third 7-year main line certificate.

== Royal train ==
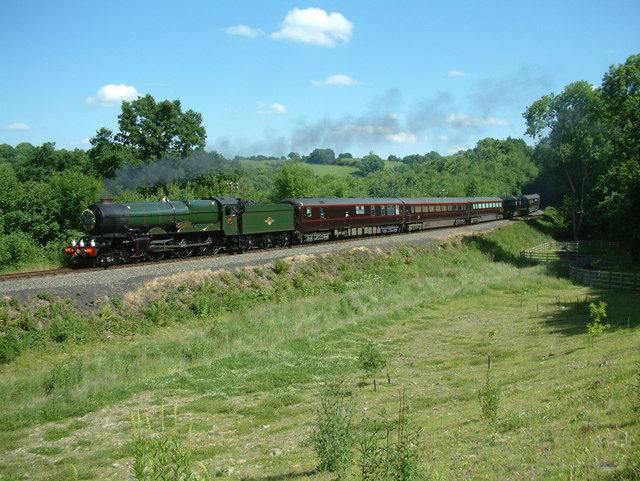
Hauling the Royal Train on the Severn Valley Railway

On 10 June 2008, 6024 hauled the Royal Train, with Charles, Prince of Wales and Camilla, Duchess of Cornwall on board, from Kidderminster Town to Bridgnorth on the Severn Valley Railway. Between Bewdley and Arley, the Prince of Wales drove the locomotive.

Before leaving the SVR to resume its mainline appointments a broken tender axlebox was discovered that delayed its departure. Once repaired, a further delay was incurred by a defect in the air pump.

== Royal Scot Locomotive & General Trust ==
Following an internal dispute within the 6024 Society which had owned the locomotive since its preservation, an unsuccessful legal case was pursued in 2010 by the owning Trusts board against the former Chief Mechanical Engineer, which resulted in a loss in the High Court. The resulting requirement to pay compensation and both parties' legal costs totalling over £500,000, resulted in the society becoming deficient in liquid cash funds.

Following discussions with various interested parties in December 2010, the society agreed to sell the locomotive to the Royal Scot Locomotive and General Trust, chaired by investor and steam enthusiast Jeremy Hosking. Following a meeting in December 2023, The 6024 Society closed voluntarily.

From April 2012 the locomotive is currently undergoing a 10 yearly heavy general overhaul at the West Somerset Railway's workshops at Minehead, Somerset. 6024 undertook a steam test in late 2022 and left the West Somerset Railway by road for Crewe in February 2023 for the completion of its overhaul.

In May 2026, 6024 went out on a test run from Crewe to Chester on 6 May with a second test run took place on 26 May. The overhaul included the installation of slimmer cylinders with a narrower front buffer beam to help the engine fit within the smaller loading gauge of smaller branch lines.
