= GWR 6000 Class 6023 King Edward II =

Preserved British steam locomotive

King Edward II
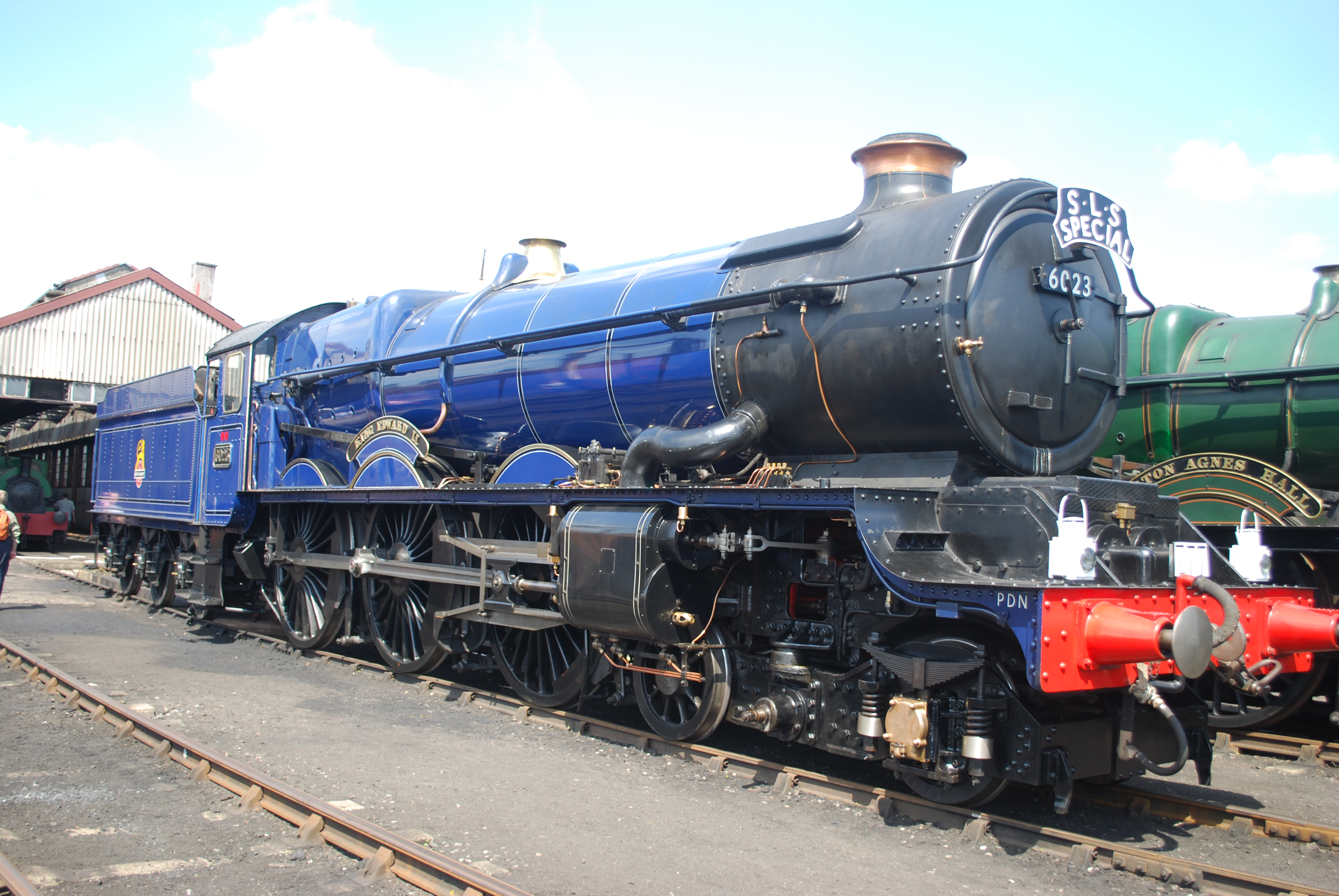
- 6023 King Edward II at Didcot Railway Centre in May 2013
Type and origin
- Power type: Steam
- Designer: Charles Collett
- Builder: Swindon Works
- Build date: June 1930
Specifications
- Configuration
  - Whyte: 4-6-0
  - UIC: 2′C h4
- Gauge: 4 ft 8 1/2 in (1,435 mm) standard gauge
- Leading dia.: 3 ft 0 in (0.914 m)
- Driver dia.: 6 ft 6 in (1.981 m)
- Minimum curve: 8 chains (530 ft; 160 m) normal, 7 chains (460 ft; 140 m) slow
- Length
  - Over beams: 68 ft 2 in (20.78 m)
- Width: 8 ft 11 1/2 in (2.73 m)
- Height: 13 ft 4 3/4 in (4.08 m)
- Axle load: 22 long tons 10 cwt (50,400 lb or 22.9 t) full
- Adhesive weight: 67 long tons 10 cwt (151,200 lb or 68.6 t) full
- Loco weight: 89 long tons 0 cwt (199,400 lb or 90.4 t) full
- Tender weight: 46 long tons 14 cwt (104,600 lb or 47.4 t) full
- Total weight: 135 long tons 14 cwt (304,000 lb or 137.9 t)
- Fuel type: Coal
- Fuel capacity: 6 long tons 0 cwt (13,400 lb or 6.1 t)
- Water cap.: 4,000 imp gal (18,000 L; 4,800 US gal)
- Boiler
  - Type: GWR Number 12
- Boiler pressure: 250 lbf/in^{2} (1.72 MPa)
- Heating surface
  - Firebox: 194 sq ft (18.0 m^{2})
  - Tubes: 2,008 sq ft (186.5 m^{2})
- Superheater
  - Heating area: 313 sq ft (29.1 m^{2})
- Cylinders: Four, two inside, two outside
- Cylinder size: 16.25 in × 28 in (413 mm × 711 mm)
- Valve gear: Inside cylinders: Walschaerts; Outside cylinders: derived from inside cylinders via rocking bars
Performance figures
- Tractive effort: 39,700 lbf (176.6 kN) currently
Career
- Operators: Great Western Railway; British Railways
- Class: GWR 6000 Class
- Axle load class: GWR: Double Red
- Locale: Western Region
- Delivered: June 1930
- Withdrawn: June 1962
- Current owner: Didcot Railway Centre
- Disposition: Preserved

Great Western Railway (GWR) 6000 Class 6023 King Edward II is a preserved steam locomotive.

== Operational career ==
The locomotive was built at the Great Western Railway's Swindon Works, out-shopped in June 1930. For most of its working life it was allocated to Newton Abbot and Laira depots, working express passenger trains to and from Devon to London Paddington. Withdrawn from Cardiff in June 1962, it was sent to Swindon Works for breaking up. However, in light of the installation of a new bridge west of Bristol towards South Wales, it was coupled to its twin, 6024 King Edward I, and towed to the bridge for weight testing purposes. With both locomotives now closer to South Wales than Swindon, the decision was made to sell them to Woodham Brothers scrapyard in Barry. This decision would later prove to be invaluable, as it would result in both locomotives surviving.

== Preservation ==
Whilst King Edward I was saved in 1974, King Edward II remained at the scrapyard due to the rear driving wheels being flame-cut following a derailment at Woodham Brothers. However, as part of the 150th anniversary of the Great Western Railway in 1985, the hulk was acquired by Harvey's of Bristol, and was moved to a bay platform at Bristol Temple Meads railway station called the Fish Dock.

== Restoration ==
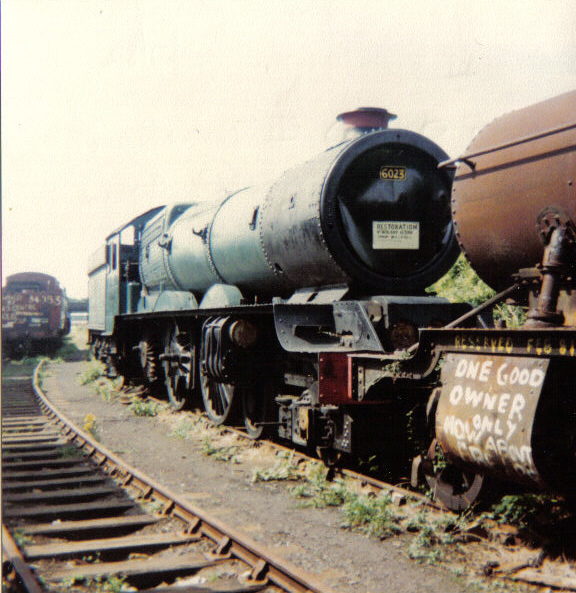
King Edward II at Woodham Brothers in 1982

The Brunel Engineering Centre Trust, under a Manpower Services Commission (MS) scheme, completely dismantled 6023 and restoration began. Work continued until the autumn of 1988, when the MS scheme funding was withdrawn and the future of 6023 was cast into doubt.

6023 was then bought by the Great Western Society (GWS) and moved to the Didcot Railway Centre in March 1990 for its restoration to continue. The restoration included the casting of new rear driving wheels in 1994, followed by re-wheeling the chassis in 1995. The casting is notable since it is thought to be the first wheels to be created for a standard gauge locomotive in preservation. The damaged wheels were also acquired by the GWS at Didcot and can today be seen on display there. Unlike the other preserved "King" class locomotives, the GWS decided to restore 6023 to its as-built single-chimney configuration. All "Kings" had been converted to double chimneys under British Railways ownership, which improved performance and efficiency but changed the original appearance.

On 12 April 2010, King Edward II's boiler passed its steam test, and on 20 January 2011 it moved for the first time under its own power since 1962. It was due to re-enter service on 2 April 2011.

Initially, King Edward II has been painted in the early BR express passenger blue livery, rather than the later standard BR Brunswick Green livery currently carried by 6000 King George V and 6024 King Edward I.

== Return to service ==
King Edward II hauling a train on the Mid-Norfolk Railway, in 2011

The locomotive re-entered passenger service on the Mid-Norfolk Railway on 4 June 2011, as part of a running-in programme leading to the engine's return to the main line. During the road journey to Dereham, the locomotive lost its safety valve cover, with the Mid-Norfolk offering a cash reward for its safe return. The cover was restored to the locomotive by Sunday 5 June.

On return to Didcot, it was found that the firebox and boiler stays had broken, resulting in the need for a large amount of remedial work to the boiler. On 6 September 2012, the locomotive was moved to Loughborough on the Great Central Railway for firebox repairs, which were completed during early 2013. The locomotive then made a series of appearances on the Great Central Railway, for both testing and running-in purposes but was later returned to Didcot where it was to be prepared to operate on the main line. In 2014, the GWS was given derogation by Network Rail to use a portable GSM-R radio unit on 6023. This unit could then also be used on other GWS locomotives yet to work on the mainline, such as 2999 Lady of Legend and 4079 Pendennis Castle.

Owing to height restriction rules the locomotive had to be reduced in height to comply with the Network Rail loading gauge (the maximum permitted height for steam engines being 13 ft 1 in and the original height of the kings being 4 inches over at 13 ft 5 in). This required the fitment of a cutdown cab and shorter safety valve cover alongside a shorter chimney. The shorter chimney however adversely affected the draughting. A new design of blastpipe with four nozzles was designed and fitted to the engine which after early indications had eliminated the draughting issues on the engine. The other preserved "King" class locomotives 6000 King George V and 6024 King Edward I are both fitted with double chimneys and therefore it was not possible simply to use the same proven blastpipe and chimney arrangement on 6023.

Owing to the amount of time the rectification work took alongside how short the amount of time was left on the engine's boiler ticket, it was decided to abandon the mainline certification until after the engine's next overhaul was completed. An announcement from Didcot later on regarding the ceasing of mainline operations owing to costs and wishing to get more use of their engines, 6023 would now not be undergoing certification to run on the mainline. The only mainline journey it undertook, was to be hauled in light steam by 70013 Oliver Cromwell to a display at Old Oak Common TMD via London Paddington in August 2017. With mainline equipment no longer needed the engine was re-fitted with its original cab and later on its original height safety valve cover and chimney which also included re-fitting its original blastpipe. It made its final journey at Didcot before its boiler certificate expired on 13 September 2020.

In April 2025, it was announced that while still non operational 6023 was to appear on static display at The Greatest Gathering which was taking place from Friday 1 August to Sunday 3 August 2025. The event was to take place at Derby Litchurch Lane Works and was being run as part of the rail 200 celebrations to celebrate 200 years of railways and the opening of the Stockton and Darlington Railway in 1825. During the event 6023 was placed on display inside one of the sheds alongside other locomotives including 46203 'Princess Margaret Rose' and numerous other locomotives and rolling stock.
