= Torbay Express =

British passenger train

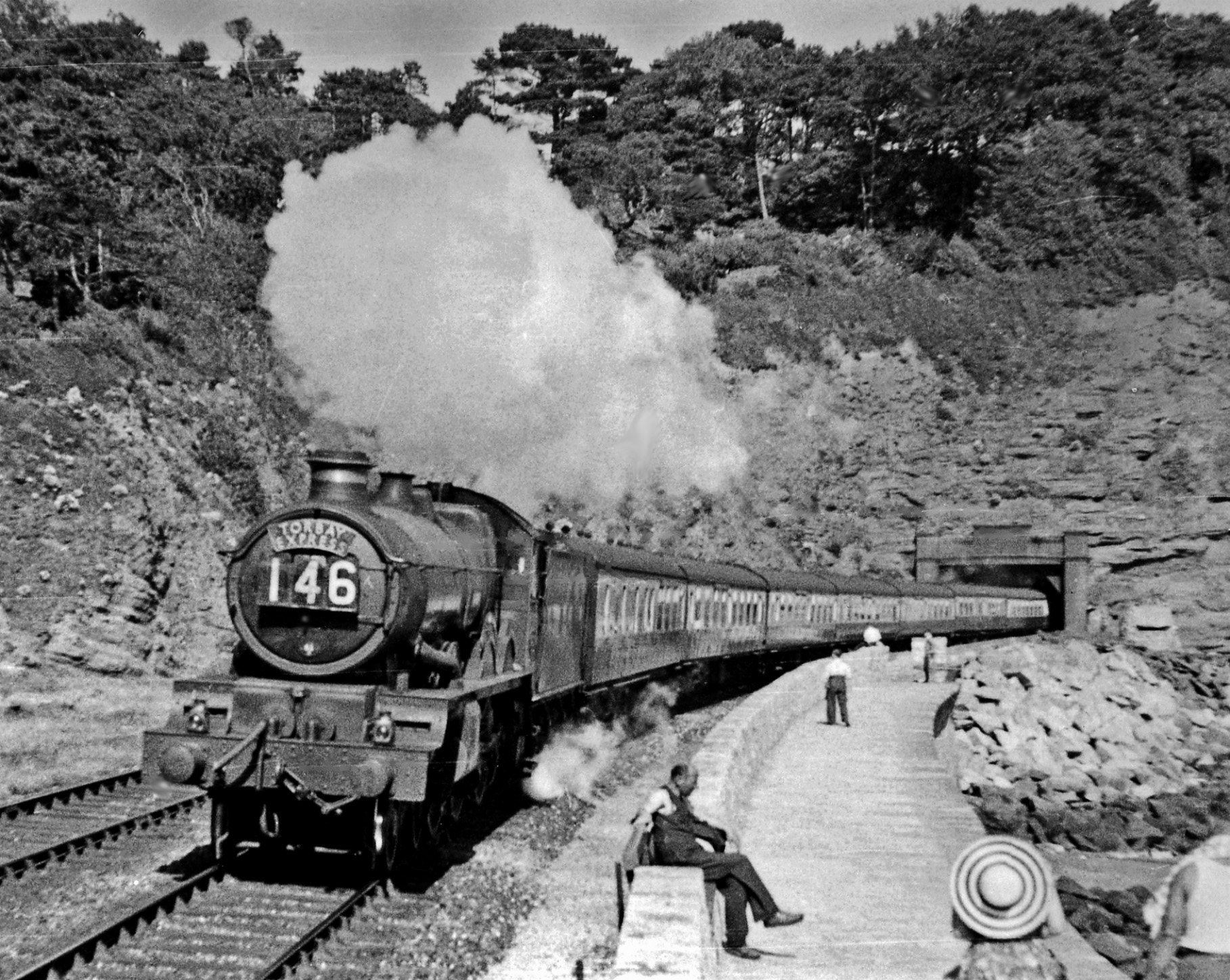
Ex-GWR 'Castle' 4-6-0 No. 5079 Lysander heads the down Torbay Express out of Parson's Tunnel at Dawlish

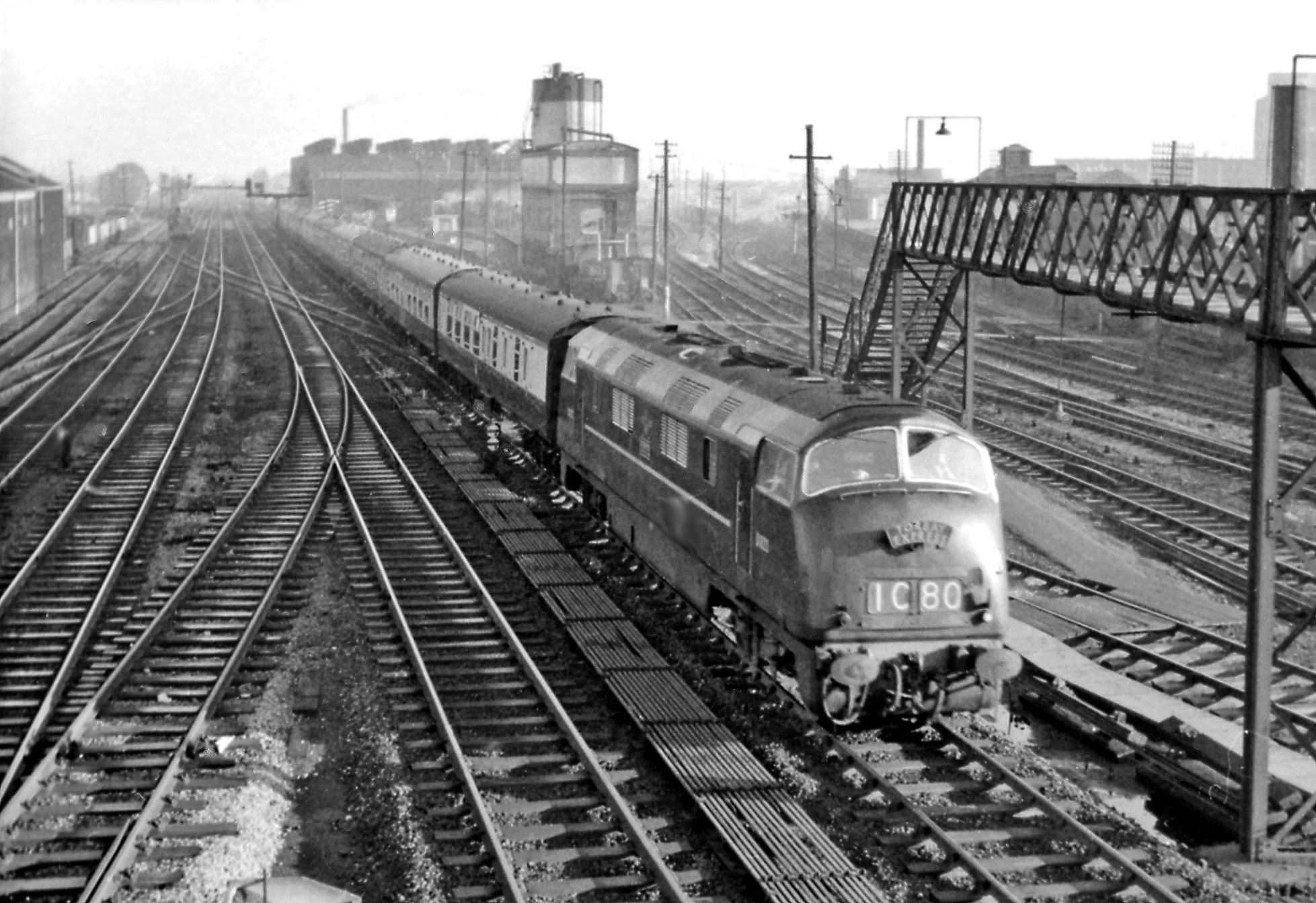
The Torbay Express in 1960

The Torbay Express is a named passenger train operating in the United Kingdom.

The Torbay Express departs from Bristol Temple Meads railway station on summer Sundays at approximately 09:15 with arrival back in Bristol at about 20:10 (depending on the route).

== Great Western Railway ==
The Torbay Express was a named train run by the Great Western Railway between Paddington and Kingswear, with a departure time from Paddington of 11:50. Originally the down train also included a slip portion for Ilfracombe, this being detached at Taunton. The departure time from London was changed to 12 noon before the First World War and continued at the same time until after World War II although the slip portion had ceased by 1918.

From 1961 the train, now the 12:30 from Paddington, split at Exeter St Davids with the other portion continuing to Plymouth, and in 1967 the name was dropped from the daily service and applied to a separate train running on Saturdays only and departing from Paddington at 10:50. In 1983 the name was again applied to a daily service when, in the summer timetable, the 9:20 Paddington to Paignton and 12:55 return had the name applied.

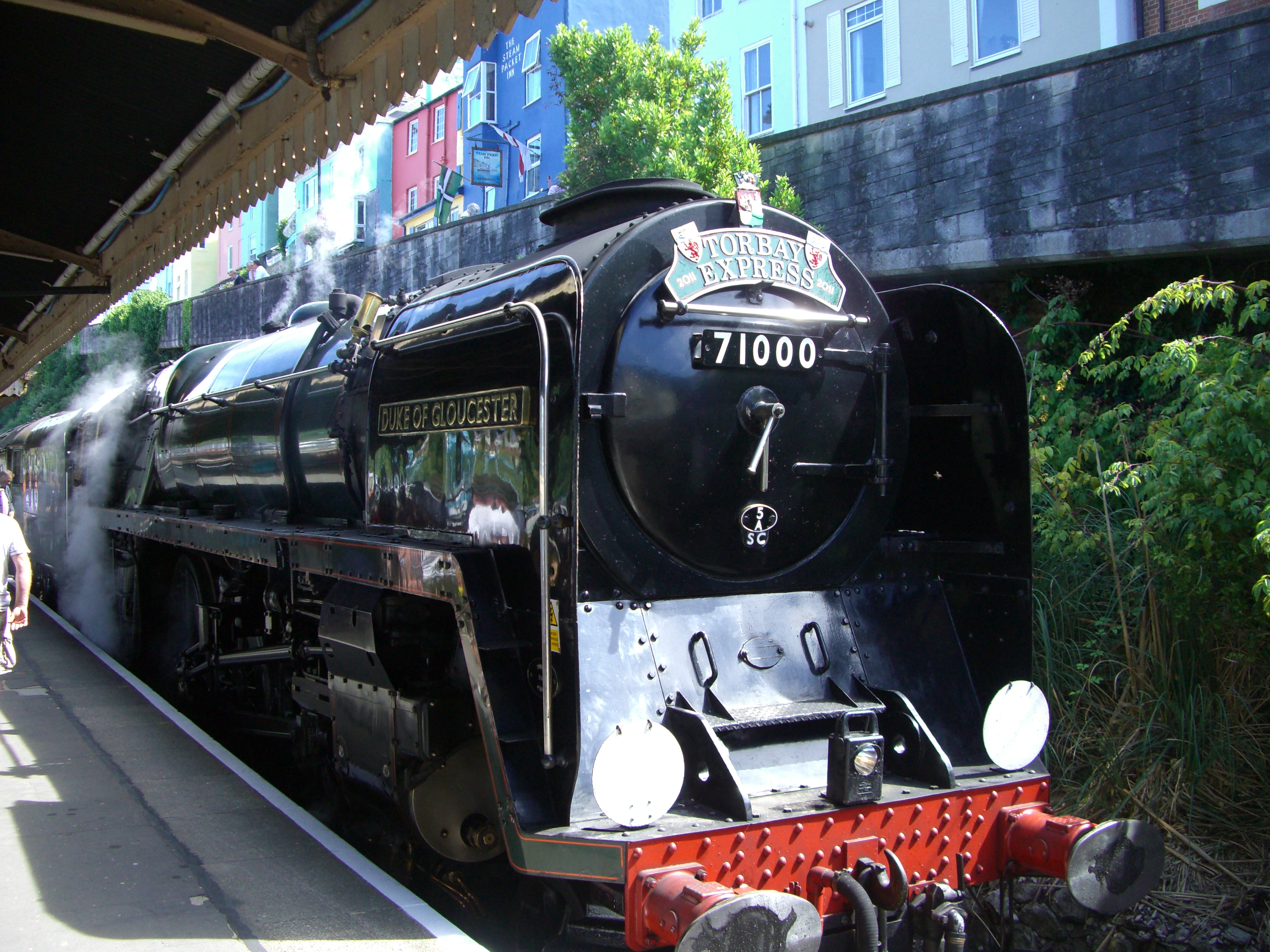
BR Standard Class 8 Locomotive 71000 Duke Of Gloucester arrives at Kingswear railway station in August 2011 as the Torbay Express.

=== Torbay Pullman ===
In addition to the Torbay Express, in the summer of 1929 the GWR introduced an all-Pullman train leaving Paddington at 11:00 and arriving at Paignton at 12:25. The eight coach formation was then prepared for the return departure at 16:30. The service was not a commercial success and ceased in 1930.

== Revival ==
=== Great Western Railway (TOC) ===
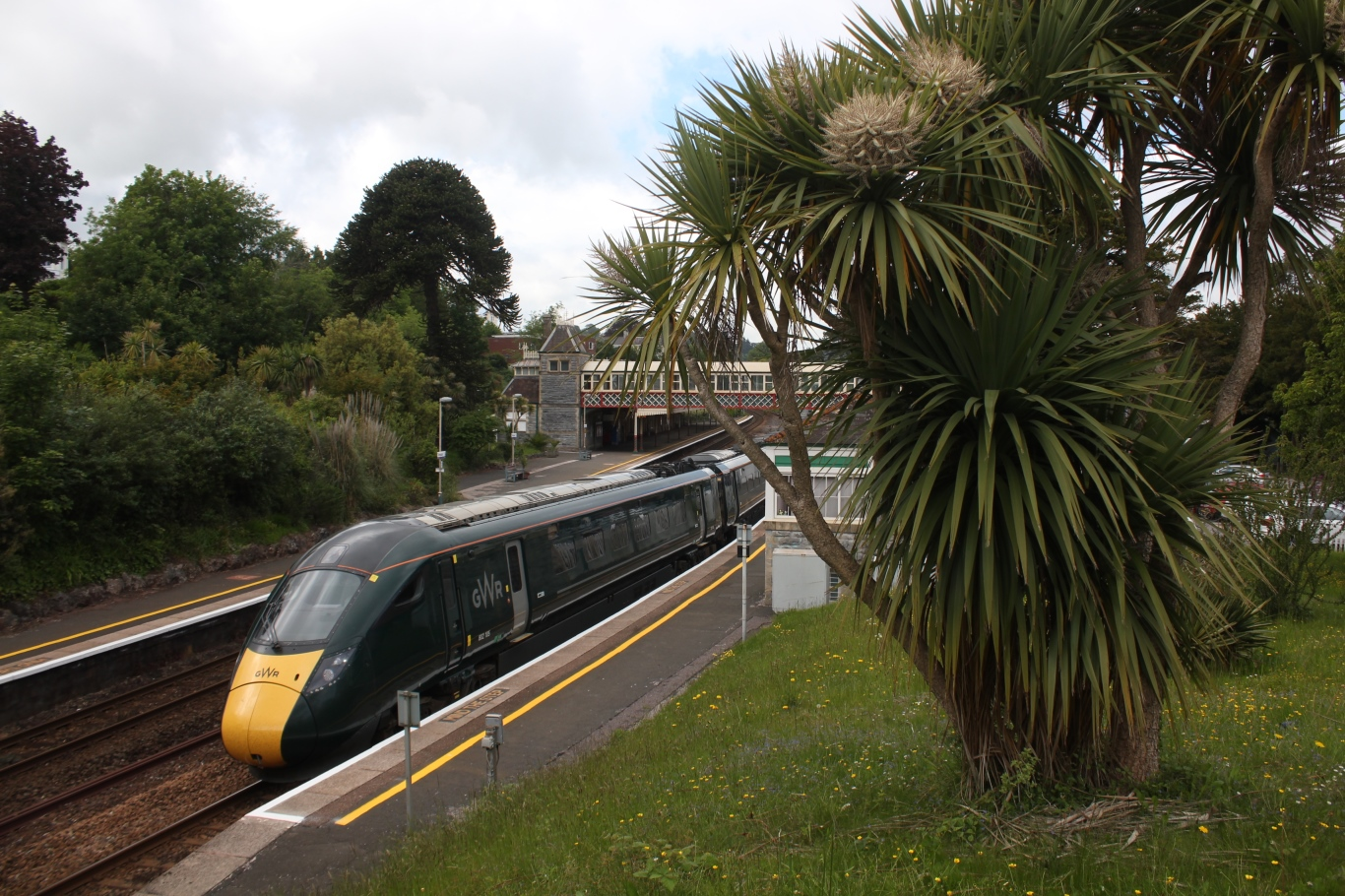
Great Western Railway Class 802 IET with a westbound Torbay Express at Torquay in June 2021

The Torbay Express name is also used by Great Western Railway (train operating company) for its 10:35 service from London Paddington to Paignton (via Castle Cary), and the 13:55 return (via Castle Cary and the Reading to Taunton Line).

=== Summer steam excursion ===
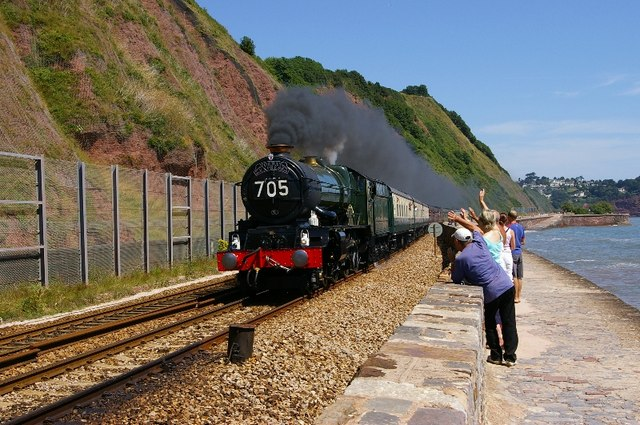
Ex-GWR 'King' 4-6-0 No.6024 King Edward I heads the revived Torbay Express charter at Sprey Point, Devon, July 2006

From 2003, Past-Time Rail revived the Torbay Express as a passenger charter steam locomotive service, to run on certain summer Sundays and some Saturdays, from: Bristol Temple Meads via stops at Weston-Super-Mare and Taunton; to Paignton and onwards via the Dartmouth Steam Railway to Kingswear. For the 2014 season, two of the booked railtours ran via Westbury instead of Weston-super-Mare, calling at Bath Spa, Trowbridge, Westbury and Taunton, then picking up the normal route. At first, this was done because of engineering works. However, thanks to its success, the same concept was repeated with two trains for the 2015 season.

After Past-Time Rail went bankrupt in June 2009, the service obligation has been taken over by Torbay Express Ltd. This company was formed as a subsidiary of booking agent Pathfinder Tours, itself a subsidiary of Riviera Trains. As well as taking direct bookings, the company also takes bookings through Pathfinder Tours, who advertise the service as part of their tour programme, and also supply their own volunteers to steward the trains.

Since being taken over by Pathfinder Tours/Riviera Trains, the British Railways Mark 1 coaching stock has been supplied in historic cream/brown by Riviera, and staffed by Pathfinder. The back-up diesel locomotive is supplied and operated by DB Schenker Rail (UK), sourced from a varying number of spot-hire companies, mainly West Coast Railways. During the operating season, the coaching stock is stabled in a spare covered road under the engine shed of Bristol Temple Meads, whilst the steam locomotive is stabled at a temporary operating base at Bristol Barton Hill MPD.

Initial steam power was supplied by GWR 7800 Class 7802 Bradley Manor and GWR 4073 Class 5051 Earl Bathurst, but has varied since by season, latterly supplied from the Jeremy Hosking-backed Locomotive Services Ltd. Motive power has included: GWR 6000 Class 6024 King Edward I; LNER Class A4 60009 Union of South Africa; LNER Class A1 60163 Tornado; SR Battle of Britain Class 34067 Tangmere; BR Class 8P 71000 Duke of Gloucester; BR Britannia Class 7MT 70000 Britannia; LNER Class A4 4464 Bittern; SR West Country Class 34046 Braunton; GWR 4073 Class 5029 Nunney Castle; LMS Royal Scot Class 46100 Royal Scot; SR Merchant Navy Class 35028 Clan Line.

Torbay Express Ltd was liquidated in 2022. A replacement service by Locomotive Services Limited runs on Saturdays as the "English Riviera Express".
