= Old Georgians =

Old Georgians, sometimes abbreviated to OG, refers to old boys/girls of schools with George in the name of the school, including:

- St George's College, Harare, Zimbabwe
- St George's School, Harpenden, Hertfordshire
- King George V College, Southport, Merseyside
- St. George's Institution, Malaysia
- St. George's College, Quilmes, Argentina
- St George's College, Weybridge, Surrey, England

It may also refer to:

- Old Georgian Club, a rugby and cricket club from Palermo, Buenos Aires
- Old Georgians Hockey Club, English field hockey premier league team

== See also ==
- King George School (disambiguation), various schools
- Old Georgian language
