= GVIR =

GVIR or variation, may refer to:

- A Royal cypher
  - King George VI of the United Kingdom, whose Royal Cipher was "George VI Rex"
- Itamar Ben-Gvir (born 1976), Israeli lawyer
- g Vir, a star in the constellation Virgo, see List of stars in Virgo

== See also ==
- George VI (disambiguation)
- virG, a plasmid gene and protein found in Agrobacterium tumefaciens
- Virus G, a virus strain or species, see List of virus species
- VIR (disambiguation)
