= Richard IV =

Richard IV may refer to:

- Perkin Warbeck, pretender to the English throne
- Richard of Shrewsbury, 1st Duke of York, impersonated by Warbeck, and whom the Blackadder character was very loosely based on
- Richard de la Pole, the Yorkist pretender, declared king of England by Louis of France in 1513.

== Fictional characters ==
- Richard IV of England (Blackadder), fictional character in TV series Blackadder based on Richard of Shrewsbury
- Richard IV, fictional character in TV programme The Palace
- Richard IV, first son of Victoria II, in Long Live The King by John Rowe
- Richard IV, father of Henry IX, in the 2003 novel Yellow Dog by Martin Amis
