= King George =

King George may refer to:

== People ==
=== Monarchs ===
==== Bohemia ====
- George of Bohemia (1420-1471, r. 1458-1471), king of Bohemia

==== Duala people of Cameroon ====
- George (Duala king) (late 18th century), king of the Duala people

==== Georgia ====
- George I of Georgia (998 or 1002 - 1027, r. 1014-1027)
- George I of Imereti (d. 1392, r. 1389-1392)
- George II of Georgia (d. 1112, r. 1072-1089)
- George II of Imereti (d. 1585, r. 1565-1585)
- George II of Kakheti (d. 1513, r. 1511-1513)
- George III of Georgia (d. 1184, r. 1156-1184)
- George III of Imereti (d. 1639, r. 1605-1639)
- George IV of Georgia (1192-1223, r. 1213-1223)
- George V of Georgia (1286/1289-1346, r. 1299-1302 and 1318-1346)
- George VI of Georgia (d. 1318, r. 1311-1318)
- George VII of Georgia (d. 1407, r. 1393-1407)
- George VI of Imereti (d. 1720, r. 1703-1711, 1712-1713, 1713-1716, 1719-1720)
- George VIII of Georgia (1415/1417-1476, r. Georgia 1446-1466, r. Kakheti 1466-1476)
- George VII of Imereti (1718-1778, r. 1741)
- George IX of Kartli (d. 1539, r. 1525-1527 )
- George X of Kartli (1560-1606, r. 1600-1606)
- George XI of Kartli (d. 1709, r. 1676-1688 and 1703-1709)
- George XII of Georgia (1746-1800, r. 1798-1800)

==== Greece ====
- George I of Greece (1845–1913), King of the Hellenes 1863–1913
- George II of Greece (1890–1947), King of the Hellenes 1922–1924, 1935–1947

==== Hanover ====
- George III of the United Kingdom (1738–1820), also George III of Hanover, 1814–1820
- George IV of the United Kingdom (1762–1830), also George IV of Hanover, 1820–1830
- George V of Hanover (1819–78), last king of Hanover 1851–1866

==== Makuria ====
- Georgios I of Makuria (c. AD 860-920)
- Georgios II of Makuria (r. 887-915/920)

==== Saxony ====
- George, King of Saxony (1832-1904, r. 1902-1904)

==== Tonga ====
- George Tupou I (1797-1893, r. 1845-1893), king of Tonga
- George Tupou II (1874-1918, r. 1893-1918), king of Tonga
- George Tupou V (1948-2012, r. 2006-2012), king of Tonga

==== United Kingdom ====
- George I of Great Britain (1660–1727), King of Great Britain and Ireland 1714–1727
- George II of Great Britain (1683–1760), King of Great Britain and Ireland 1727–1760
- George III (1738–1820), King of the United Kingdom 1760–1820
- George IV (1762–1830), King of the United Kingdom 1820–1830
- George V (1865–1936), King of the United Kingdom of Great Britain and Ireland 1910–1927, King of the United Kingdom of Great Britain and Northern Ireland 1927–1936
- George VI (1895–1952), King of the United Kingdom of Great Britain and Northern Ireland 1936–1952, father of Elizabeth II

=== People with the name ===
- "King George", a nickname for basketball player Paul George (b. 1990)
- "KingGeorge", a nickname of George Kassa, former Tom Clancy's Rainbow Six Siege professional player turned streamer
- George Strait (b. 1952), American country singer (popularly known as the "King of Country")
- "King George", stage name for an R&B and blues singer based out of Hopkins, South Carolina.

=== Fictional characters ===
- King George II, a fictional character from Pirates of the Caribbean: On Stranger Tides
- King George (Once Upon a Time), a fictional character from the U.S. TV series Once Upon a Time
- King George, a fictional character in Queen of the South
- King George, a character from the 2026 animated film Hoppers

== Arts, entertainment, and media ==
- "King George and the Ducky", an episode of the Christian children's show VeggieTales

== Places ==
- King George County, Virginia
  - King George, Virginia, a community in the county
- King George, Saskatoon, a neighbourhood in Saskatoon, Saskatchewan, Canada
- Rural Municipality of King George No. 256, a rural municipality in Saskatchewan
- King George Boulevard, in Surrey, British Columbia
- King George Station of the Vancouver SkyTrain
- King George Island (disambiguation)
- King George, Honiara, a suburb in Honiara, Solomon Islands
- King George's and Sunray (ward), ward in London, England
- King George Central, building in Brisbane, Australia

== Sports ==
Two British horse races, both commonly known simply as "the King George":

- King George VI Chase at Kempton Park (National Hunt)
- King George VI and Queen Elizabeth Stakes at Ascot (Flat)

== Transportation ==
- King George (1750 HBC vessel), operated by the Hudson's Bay Company (HBC) from 1750–1755, see Hudson's Bay Company vessels
- King George (1761 HBC vessel), operated by the HBC from 1761–1780, see Hudson's Bay Company vessels
- King George (1781 HBC vessel), operated by the HBC from 1781–1812, see Hudson's Bay Company vessels
- King George V-class battleship

== See also ==
- King (disambiguation)
- George (disambiguation)
- George I (disambiguation)
- George II (disambiguation)
- George III (disambiguation)
- George IV (disambiguation)
- George V (disambiguation)
- George VI (disambiguation)
- George VII (disambiguation)
- George IX (disambiguation)
- George Bridge (disambiguation)
- George Street (disambiguation)
