= KGV =

KGV can refer to:

- George V, King of Britain
- One of two King George V-class battleship classes (KGV class)
  - King George V-class battleship (1911), a class of four Royal Navy battleships that served in World War I
  - King George V-class battleship (1939), a class of five Royal Navy battleships that served in World War II
- TS King George V, the turbine ship KGV
- King George V College
- King George V School (disambiguation)
- King George V School (Hong Kong)
- King George V Park in Newfoundland
- KGV Oval in Tasmania
- the ISO 639-3 code for Karas language
- the railway station code for Kingsgrove railway station
- King George V DLR station, London
- the aviation waypoint, 23° 40' 47S 22° 49' 12E

== See also ==
- George V (disambiguation)
