= GVR =

GVR may refer to:

== Company ==
- Gilbarco Veeder-Root (GVR)

== People ==
- A Royal cypher
  - George V of the United Kingdom (GVR), whose Royal cipher was "George V Rex"
- Guido van Rossum (GvR), computer programmer known for creating the Python programming language
  - Guido van Robot (GvR), a learning tool for the Python programming language
- G. Vijayaraghavan, Indian cardiologist

== Transportation ==
- Glenbrook Vintage Railway, in New Zealand
- Grand Valley Railway, in the western United States
- Gwendreath Valleys Railway, in Wales; a component of the Burry Port and Gwendraeth Valley Railway
- Goresuar train station (rail code: GVR), see List of railway stations in India
- Governador Valadares Airport (IATA airport code: GVR; ICAO airport code: SBGV;), in Brazil

== Other uses ==
- Green Valley Ranch, resort near Las Vegas
- Gurung language (ISO 639 language code: gvr)
- Grant, vacate, remand, an order issued by the U.S. Supreme Court to grant a writ of certiorari for the sole purpose of vacating a judgment and remanding it to the court below for further consideration.

== See also ==
- George V (disambiguation)
