= George VI (disambiguation) =

George VI (1895–1952) was King of the United Kingdom and the British Dominions from 1936 to 1952 and Emperor of India from 1936 to 1948.

George VI may also refer to:

- George VI of Georgia (died 1313), king of Georgia from 1311
- George VI of Imereti (died 1720), king of Imereti
- George VI of Armenia (1868–1954), Catholicos of the Armenian Apostolic Church from 1945 to 1954
- King George VI Bridge, over the river Dee in Aberdeen, Scotland
- King George VI, one of the four Dreadnought-class submarines ordered for the Royal Navy
- King George VI, a GWR 6000 Class locomotive
- King George VI, a LMS Coronation Class locomotive

== See also ==
- George IV (disambiguation) or George 4
- King George (disambiguation)
