= George II =

George II is the name of:

- George II of Antioch (seventh century AD)
- George II of Armenia (late ninth century)
- George II of Abkhazia (916–960)
- Patriarch George II of Alexandria (1021–1051)
- George II of Georgia (1072–1089)
- George II of Constantinople (late twelfth century)
- Yuri II of Vladimir or George II (1189–1238)
- George II of Duklja, Prince of Duklja from 1208 to c. 1243
- George II of Bulgaria (before 1307–1322)
- George II Ghisi (d. 1352)
- George II, Prince of Anhalt-Dessau (1454–1509)
- George II of Kakheti (1464–1513)
- George II, Duke of Münsterberg-Oels (1512–1553)
- George II of Brieg (1523–1586)
- George II of Imereti (1565–1585)
- George II, Duke of Pomerania (1582–1617)
- George II, Landgrave of Hesse-Darmstadt (1605–1661)
- George II Rákóczi (1621–1660), prince of Transylvania
- George II Beseb'ely, Maronite Patriarch of Antioch in 1657–1670
- George II, Duke of Württemberg-Montbéliard (1626–1699)
- Patriarch Ignatius George II, head of the Syriac Orthodox Church in 1687–1708
- George II of Great Britain (1683–1760)
- George II Frederic (r. 1776–1801), king of the Miskito
- George II, Prince of Waldeck and Pyrmont (1789–1845)
- George II, Duke of Saxe-Meiningen (1826–1914)
- George II of Greece (1890–1947)
- George Frederick II, Margrave of Brandenburg-Ansbach (1678–1703)

== See also ==
- George Tupou II of Tonga (1874–1918)
- Đurađ II, of Zeta (died 1403)
- Georg II (disambiguation)
- King George (disambiguation)
