= George III (disambiguation) =

George III (1738–1820) was King of Great Britain and Ireland from 1760 to 1820.

George III or 3 may also refer to:

== People ==
- George III of Georgia (died 1184)
- George III, Landgrave of Leuchtenberg (1502–1555)
- George III, Prince of Anhalt-Dessau (1507–1553)
- George III Dadiani, Prince of Mingrelia (died 1582)
- George III, Count of Erbach-Breuberg (1548–1605)
- George III of Imereti (1605–1639)
- George III of Brieg (1611–1664)
- George III, Landgrave of Hesse-Itter (1632–1676)
- George III Gurieli, Prince of Guria (died 1684)
- George III of Cyprus (Archbishop of Cyprus) (born 1949)

== Other uses ==
- George III (ship), a British convict ship wrecked in 1835
- GEORGE 3, a computer operating system from ICL

== See also ==
- King George (disambiguation)
