= George IX =

George IX may refer to:

- George IX of Kartli (died 1539), king of the Georgian kingdom of Kartli
- George VII of Imereti (1712–post-1772), king of the Georgian kingdom of Imereti

== See also ==
- King George (disambiguation)
