= George IV (disambiguation) =

George IV (1762–1830) was King of the United Kingdom of Great Britain and Ireland and of Hanover from 1820 to 1830.

George IV or 4 may refer to:

== People ==
- George IV of Georgia (1192–1223)
- George IV of Ortenburg (died 1627)
- George IV, Count of Erbach-Fürstenau (died 1678)
- George IV of Imereti (r. 1696–1698)
- George IV Dadiani (died 1715)
- George IV Gurieli (died 1726)
- Ignatius George IV (died 1781), Syriac Orthodox Church patriarch of Antioch
- Kevork IV (died 1882), Armenian catholicos
- Jorge IV, Archbishop of Braga, see Roman Catholic Archdiocese of Braga
- Georg IV, Abbot of Kaisheim, see Kaisheim Abbey

== Other uses ==
- George IV, Brixton, a former public house on Brixton Hill in south London
- GEORGE 4, version of GEORGE computer operating system
- George IV Bridge, Edinburgh, Scotland, UK; an elevated street
- George IV State Diadem, part of the British Crown Jewels

== See also ==
- George VI (disambiguation) or George 6
- King George (disambiguation)
