= Vladimir of Duklja =

Vladimir of Duklja may refer to:

- Jovan Vladimir of Duklja, Prince of Duklja, and Christian Saint (d. 1016)
- Vladimir II of Duklja, Prince of Duklja, from 1103 to 1113

== See also ==
- Vladimir (disambiguation)
- George of Duklja (disambiguation)
- Michael of Duklja (disambiguation)
- Duklja
