= Michael of Duklja =

Michael of Duklja may refer to:

- Michael I of Duklja, Prince and King of Duklja and Serbia (d. 1081)
- Michael II of Duklja, King of Duklja, c. 1101–1102
- Michael III of Duklja, Prince of Duklja, from c. 1170 to 1186

== See also ==
- Michael (disambiguation)
- George of Duklja (disambiguation)
- Vladimir of Duklja (disambiguation)
- Duklja
