= King George, Honiara =

King George
- Suburb
- Location in Guadalcanal
- Coordinates: 9°26′S 159°57′E
- Country: Solomon Islands
- Province: Honiara Town
- Island: Guadalcanal
- Elevation: 29 m (95 ft)
- Time zone: UTC+11 (UTC)

King George is a suburb in Honiara, Solomon Islands located east of the main center and west of Henderson.
