= King George School (Sutton, Vermont) =

Defunct therapeutic boarding school in Sutton, Vermont, United States

Location
- Sutton, Caledonia County, VT; United States; 44°39′32″N 72°4′22″W

Information
- Type: Private therapeutic boarding school
- Motto: If Knowledge is the amassing of information then Wisdom is the internalization of life's lessons learned through experience.
- Established: September 15, 1998
- Founder: Linda Houghton
- Status: Closed
- Closed: June 4, 2011
- Head of School: Gerard Jones
- Grades: 9–12
- Student to teacher ratio: 6:1
- Campus size: 300 acres (120 ha)

The King George School (KGS) was a private year-round coeducational therapeutic boarding high school in a rural location in Sutton, Vermont. Designed for students with alternative learning styles, attention difficulties, or behavioral and emotional problems, the school largely focused on using art as a form a therapy to help students process emotions as well as teaching students to use art as a coping mechanism.

Initially a member of Brown Schools, the King George School was later operated by UHS of Sutton, a subsidiary of Universal Health Services. It enrolled students in grades 9 through 12; enrollment was approximately 35 students with a maximum of 60–75 students. The school closed at the end of the 2010–2011 academic year due to insufficient funding.

== History ==
Founded by educator Linda Houghton, the school opened September 5, 1998. It was threatened with closure in 2005 when its original parent company, Brown Schools, declared bankruptcy, but school officials and parents raised funds to keep the school open. Subsequently, it became part of Universal Health Services.

In May 2011, school head Gerard Jones announced that due to lack of sufficient funding, the school would close on June 4, 2011, after graduating its last class. The King George School had enrolled a total of more than 250 students during its history.

The property was up for sale in 2021.
