= GWR 6000 Class =

Class of 4-6-0 steam locomotive

6000 King Class
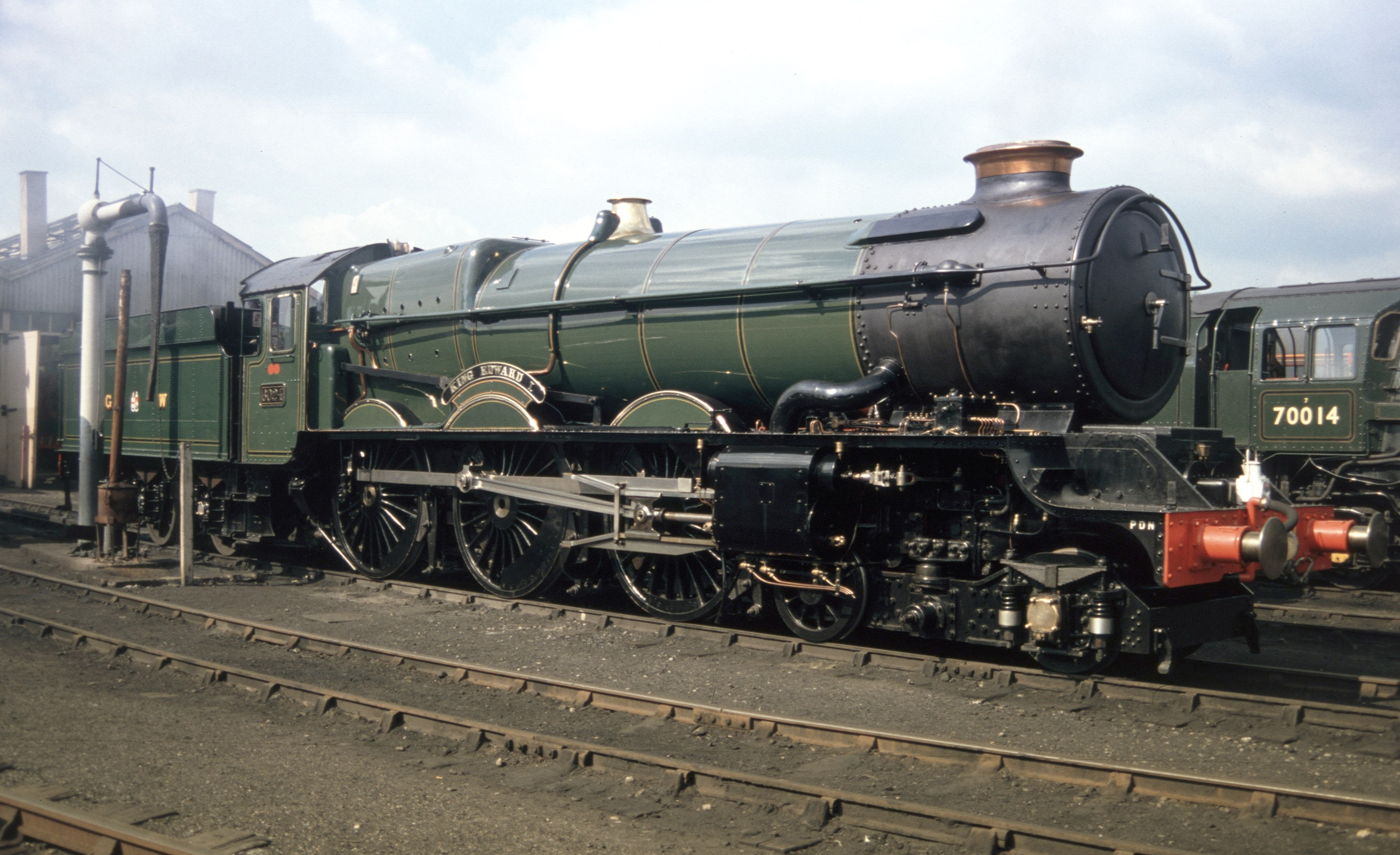
- 6024 King Edward I at Didcot Railway Centre in June 1994
Type and origin
- Power type: Steam
- Designer: Charles Collett
- Builder: GWR Swindon Works
- Order number: Lots 243, 267, 309
- Build date: 1927–1928 (20), 1930 (10), 1936 (1)
- Total produced: 31
Specifications
- Configuration
  - Whyte: 4-6-0
  - UIC: 2′C h4
- Gauge: 4 ft 8 1/2 in (1,435 mm) standard gauge
- Leading dia.: 3 ft 0 in (0.914 m)
- Driver dia.: 6 ft 6 in (1.981 m)
- Minimum curve: 8 chains (530 ft; 160 m) normal, 7 chains (460 ft; 140 m) slow
- Length: 68 ft 2 in (20.78 m) over buffers
- Width: 8 ft 11 1/2 in (2.731 m)
- Height: 13 ft 4 3/4 in (4.083 m)
- Axle load: 22 long tons 10 cwt (50,400 lb or 22.9 t) (25.2 short tons) full
- Adhesive weight: 67 long tons 10 cwt (151,200 lb or 68.6 t) (75.6 short tons) full
- Loco weight: 89 long tons 0 cwt (199,400 lb or 90.4 t) (99.7 short tons) full
- Tender weight: 46 long tons 14 cwt (104,600 lb or 47.4 t) (51.2 short tons) full
- Total weight: 135 long tons 14 cwt (304,000 lb or 137.9 t) (152.0 short tons)
- Fuel type: Coal
- Fuel capacity: 6 long tons 0 cwt (13,400 lb or 6.1 t) (6.7 short tons)
- Water cap.: 4,000 imp gal (18,000 L; 4,800 US gal)
- Boiler: GWR Standard No. 12
- Boiler pressure: 250 lbf/in^{2} (1.72 MPa)
- Cylinders: Four: two inside, two outside
- Cylinder size: 16 1/4 in × 28 in (413 mm × 711 mm)
- Valve gear: Inside cylinders: Walschaerts; Outside cylinders: derived from inside cylinders via rocking bars
Performance figures
- Tractive effort: 40,300 lbf (179.3 kN) original, 39,700 lbf (176.6 kN) after 1st overhaul
Career
- Operators: Great Western Railway; British Railways
- Class: 6000 King-class
- Power class: GWR: Special; BR: 8P
- Number in class: 30
- Numbers: 6000–6029
- Official name: King-class
- Axle load class: GWR: Double Red
- Locale: Western Region
- Withdrawn: 1936 (1), 1962 (30)
- Preserved: 6000, 6023, 6024
- Disposition: Three preserved, remainder scrapped.

The Great Western Railway (GWR) 6000 Class or King Class is a class of 4-6-0 steam locomotives designed for express passenger work and introduced in 1927. They were the largest locomotives built by the GWR, apart from the unique Pacific (The Great Bear). The class was named after kings of the United Kingdom and of England, beginning with the then reigning monarch, George V, and going back through history. (Note: As none of these locomotives served Scotland, it was not necessary to name them after kings of Scotland.) They handled the principal GWR expresses on the main line from London to the West of England and on the Chiltern line to Birmingham and Wolverhampton, until 1962 when the class was withdrawn.

== Background and development ==
By 1918, it was apparent to the GWR chief mechanical engineer George Jackson Churchward that his Star Class 4-6-0 locomotives would soon be incapable of handling the heaviest West of England expresses without assistance. He therefore proposed fitting the 6 ft (1.83 m) diameter boiler used on his 4700 Class 2-8-0 on to a 4-6-0 chassis, in 1919, to create a more powerful express locomotive, but was prevented from doing so by the weight restrictions on the GWR main line. The future problem was therefore left for his successor Charles Collett to solve.

On taking up office in 1922, Collett began to develop the more powerful Castle Class from Churchward's Star Class. However, the design was limited to a maximum axle-loading of 19.5 long tons (19,800 kg) due to the weakness of some underline bridges. The new class would not therefore be able to pull express trains with more than thirteen coaches unaided. Following their introduction in 1923, the Castle Class was the most powerful express passenger class in the country in terms of tractive effort, but this title was lost to the Southern Railway's Lord Nelson class in 1926.

The GWR's General Manager, Sir Felix Pole, was anxious for a new design that would once again enable the company to claim to run the most powerful locomotive. Pole agreed to allow Collett to explore a design for a "Super-Castle", subject to getting the tractive effort above 40,000 lbf (180,000 N). By 1927, a series of bridge renewals had taken place on the Great Western mainlines. This was coupled with the widely known (but as yet unpublished) findings of the Bridge Stress Committee, which gave engineers a better scientific understanding of the impact of hammer blow, and enabled the GWR Civil Engineer to agree to raise the maximum allowable axle-loading to 22.5 long tons (22,900 kg) for the new 'Super Castle' class.

== Design ==
Although Collett was nominally responsible for the design of the class, the detailed work was undertaken by his Chief draughtsman Frederick Hawksworth. The bulk of the increase in power over the Castle Class was initially achieved through raising the boiler pressure to a maximum of 250 pounds per square inch (1.72 MPa) and by increasing the cylinder stroke from 26 in (660 mm) to 28 in (711 mm). These factors together increased the tractive effort to around 38,165 lbf (169,770 N), slightly below the figure required by Pole.

As a means of increasing the tractive effort to bring it closer to the 40,000 lbf (180,000 N) requested by Pole, smaller 6 ft 6 in (1.981 m) driving wheels were used compared to the standard 6 ft 8.5 in (2.045 m) on the "Castles" and the first six locomotives to be built had their cylinders bored out to 16.25-inch (412.8 mm) giving a further 990 lbf (4,400 N), thereby enabling the 'Kings' to achieve a tractive effort of 40,300 lbf (179.3 kN). The smaller wheels also allowed for a wider boiler within the loading gauge to be used.

Later operational experience showed that loading gauge clearance of the outer cylinders was problematic, resulting in their replacement on each locomotive's first major overhaul, which resulted in a reduced tractive effort of 39,700 lbf (176.6 kN).

The new, 16 feet 0 inches (4.88 m) long, GWR 'Standard No.12' boiler was used on only this class. It had a maximum diameter of 6 feet 0 inches (1.829 m) tapering to 5 feet 6 1/4 inches (1.683 m). There were 171 x 2 1/4-inch (57 mm) fire tubes, and 16 x 5 1/8-inch (130 mm) flue tubes. The firebox area was 194 square feet (18.0 m^{2}), with a tube area of 2,008 square feet (186.5 m^{2}). As built, they had 96 × 1-inch (25 mm) superheater tubes.

To accommodate larger inner cylinders the distinctive design of the leading bogie was adopted, with outside bearings on the fore wheel and inside bearings on the rear wheel.

== Production ==
Twenty locomotives were ordered from the GWR Swindon Works in 1927 (Lot 243). The first locomotive No. 6000 King George V, appeared in June 1927. It was followed by five others (6001–6005) a month later. The remaining fourteen (6006–6019) appeared at almost weekly intervals between February and July 1928. A second batch of ten locomotives (6020-6029 Lot 267) appeared between May and August 1930.

No. 6007 King William III was written off after an accident near Shrivenham on 15 January 1936, and was condemned on 5 March 1936. A replacement was built (Lot 309) which may have incorporated some parts from the damaged locomotive; it took the same number and name, and was added to stock on 24 March 1936.

== Naming ==
According to O. S. Nock it was rumoured that the locomotives of the class, originally referred to as "Super Castles", were to be named after notable cathedrals, but in the event, with the first locomotive due to feature in the Baltimore and Ohio Railroad's (B&O) centenary celebrations, the GWR elected to name the class after British Kings. The cathedral rumour probably originated in a humorous article in the local newspaper while the class was being designed.

The class premier, No. 6000, was named King George V after the reigning monarch at the time, and the rest of the class would receive the names of English Kings in reverse order of ascendence to the throne. (i.e. No. 6001 King Edward VII, No. 6002 King William IV...)

Following the death of King George V in 1936, No. 6029 King Stephen was renamed King Edward VIII after his successor; and following the abdication of the latter in the same year, No. 6028 King Henry II was renamed King George VI after the new King.

== Operations ==
The class proved to be successful and able to cope with the heaviest express trains at a higher-speed timetable average than the "Castle". Due to their size and weight, the King class was however restricted to the London-Taunton-Plymouth (via both Bristol and Westbury) and the London-Birmingham-Wolverhampton (via Bicester) main lines. The class was therefore used on the GWR's crack expresses such as the Cornish Riviera Limited until the end of regular steam hauled express services on the Western Region of British Railways, although they needed assistance for the heaviest services over the South Devon Banks between Newton Abbot and Plymouth. They were unable to serve in Cornwall, due to the weakness of the Royal Albert Bridge, and so when they were hauling the Cornish Riviera Limited, they had to be swapped for a 'Castle' or 'Hall' at Devonport.

== King George V in the United States ==
After six months of operation, No. 6000 was shipped to North America in August 1927 to join in Baltimore & Ohio Centenary celebrations, where its sleek appearance and smooth performance impressed all who witnessed it. King George V was presented with a brass bell and cabside medallions to mark the occasion. The application of pressurised oil lubrication showed its advantages over the largely grease-lubricated American Locomotives, and was even incorporated into a later design for the B&O in 1928.

== Further developments ==
No. 6014 King Henry VII was partially streamlined in March 1935 with a hemispherical smokebox door, continuous splashers, straight nameplate, smooth running plate and a swept-back cab front, which was carried out so that the GWR would have a streamlined locomotive to promote against the upcoming Gresley A4 Pacifics. This was designed more for aesthetics rather than speed however, and would only give the most basic improvements in aerodynamics. The appendages were soon removed sometime prior to January 1943, with the exception of the cab which would be retained on the locomotive until 1953.

The class proved to be capable and reliable when using the high-calorific South Wales steam coal, on which the GWR had always relied for its good locomotive performance. However, during the 1948 locomotive exchanges, King Henry VI performed disappointingly using Yorkshire coal, despite demonstrating the 4-6-0 type's unique sure-footedness when climbing out of Kings Cross, where pacific types were apt to slip alarmingly.

As originally built the class had a Swindon superheater with an area of 313 square feet (29.1 m^{2}). However, in 1947 experiments were undertaken with a four-row high-degree superheater in No. 6022 King Edward III. As a result, the four-row superheaters were fitted to the whole class, and modifications were also made to the draughting arrangement, using No. 6001 King Edward VII as a test-bed. From September 1955, double blast-pipes and chimneys were fitted, initially to No. 6015 King Richard III. Following successful testing the whole of the class was subsequently modified and, as a result, their final years in British Railways ownership saw the very best of their performance, particularly on the steep South Devon Banks at Dainton, Rattery, and Hemerdon.

== Accidents and incidents ==
- On 10 August 1927, the leading bogie of, then new, 6003 King George IV, became derailed at speed approaching Midgham. This led to the suspension arrangement of the unusual bogie being improved.

There have been two serious accidents involving the class:

- On 15 January 1936, a freight train, hauled by GWR 2800 Class 2-8-0 No. 2802, became divided at Shrivenham, Berkshire. Due to errors by the guard of the freight train and a signalman, an express passenger train hauled by No. 6007 King William III ran into the six wagons that had been left behind and derailed. Two people were killed. As a result, the locomotive was written off and replaced by another with the same name and number.
- On 4 November 1940, an express passenger train hauled by No. 6028 King George VI was derailed at Norton Fitzwarren, Somerset due to the driver misreading signals. Twenty-seven people were killed and 57 were seriously injured.

== List of King Class locomotives ==
Thirty-one locomotives were built at Swindon, although only 30 were in service simultaneously:

No.	Name	Date built	Date Double Chimney	Date withdrawn	First shed	Last shed
6000	King George V	June 1927	December 1956	December 1962	Old Oak Common	Old Oak Common
6000	King George V	Alfloc water treatment fitted 1954. 1,910,424 miles (3,074,529 km) recorded on withdrawal. Restored by Bulmer's Railway Centre, Hereford. Preserved, National Railway Museum, York. Currently at Steam Railway Museum, Swindon.				
6001	King Edward VII	July 1927	February 1956	September 1962	Old Oak Common	Wolverhampton, Stafford Road
6001	King Edward VII	Scrapped at Cox & Danks, Oldbury				
6002	King William IV	July 1927	March 1956	September 1962	Plymouth Laira	Wolverhampton, Stafford Road
6002	King William IV	'Alfloc' water treatment fitted 1954. Scrapped at Cox & Danks, Oldbury				
6003	King George IV	July 1927	July 1958	June 1962	Old Oak Common	Cardiff Canton
6003	King George IV	Involved with incident at Midgham August 1927 when bogie derailed producing redesign of bogie springing on the whole of 'King' class. Scrapped by Swindon Works				
6004	King George III	July 1927	July 1958	June 1962	Plymouth Laira	Old Oak Common
6004	King George III	Scrapped by Swindon Works.				
6005	King George II	July 1927	July 1956	November 1962	Old Oak Common	Old Oak Common
6005	King George II	'Alfloc' water treatment fitted 1954. Scrapped at Cashmore's, Great Bridge.				
6006	King George I	February 1928	June 1956	February 1962	Plymouth Laira	Wolverhampton, Stafford Road
6006	King George I	'Alfloc' water treatment fitted 1954. Scrapped by Swindon Works.				
6007	King William III	March 1928	-	March 1936	Old Oak Common	Old Oak Common
6007	King William III	Severely damaged in Shrivenham collision 15 January 1936 and condemned 5 March 1936.				
6007	King William III	March 1936	September 1956	September 1962	Old Oak Common	Wolverhampton, Stafford Road
6007	King William III	Replacement built using some parts of the original engine. 'Alfloc' water treatment fitted 1954. Scrapped at Cox & Danks, Oldbury.				
6008	King James II	March 1928	December 1958	June 1962	Plymouth Laira	Wolverhampton, Stafford Road
6008	King James II	'Alfloc' water treatment fitted 1954. Scrapped by Swindon Works.				
6009	King Charles II	March 1928	May 1956	September 1962	Old Oak Common	Old Oak Common
6009	King Charles II	'Alfloc' water treatment fitted 1954. Scrapped at Cashmore's, Newport.				
6010	King Charles I	April 1928	March 1956	June 1962	Plymouth Laira	Cardiff Canton
6010	King Charles I	Scrapped by Swindon Works.				
6011	King James I	April 1928	March 1956	December 1962	Old Oak Common	Old Oak Common
6011	King James I	'Alfloc' water treatment fitted 1954. 1,718,295 miles (2,765,328 km) recorded on withdrawal. Scrapped by Swindon Works.				
6012	King Edward VI	April 1928	February 1958	September 1962	Newton Abbot	Wolverhampton, Stafford Road
6012	King Edward VI	'Alfloc' water treatment fitted 1954. Scrapped at Cox & Danks, Oldbury				
6013	King Henry VIII	May 1928	June 1956	June 1962	Old Oak Common	Wolverhampton, Stafford Road
6013	King Henry VIII	'Alfloc' water treatment fitted 1954. Scrapped by Swindon Works				
6014	King Henry VII	May 1928	September 1957	September 1962	Newton Abbot	Wolverhampton, Stafford Road
6014	King Henry VII	Fitted with streamlining from March 1935, but all removed by January 1943 except for 'v'-shaped cab. 'Alfloc' water treatment fitted 1954. 1,830,386 miles (2,945,721 km) on withdrawal. Scrapped at Cox & Danks, Oldbury				
6015	King Richard III	June 1928	September 1955	September 1962	Old Oak Common	Wolverhampton, Stafford Road
6015	King Richard III	'Alfloc' water treatment fitted 1954. Scrapped at Cox & Danks, Oldbury.				
6016	King Edward V	June 1928	January 1958	September 1962	Plymouth Laira	Wolverhampton, Stafford Road
6016	King Edward V	'Alfloc' water treatment fitted 1954. Scrapped at Cox & Danks, Oldbury				
6017	King Edward IV	June 1928	December 1955	July 1962	Old Oak Common	Wolverhampton, Stafford Road
6017	King Edward IV	'Alfloc' water treatment fitted 1954. Scrapped at Cox & Danks, Oldbury				
6018	King Henry VI	June 1928	March 1958	December 1962	Plymouth Laira	Cardiff Canton
6018	King Henry VI	Re-instated to work last King journey under BR from Birmingham via Southall to Swindon. Scrapped by Swindon Works after attempts at preservation failed.				
6019	King Henry V	July 1928	April 1957	September 1962	Wolverhampton, Stafford Road	Wolverhampton, Stafford Road
6019	King Henry V	Scrapped at Cashmore's, Newport.				
6020	King Henry IV	May 1930	February 1956	July 1962	Plymouth Laira	Wolverhampton, Stafford Road
6020	King Henry IV	'Alfloc' water treatment fitted 1954. Scrapped at Cox & Danks, Oldbury.				
6021	King Richard II	June 1930	March 1957	September 1962	Old Oak Common	Old Oak Common
6021	King Richard II	Scrapped at Cashmore's, Newport.				
6022	King Edward III	June 1930	May 1956	September 1962	Plymouth Laira	Wolverhampton, Stafford Road
6022	King Edward III	'Alfloc' water treatment fitted 1954. Scrapped at Cox & Danks, Oldbury.				
6023	King Edward II	June 1930	June 1957	June 1962	Newton Abbot	Old Oak Common
6023	King Edward II	Acquired by Woodham Brothers Scrapyard, Barry Island, South Wales in December 1962. One pair of driving wheels deliberately cut to enable shunting within the scrap yard. Sold to Brunel Trust, Bristol Temple Meads and became the 159th engine to make it out of Barry in December 1984. After protracted preservation (with new driving wheels having been cast; the first steam locomotive in preservation to have received such treatment), the locomotive was restored and entered traffic with an official launch ceremony at Didcot on 2 April 2011.				
6024	King Edward I	June 1930	March 1957	June 1962	Plymouth Laira	Cardiff Canton
6024	King Edward I	Acquired by Woodham Brothers Scrapyard in Barry Island in December 1962. Sold to Quainton Road and left as the 36th departure from Barry March 1973. Currently owned by the Royal Scot Locomotive and General Trust, under overhaul at the West Somerset Railway.				
6025	King Henry III	July 1930	March 1957	December 1962	Old Oak Common	Old Oak Common
6025	King Henry III	Scrapped by Swindon Works.				
6026	King John	July 1930	March 1958	September 1962	Old Oak Common	Old Oak Common
6026	King John	Scrapped by Swindon Works.				
6027	King Richard I	July 1930	August 1956	September 1962	Old Oak Common	Wolverhampton, Stafford Road
6027	King Richard I	Scrapped at Cox & Danks, Oldbury.				
6028	King George VI	July 1930	January 1957	November 1962	Old Oak Common	Cardiff Canton
6028	King George VI	Originally named King Henry II, renamed January 1937. 1,663,271 miles (2,676,775 km) at withdrawal. Scrapped at Bird's, Newport. Involved in Norton Fitzwarren rail crash (1940); severely damaged but repaired.				
6029	King Edward VIII	August 1930	December 1957	July 1962	Old Oak Common	Old Oak Common
6029	King Edward VIII	Originally named King Stephen, renamed May 1936. Scrapped at Cashmore's, Newport				

== Preservation ==
King Edward II on the Mid-Norfolk Railway

As a result of its previous 7 ft 1/4 in (2,140 mm) broad-gauge system, the GWR had the largest loading gauge of all the pre-nationalisation railways in the UK. To allow for maximum power creation and resultant speed, the GWR designed the King class to its maximum mainline loading gauge, specifically a maximum height allowance of 13 feet 5 inches (4.09 m). Consequently, this restricted them as to where they could operate under both GWR and British Railways ownership.

No. 6018 King Henry VI was the subject of preservation by Sir Billy Butlin, but the plans never came to fruition and the locomotive was scrapped. Famous film actor Kenneth More expressed a desire to save the locomotive, but those plans never came into fruition.

In 1962, the recently withdrawn 6023 King Edward II and 6024 King Edward I were both initially sent to Swindon to be broken up for scrap, but, in light of a new railway bridge being installed west of Bristol, the two locomotives were coupled together and taken to the bridge for weight testing purposes. After the completion of the tests, the locomotives were sent to Woodham Brothers scrapyard at Barry, which would involve less travelling than travelling back to Swindon. This locomotive movement likely saved the locomotives from scrapping.

Developments in high-speed rail from the 1970s mean that ballast depths have increased, resulting in a present decrease in UK pan-network loading gauge height. This has recently started to be reversed with the introduction of pan-European loading gauge standards on some mainlines, mainly originating from ports. The present result of these civil engineering changes is that an original height King locomotive would not pass through various points of the modern Network Rail system, designed to a loading gauge height of 13 feet 1 inch (3.99 m).

All three preserved Kings have been on the mainline in preservation but only 6000 King George V and 6024 King Edward I have operated on the main line.

Faced with a choice of either not operating their locomotives on the mainline or modifying to allow them to pass within the current restricted UK loading gauge, private societies choose to reduce the height of their locomotives by 4 inches (102 mm) by: reducing cab and chimney height; modifying some upper pipe work. The National Railway Museum, owners of 6000 King George V, decided to keep this locomotive in its original condition.

As of 2026 one member of the class is operational: 6024 King Edward I which is also mainline certified.

Number	Image	Name	Owner	Current location	Current status	Livery	Mainline Certified	Notes
6000		King George V	National Railway Museum	STEAM - Museum of the Great Western	On static display.	BR Lined Green, Early Emblem	No	
6023		King Edward II	Great Western Society	Didcot Railway Centre	On static display. Awaiting Overhaul. Boiler Ticket Expired: 2020	BR Lined Blue, Early Emblem	No	
6024		King Edward I	Royal Scot Locomotive and General Trust	Crewe Diesel Depot	Operational. Boiler Ticket Expires: 2036	TBC	Yes, 2026-ongoing	Returned to service in 2026 following overhaul and undertook test runs in May 2026.

== Civic heraldry ==
The Borough of Swindon commissioned a new coat of arms when it became a unitary authority in 1997. The coat of arms includes an image of 6000 King George V on the shield, recognising the importance of the Swindon works in the development of Swindon. The coat of arms of the old Borough of Swindon (1900–74) included an image of GWR 3031 Class 3029 White Horse.

== Audio files ==
6024 King Edward I
Climbing Lickey Bank with help from a Class 37.

== Sources ==
- Allcock, N. J.; Davies, F. K.; le Fleming, H. M.; Maskelyne, J. N.; Reed, P. J. T.; Tabor, F. J. (June 1951). White, D. E. (ed.). The Locomotives of the Great Western Railway, part one: Preliminary Survey. Kenilworth: RCTS.
- Champ, Jim (2018). An Introduction to Great Western Locomotive Development. Barnsley: Pen & Sword Transport. ISBN 978-1-4738-7784-9. OCLC 1029234106. OL 26953051M.
- Haresnape, Brian (1978). Collett & Hawksworth Locomotives: A Pictorial History. Shepperton: Ian Allan. ISBN 0-7110-0869-8.
- le Fleming, H.M. (November 1960) [1953]. White, D.E. (ed.). The Locomotives of the Great Western Railway, part eight: Modern Passenger Classes (2nd ed.). Kenilworth: RCTS. OCLC 500544523.
- Nock, O.S. (1980). The GWR Stars, Castles and Kings: Part 1 & Part 2 (Omnibus ed.). London: David & Charles/Book Club Associates. ISBN 9780715379776.
- Nock, O.S. (1983). British Locomotives of the Twentieth Century Part 1. London: Patrick Stephens/London Book Club Associates. ISBN 0850595959.
- "The Office of Mayor" (PDF). Swindon Borough Council. Archived from the original (PDF) on 3 September 2014.
- Roden, Andrew (2010). Great Western Railway - A History. Aurum.
- Trevena, Arthur (1982) [1980]. Trains in Trouble: Vol. 1. Redruth: Atlantic Books. ISBN 0-906899-01-X.
- Whitehurst, Brian (1973). Great Western Engines, Names, Numbers, Types and Classes (1940 to Preservation). Oxford, UK: Oxford Publishing Company. pp. 55, 103, 145. ISBN 978-0-9028-8821-0. OCLC 815661.
