= King George School =

King George School may refer to:

- King George Secondary School, a secondary school in Vancouver, British Columbia, Canada
- King George School (Calgary, Alberta), an elementary school in Calgary, Alberta
- King George V School (Hong Kong), a secondary school in Hong Kong
- King George School (Sutton, Vermont), a secondary school in Sutton, Vermont
- King George High School, a high school in King George, Virginia
- King George School (Saskatoon), an elementary school in Saskatoon, Saskatchewan
