= George I =

George I is the name of:

- Patriarch George I of Alexandria (fl. 621–631)
- George I of Constantinople (died 686)
- George of Beltan (died 790)
- George I of Abkhazia (ruled 872/3–878/9)
- George I of Georgia (died 1027)
- Yuri Dolgorukiy (c. 1099–1157), George I of Kiev/Russia
- George I of Duklja, King of Duklja (1113–1118, and again 1125–1131)
- George I of Bulgaria (died 1308/9)
- Yuri I of Galicia (c. 1252–1308)
- George I of Imereti (died 1392)
- George I, Prince of Anhalt-Dessau (c. 1390–1474)
- George VIII of Georgia (1417–1476), George I of Kakheti
- George I of Münsterberg (1470–1502)
- George I of Brieg (c. 1482–1521)
- George I, Duke of Pomerania (1493–1531)
- George I of Württemberg-Mömpelgard (1498–1558)
- George I, Landgrave of Hesse-Darmstadt (1547–1596)
- George I Rákóczi (1593–1648), prince of Transylvania
- George I of Great Britain (1660–1727), also Elector of Hanover
- George I, Duke of Saxe-Meiningen (1761–1803)
- George I (Miskito) (died 1777)
- George, King of Saxony (1832–1904)
- George I of Greece (1845–1913)

== See also ==
- George Tupou I of Tonga (c. 1797–1893)
- King George (disambiguation)
