= Georg II =

Georg II may refer to:

- George II, Duke of Pomerania (1582–1617)
- George II, Landgrave of Hesse-Darmstadt (1605–1661)
- George II, Duke of Saxe-Meiningen (1826–1914)
