= Royal Scot Locomotive and General Trust =

Railway charity in the UK

The Royal Scot Locomotive and General Trust (RSL&GT) is a charitable trust set up in 2009, to enable ownership and restoration to mainline running condition of the London Midland and Scottish Railway Royal Scot Class locomotive No. 6100 Royal Scot.

The trust has since been expanded and now owns a number of mainline locomotives in various states of repair, most of which are associated with the Trust's founder, Jeremy Hosking. Furthermore, a group of companies including Locomotive Services (LSL) has been set up to encompass repair, maintenance of operation for RSL&GT and other assets.

== History ==
The RSL&GT Ltd was formed in 2009 to protect for the long term, steam locomotives capable of hauling passenger trains on both the main line and heritage railways. Set up to acquire locomotive No. 6100 Royal Scot, the Trust became a registered charity in late 2011 when it acquired Great Western Railway 4-6-0 GWR 6000 Class No. 6024 King Edward I.

The Trust's stated intent is to have representative locomotives from the following railway companies:

- London Midland and Scottish Railway
- Great Western Railway
- Southern Railway
- London and North Eastern Railway
- British Railways

RSL&GT locomotives are maintained to mainline operating standards and are operated on the mainline railways of the UK, in addition to preserved railways by Locomotive Services.

== Fleet ==
The fleet is operated by Locomotive Services.

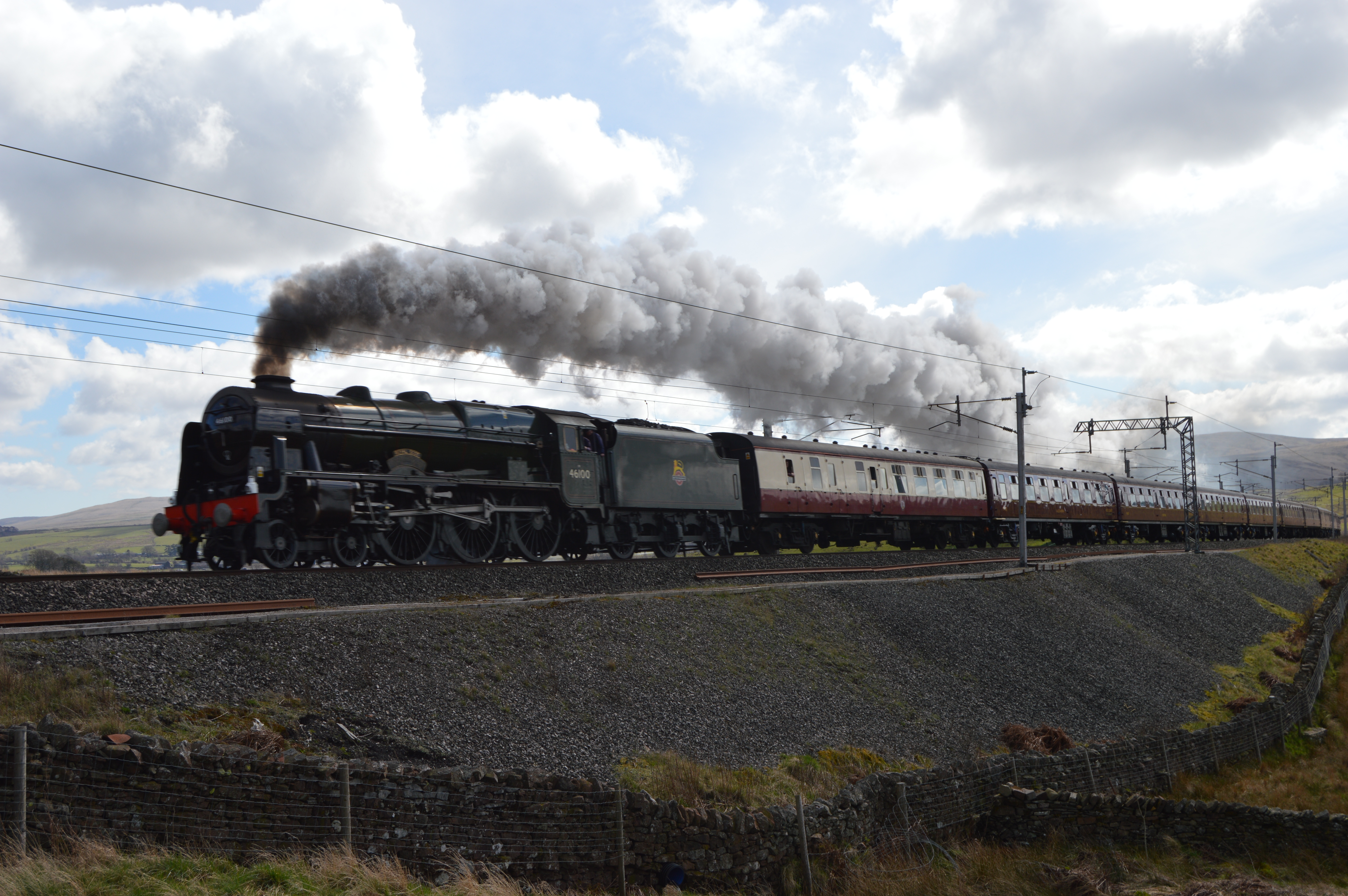
Royal Scot climbing Shap in April 2016 for the first time since her withdrawal in 1962.

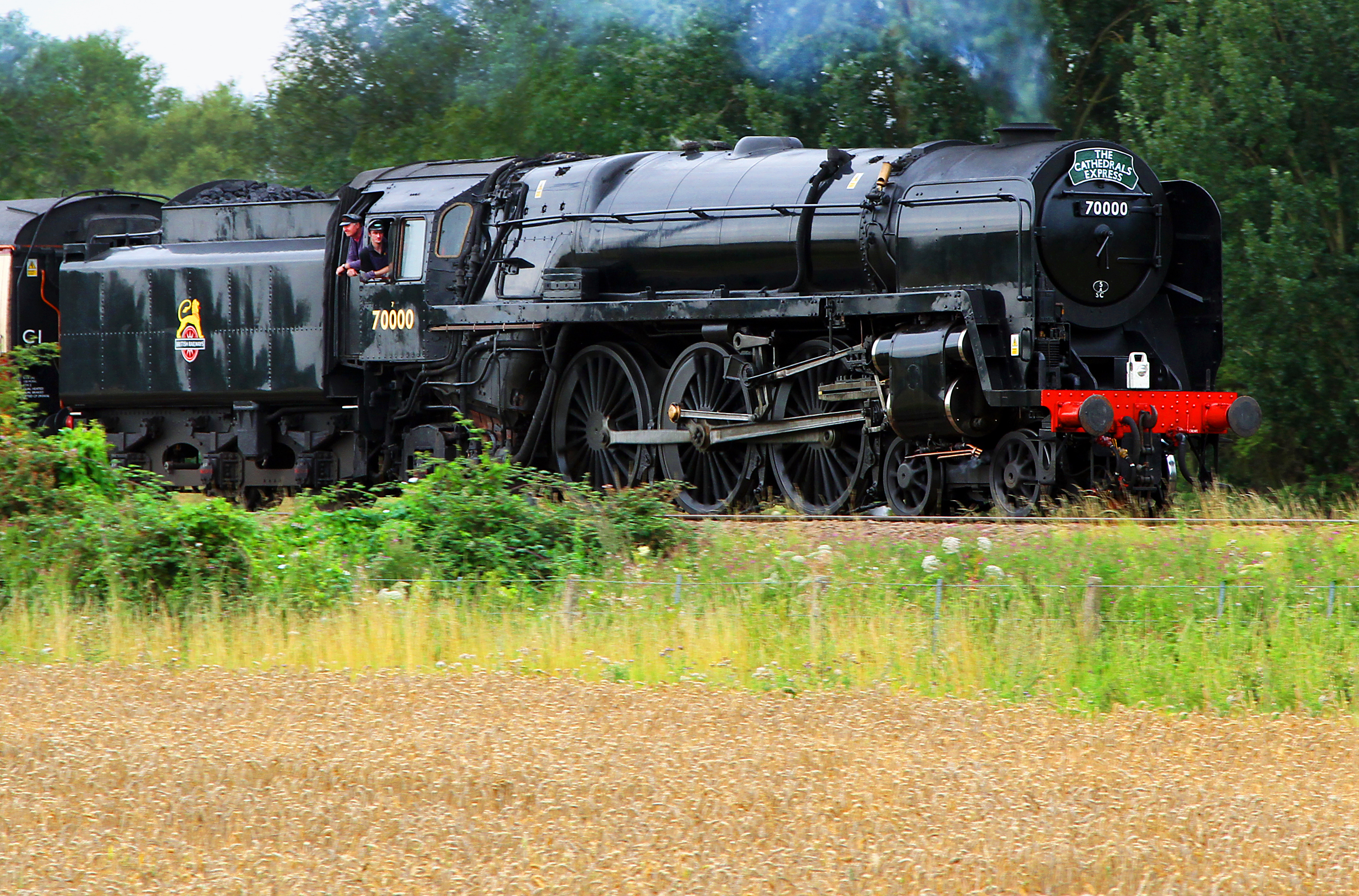
7MT Britannia in BR black.

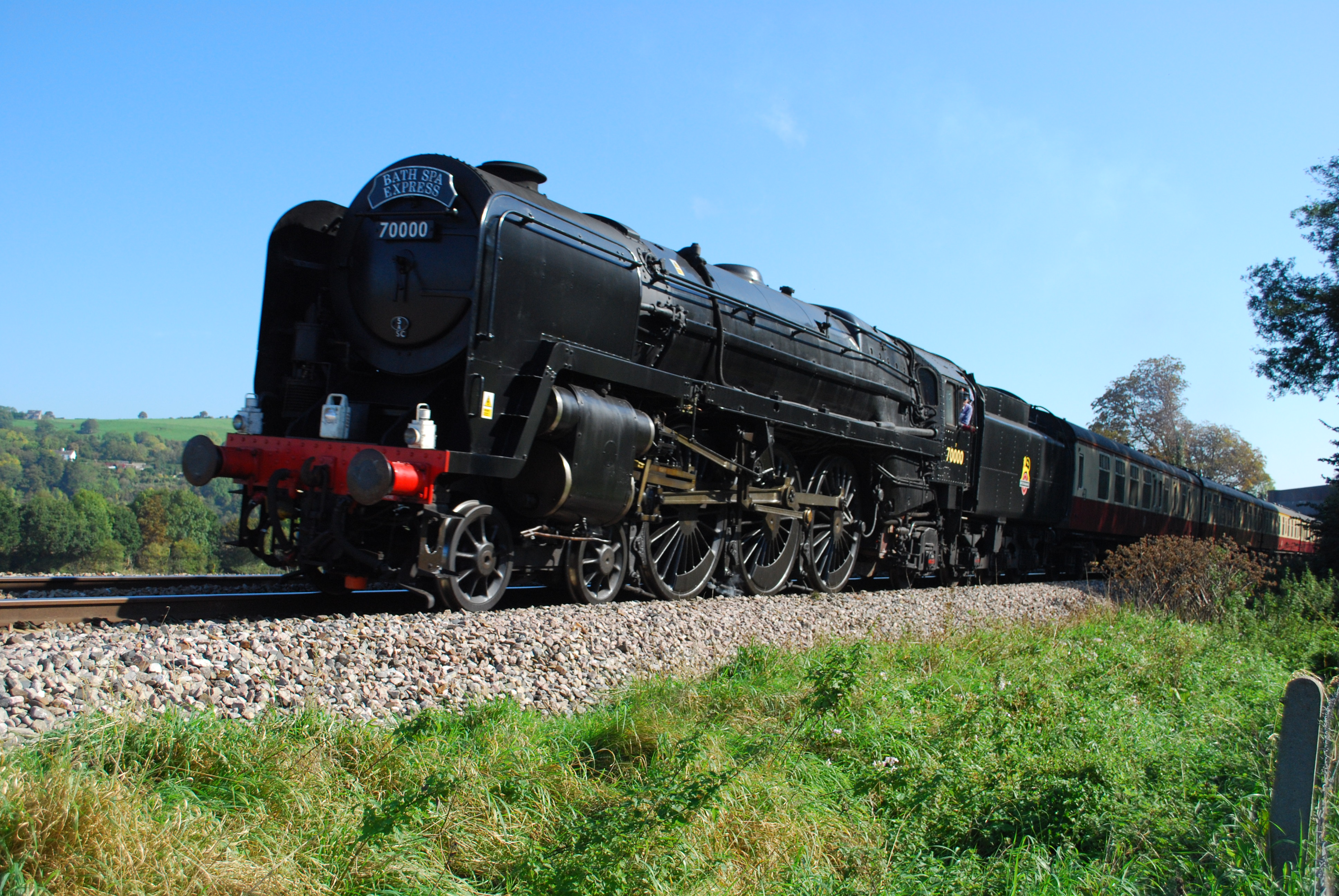
70000 7MT Britannia in BR black.
