= John Rowe (author) =

Australian author (1936–2017)

- Born: 20 March 1936; Australia
- Died: 9 November 2017 (aged 81)
- Occupation: Author

John Rowe (20 March 1936 – 9 November 2017) was an Australian author who wrote numerous war novels about his experiences in the Vietnam War.

== Early life and military ==
John Rowe, a former professional career soldier, was educated at Sydney Grammar School and was a 1957 graduate of the Royal Military College, Duntroon. Rowe started his active military service in 1958 fighting in four wars, including the Malayan Emergency, Kashmir, Borneo, and Vietnam War. Promoted to Major, by 1968 Maj. John Rowe served as an exchange officer with the American Defense Intelligence Agency and served with the 173rd Airborne Brigade Combat Team and the 1st Australian Task Force.

== Author ==
- Over the course of his career, Rowe wrote six published novels and a Time-Life history book on Australian soldiers in the Vietnam War.
- In 1968, Maj. John Rowe wrote his first novel on the Vietnam War while serving in Washington, D.C., with the Defense Intelligence Agency. The book "Count Your Dead" was published by Angus & Robertson. An article on Rowe's book written by John Miles called "Soldier’s Bitter Vietnam Book" was later published in a 16 August 1968 newspaper article for The Adelaide Advertiser in Australia.
- In 2003, "Count Your Dead" was selected by the Sydney University Press for inclusion in their Classic Works series of 25 books by Australian authors both living and dead.
- In 2012, The Australian beat writer Peter Pierce wrote an article on Rowe's book "Count Your Dead" called "Kill by Kill, Name by Name". Pierce states that Rowe condemned the vacillations and complacency of Australian politics including the foreign relations and the dependence on its major allies. Rowe resigned from the army after the book was published and returned to Australia.
- Author John Rowe is an author entry in reference book "Who’s Who of Australian Writers" ISBN 978-0909532819 and Oxford Companions book series; the 2nd Edition of "The Oxford Companion to Australian Literature" ISBN 9780195533811

== Published books ==
- Count Your Dead (1968) Publisher: Angus & Robertson ISBN 9780975086049
- McCabe PM (1972) Publisher Collins ISBN 0330234226
- The Chocolate Crucifix (1972) Publisher Wren ISBN 0858850257
- The Warlords (1978) Publisher Angus & Robertson ISBN 0207135215
- The Aswan Solution (1979) Publisher: Knopf Doubleday ISBN 9780385148665
- The Jewish Solution (1980) Publisher: Henry Holt and Company Rinehart & Winston - ISBN 0039002357
- Long Live the King (1984) Publisher Stein & Day ISBN 0812829964
- Long Live the King (1984) Publisher Rigby ISBN 0727018809
- Vietnam, the Australian experience (1987) Publisher Time-Life ISBN 0949118079
