= King George V School =

King George V School may refer to:

- King George V School (Hong Kong)
- King George V School, Seremban
- King George V College in Southport, England, known until 1979 as "King George V School"
- King George V School (Gilbert and Ellice Islands)
