= GWR 6000 Class 6000 King George V =

British steam locomotive

King George V
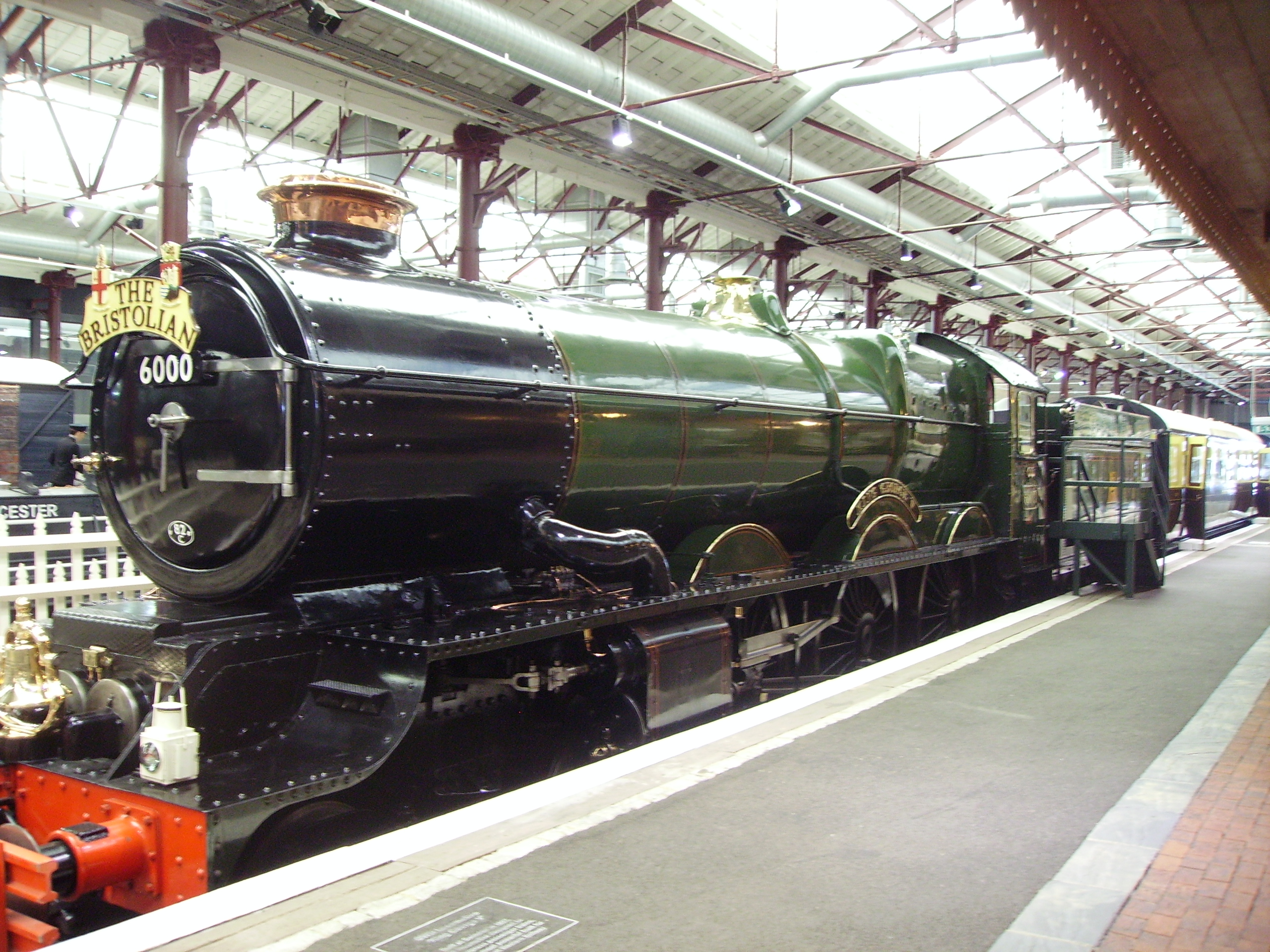
- GWR No. 6000 King George V at STEAM – Museum of the Great Western Railway, Swindon
Type and origin
- Power type: Steam
- Designer: C.B. Collett
- Builder: GWR Swindon Works
- Build date: June 1927
- Website: Great Western Railway steam locomotive 'King George V' 4-6-0 King class, No 6000, 1927
Specifications
- Configuration
  - Whyte: 4-6-0
- Leading dia.: 3 ft 0 in (0.914 m)
- Driver dia.: 6 ft 6 in (1.981 m)
- Minimum curve: 8 chains (530 ft; 160 m) normal, 7 chains (460 ft; 140 m) slow
- Length
  - Over beams: 68 ft 2 in (20.78 m)
- Width: 8 ft 11 1/2 in (2.73 m)
- Height: 13 ft 4 3/4 in (4.08 m)
- Axle load: 22 long tons 10 cwt (50,400 lb or 22.9 t) full
- Adhesive weight: 67 long tons 10 cwt (151,200 lb or 68.6 t) full
- Loco weight: 89 long tons 0 cwt (199,400 lb or 90.4 t) full
- Tender weight: 46 long tons 14 cwt (104,600 lb or 47.4 t) full
- Total weight: 135 long tons 14 cwt (304,000 lb or 137.9 t)
- Fuel type: Coal
- Fuel capacity: 6 long tons 0 cwt (13,400 lb or 6.1 t)
- Water cap.: 4,000 imp gal (18,000 L; 4,800 US gal)
- Boiler
  - Type: GWR Number 12
- Boiler pressure: 250 lbf/in^{2} (1.72 MPa)
- Heating surface
  - Firebox: 194 sq ft (18.0 m^{2})
  - Tubes: 2,008 sq ft (186.5 m^{2})
- Superheater
  - Heating area: 313 sq ft (29.1 m^{2})
- Cylinders: Four, two inside, two outside
- Cylinder size: 16.25 in × 28 in (413 mm × 711 mm)
- Valve gear: Inside cylinders: Walschaerts; Outside cylinders: derived from inside cylinders via rocking levers
- Valve type: Piston valves
Performance figures
- Tractive effort: 39,700 lbf (176.6 kN) currently
Career
- Operators: Great Western Railway/British Railways
- Class: GWR 6000 Class
- Power class: GWR: Special; BR: 8P
- Number in class: 1
- Official name: King George V
- Axle load class: GWR: Double Red
- Locale: Western Region
- Withdrawn: December 1962
- Current owner: National Railway Museum

Great Western Railway (GWR) 6000 Class King George V is a preserved British steam locomotive.

== Background ==
After developing the "new" GWR Star Class in the form of the GWR Castle Class, chief mechanical engineer Charles Collett was faced with the need to develop an even more powerful locomotive to pull 13+ carriage express trains.

Collett successfully argued with the GWR's General Manager, Sir Felix Pole, that had the axle-loading restriction of 19.5 long tons (19,800 kg) of the "Castle" class been increased to the maximum allowable of 22.5 long tons (22,900 kg), an even more powerful locomotive could have been created. Pole agreed to allow Collett to explore such a design, subject to getting tractive effort above 40,000 lbf (180,000 N).

Collett designed the "King" Class to the maximum dimensions of the original GWR 7 ft 1/4 in (2,140 mm) broad-gauge engineering used to develop its mainline, resulting in the largest loading gauge of all the pre-nationalisation railways in the UK, with a maximum height allowance of 13 feet 5 inches (4.09 m). Consequently, this restricted them as to where they could operate under both GWR and British Railways ownership. To accommodate the largest possible boiler, and to conform with Pole's requested tractive effort requirement, the "King" class were equipped with smaller 6 ft 6 in (1.981 m) main driving wheels than the "Castle" class. This resulted in both the GWR's highest-powered locomotive design, but most importantly a higher tractive effort than the "Castle". This combination allowed the "King" class to pull the now required higher-weight 13+ coach express trains from London to Bristol and onwards to the West Country, at a higher-speed timetable average than the "Castle".

With the class to be originally named after notable cathedrals, in light of the invitation to feature in the Baltimore and Ohio Railroad's centenary celebrations, the GWR decided to make them more notable by naming the class after British Kings.

== Operational career ==
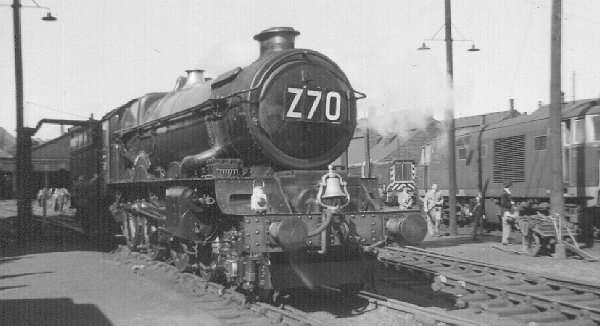
6000 King George V at Swindon having just hauled the last King-hauled train from Wolverhampton and Birmingham Snow Hill (1962). Note the bell which was given to the engine when it toured the U.S.A. This engine is now preserved.

As the first of the class, No. 6000 was specifically named after the then monarch of the United Kingdom King George V. Built at Swindon Works and completed in June 1927, following a period of running in, the locomotive was shipped to the United States in August 1927, to feature in the Baltimore and Ohio Railroad's centenary celebrations. During the celebrations it was presented with a bell and a plaque, and these are carried to this day. This led to it being affectionately known as "The Bell". The bell carries the inscription:

Presented to

Locomotive King George V
by the
Baltimore & Ohio Railroad Company
in commemoration of its
centenary celebration
24 September – 15 October 1927

After returning from the U.S.A., it was allocated to Old Oak Common. Moved by British Railways to Bristol in 1950, it was returned to Old Oak Common in 1959, and withdrawn from service by the Western Region of British Railways in December 1962 after covering 1,910,424 miles (3,074,529 km).

== Preservation ==
The locomotive was officially preserved as part of the national collection. It was restored to main line running order at the Bulmer's Railway Centre in Hereford. Operationally based at Hereford, in 1971 it became the very first steam locomotive to break the British Railways mainline steam ban that had been in place since the completion of the Fifteen Guinea Special in 1968. Its restoration to main line service and subsequent operation is often credited with opening the door for the return of steam to the mainlines of the UK.

The engine took part in the GWR 150 celebrations in 1985 hauling railtours, one trip which took place on 7 April was "The Great Western Limited" which was running from London Paddington to Plymouth via Bristol was booked to be worked by No. 6000 while double heading with No. 7819 Hinton Manor. Both engines were to double head the train from Bristol to Plymouth on the outward journey but No. 6000 was failed in Taunton with a hot box and had to be taken off the train. No. 7819 Hinton Manor continued alone with the train, but that would too later be failed in Exeter with a hot box.

After years of running, a costly overhaul of the locomotive was declined by the National Railway Museum. In part, this was due to the fact that, since its second renovation, a second class-member King Edward I had been restored for mainline operation. In addition, the higher ballast beds in place on the Western Region since the early 1980s, to allow for the high speed running of the InterCity 125 train sets, have greatly reduced the running-level loading gauge of the former GWR mainline – especially under bridges – to 13 feet 1 inch (3.99 m), so enabling mainline running of a "King" class now requires a reduction in the height of the original GWR-built chimney, cab and safety valve bonnets by 4 inches (100 mm), as had been done on the restoration of King Edward I. No. 6000 is the only one of the three preserved "King" class locomotives to retain its original-built full-height fittings.

After closure of the Bulmer's Steam Centre in 1990, No. 6000 moved to the Swindon "Steam" Railway Museum. In 2008, it swapped places with No. 92220 Evening Star, and became resident at the National Railway Museum. In late 2015, No. 6000, along with City of Truro, returned to STEAM – Museum of the Great Western Railway (located at the site of the old railway works in Swindon), and both were put on display in preparation for Swindon 175 (in 2016), celebrating 175 years since the inception of Swindon as a railway town. Both locomotives are expected to remain at Swindon for 5 years.

== Gallery ==
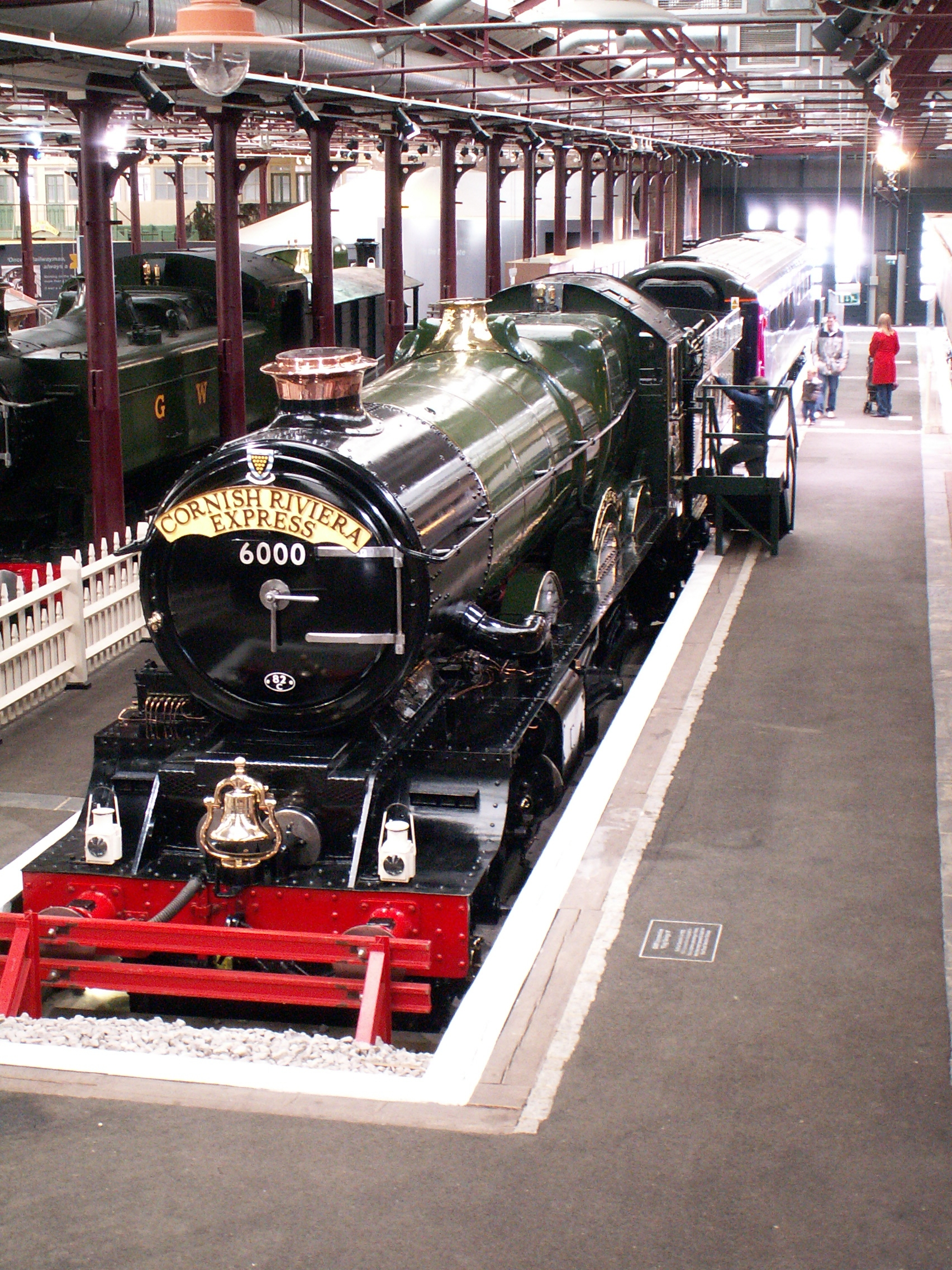
As was displayed as a static exhibit at the Swindon 'Steam' Railway Museum

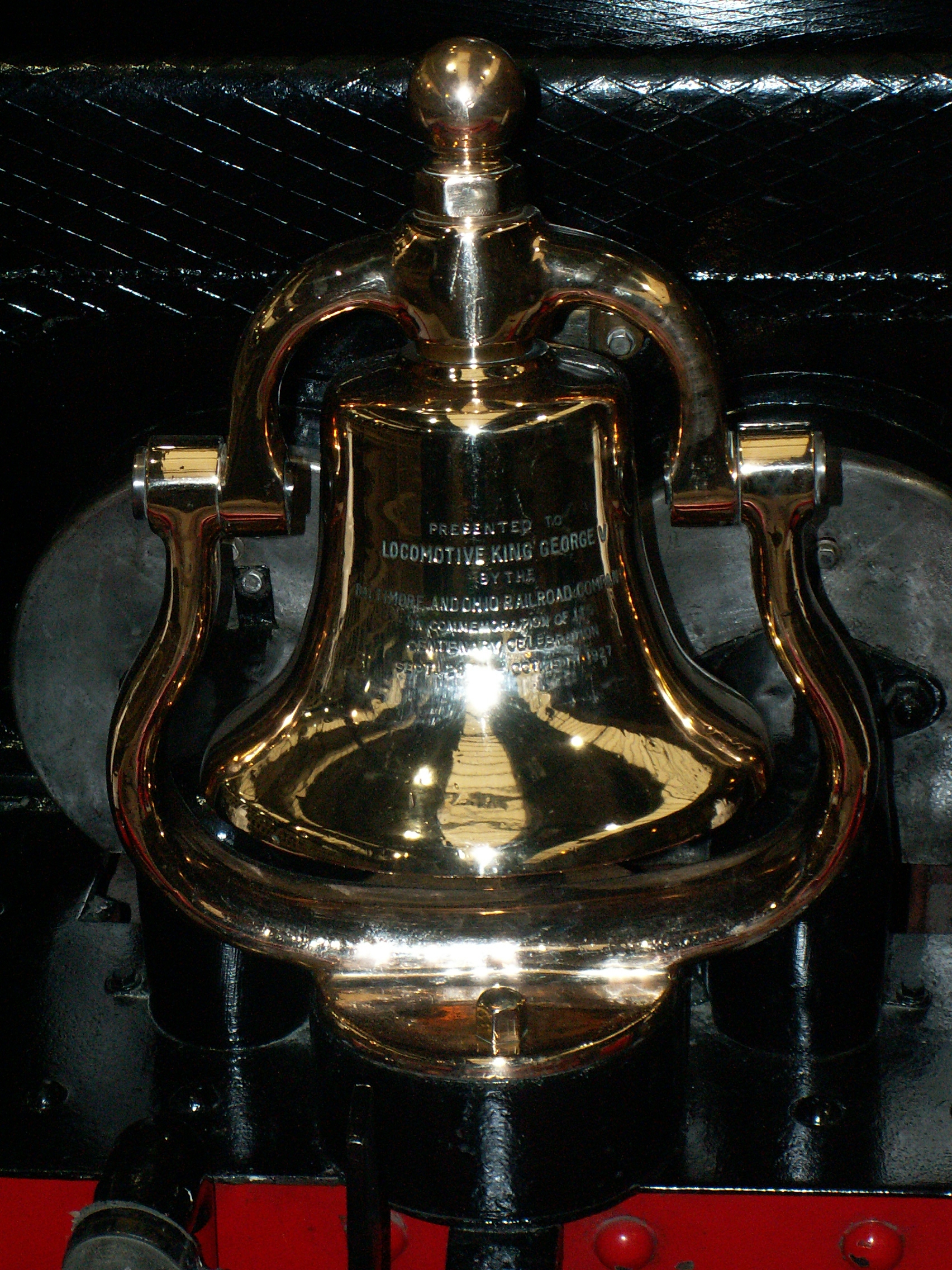
Close-up of the bell

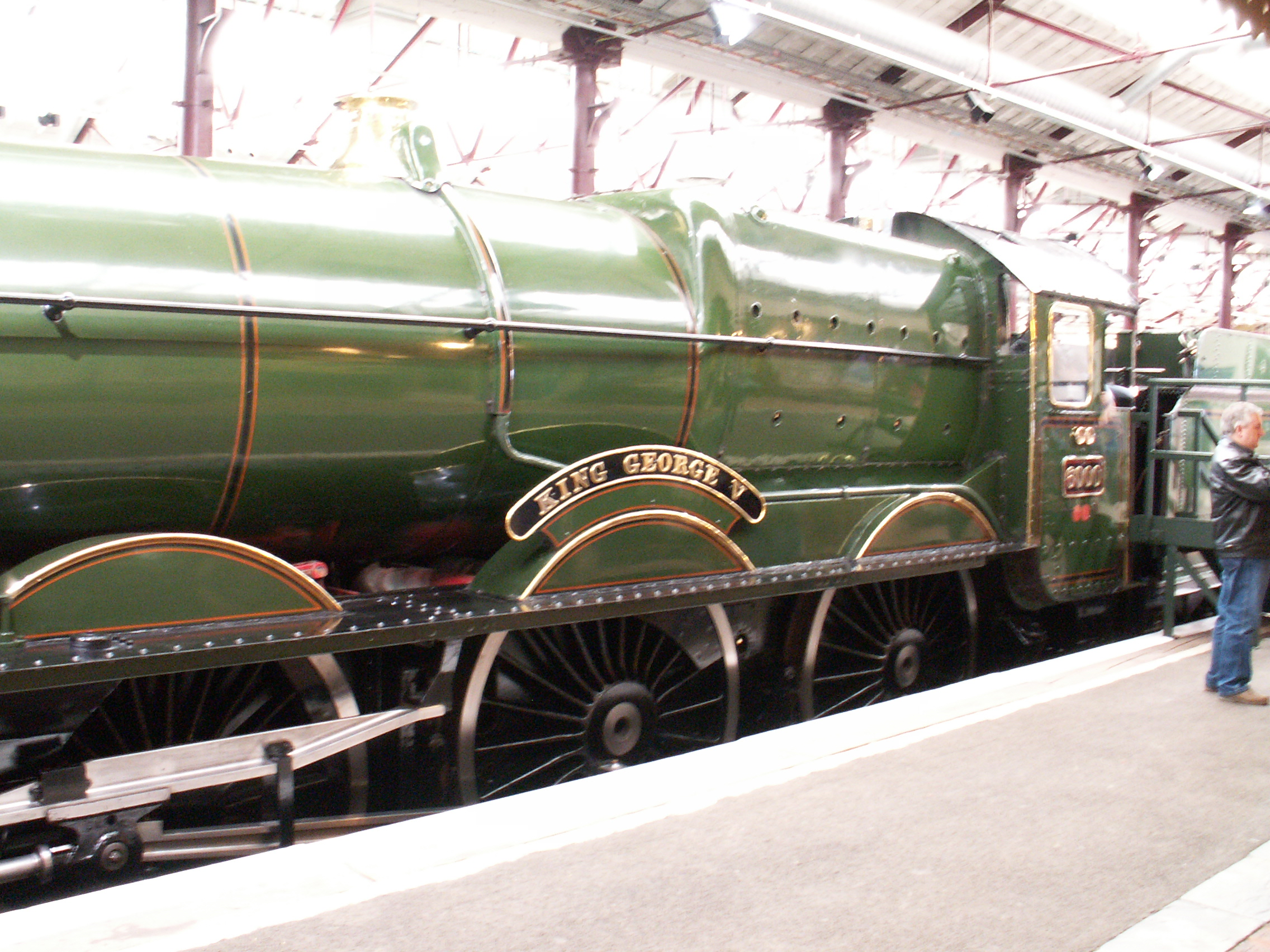
Nameplate

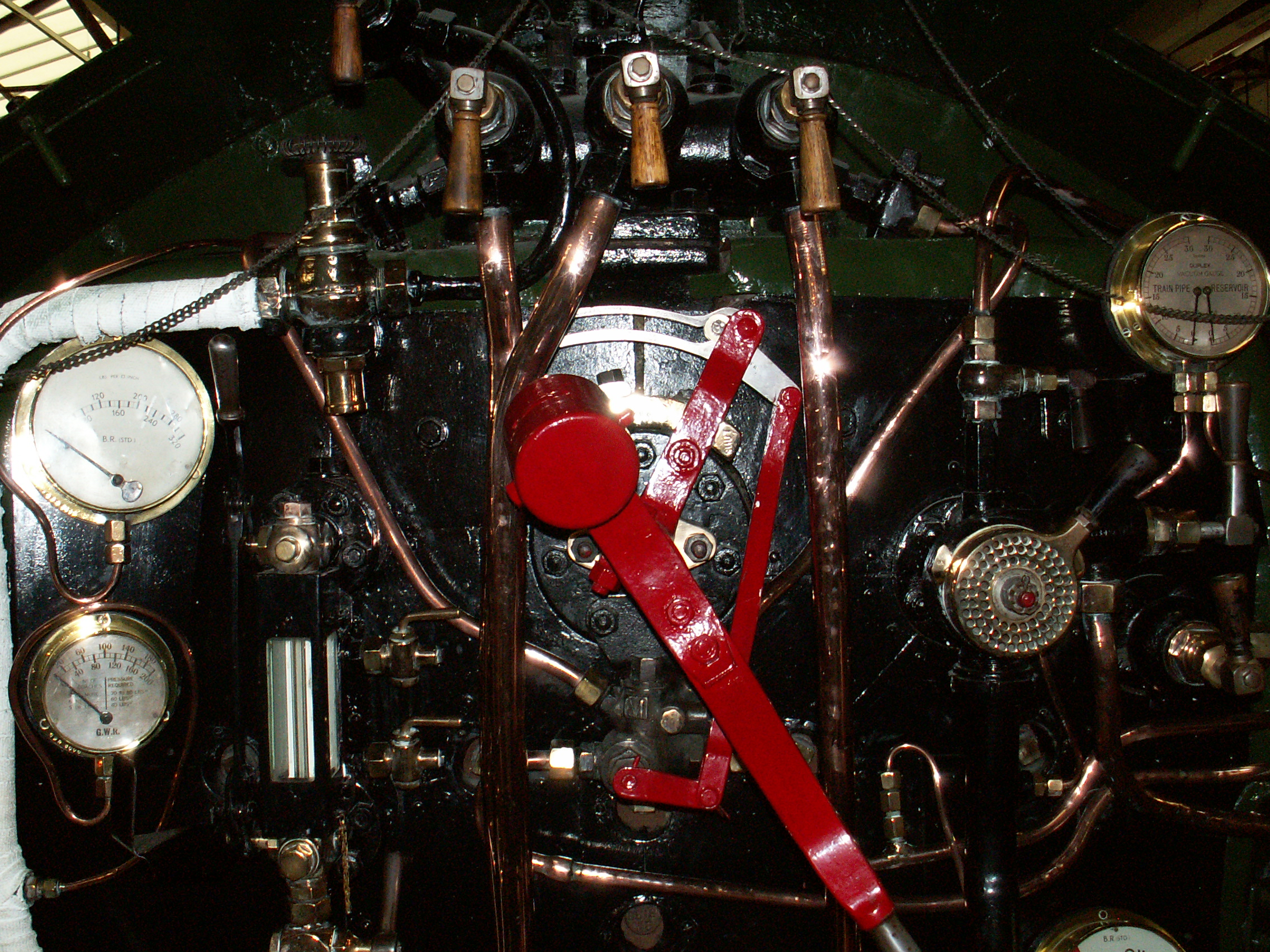
Part of the backhead

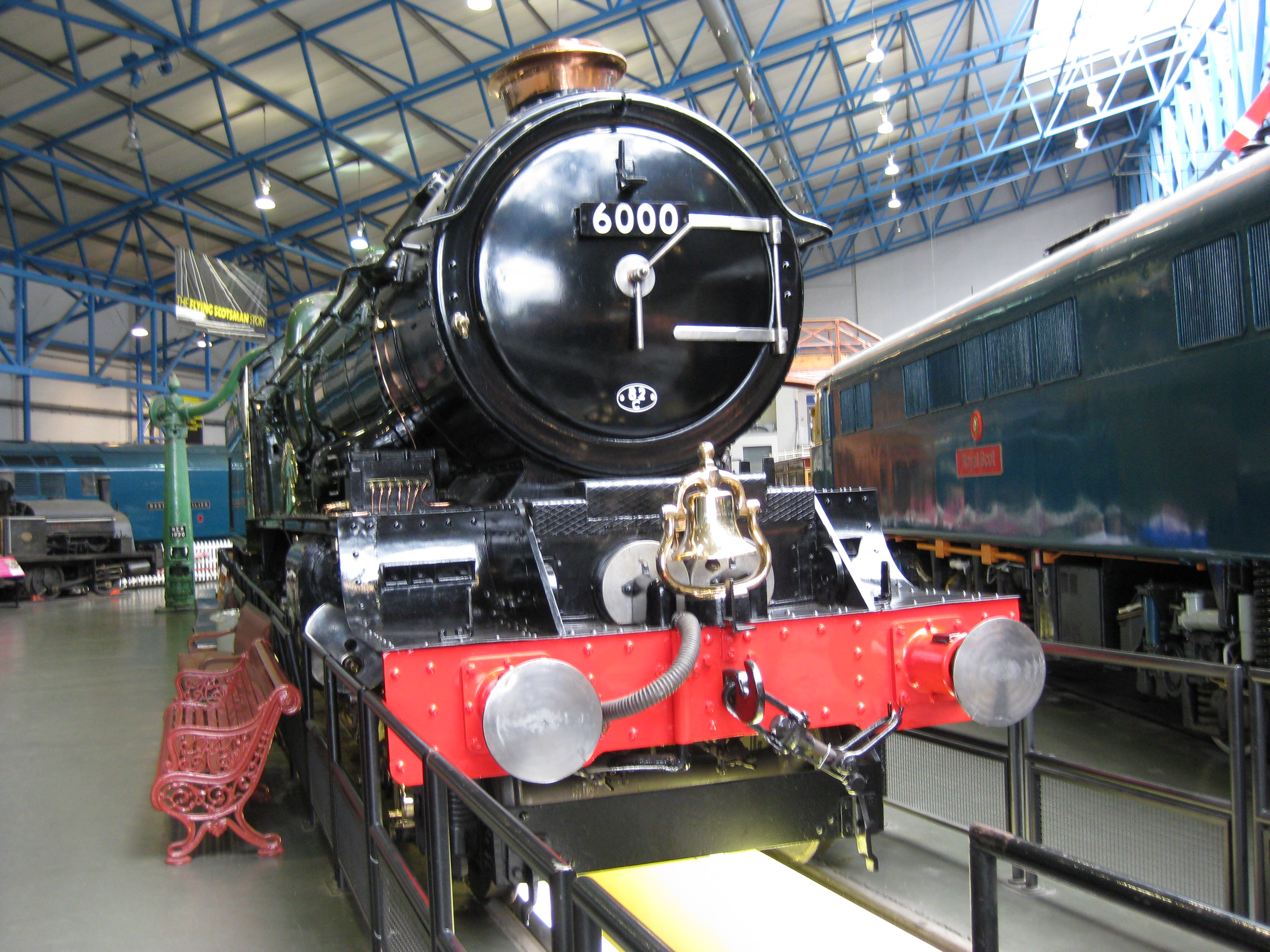
King George V at National Railway Museum, York.
