= Santa Sofia, Venice =

Church building in Venice, Italy

Santa Sofia
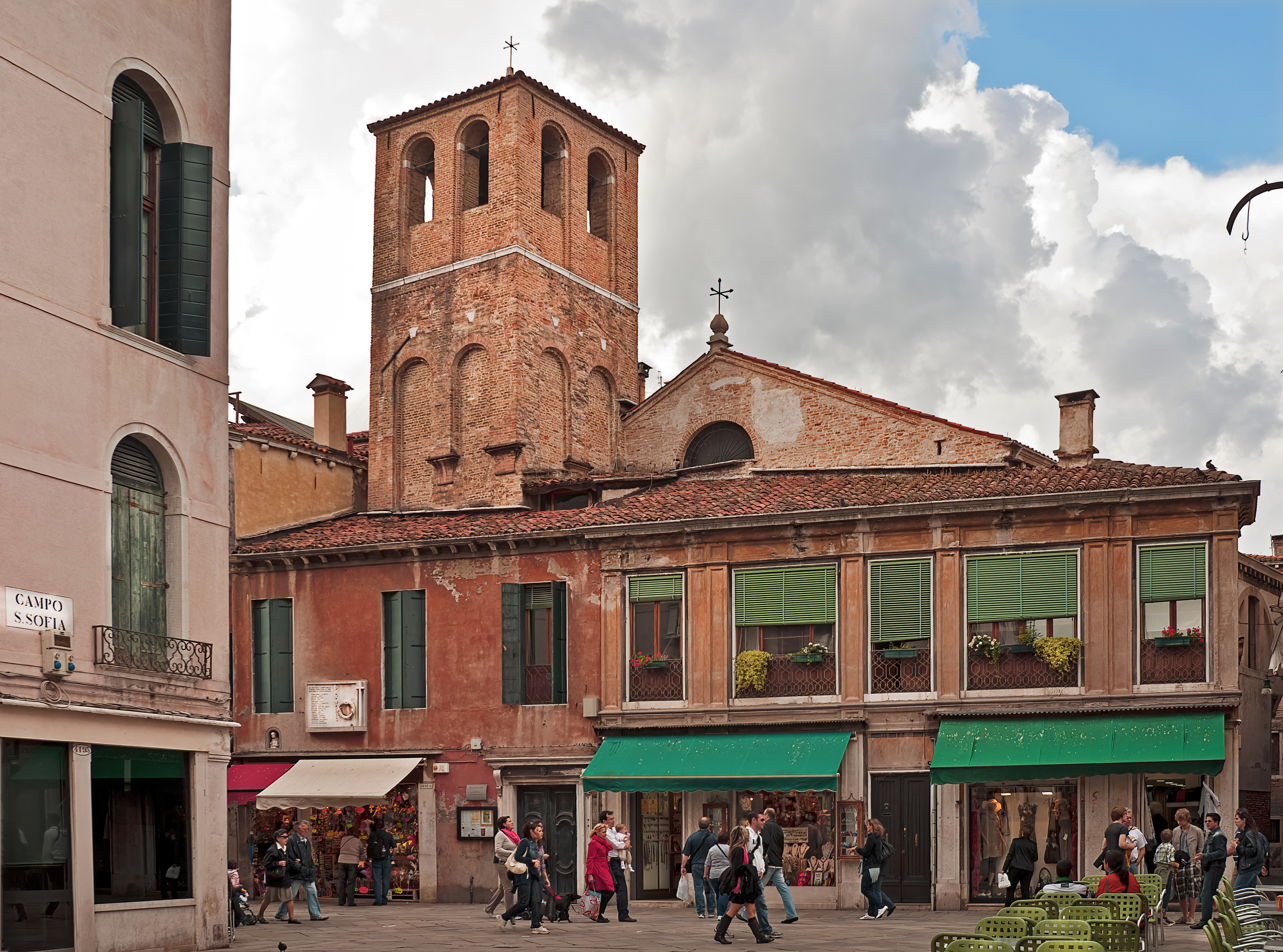
- Church seen from Strada Nova.

- Location within Venice Location within Italy

Religion
- Affiliation: Roman Catholic
- Province: Venice

Location
- Location: Venice, Italy
- Coordinates: 45°26′28″N 12°20′06″E

Architecture
- Groundbreaking: 1020

Santa Sofia is a church located in the sestiere (neighborhood) of Cannaregio in Venice, Italy. It should be distinguished from the palazzo Ca' d'Oro on the Grand Canal is also called the Palazzo Santa Sofia.

A wooden church of Sant Sofia in Venice is documented in chronicles from 886 The church dates to initial patronage in the 11th century by the patrician family of the Gussoni. Construction began in 1020. It appears to have survived the great fire of 1105 in Venice. Major reconstruction took place from 1507 to 1534. The architect of a late-1600s reconstruction was Antonio Gaspari.

With the construction of the Strada Nova in Venice in the 1800s, the church's length was diminished. Under Napoleonic rule, the rites in the church were suppressed. The church was converted into a warehouse, and the contents were dispersed. Fontana recounts how in 1836 the church was " redeem(ed) from the Israelites into whose hands it had fallen, and cleared of the debris. " In 1836, the church was re-consecrated for Roman Catholic services. Presently, the ground floor of the facade and bell tower of the church are screened behind a screen of buildings.

The interior is less decorated than in the past. Originally a Last Supper by Paolo Veronese was located on the door leading to the Sacristy. Across from this canvas was a Birth of the Virgin by Titian. The main chapel had an altarpiece of Christ preaching to the Masses by Francesco da Ponte. Above the door, called that of St Peter, was a Crucifixion by Tintoretto. In the pulpit was a canvas by Domenico Tintoretto, depicting, the Marriage of the Virgin. On the organ covers were paintings of Adoration of the Shepherds attributed to Francesco and Leandro Bassano; these works are now attributed to Palma the Elder and are now in the Gallerie dell'Accademia of Venice. Other works included altarpieces by Gentile da Fabriano, Lionardo Corona, and Baldassare d'Anna. A Madonna and saints was painted by Giovanni Segala. The altarpiece of San Lorenzo Giustiniani was painted by Angelo Trevisani. A Baptism of Christ was painted by Daniele Heinz (Daniel Ens), brother of Joseph Ens.

In the reduced size of the church after 1836 were housed a Madonna and Saints by Giovanni Battista Maganza; a St Anthony of Padua by Girolamo Brusaferro, a Christ in the Temple and an Adoration of the Magi by Leandro Bassano. In the small chapel beside the main door is a painting by Jacopo Palma the Elder. It also had an altarpieces by Pietro Moro. Likely most of these paintings were not originally in this church, nor have they been retained.

Presently in this church are two paintings by Bassano's school: at the side of the presbytery, and a Baptism of Christ, now attributed to Girolamo Heinz, is now on the main altar. Four statues of saints, attributed to Antonio Rizzo, were relocated from the church of the Servi.
