= Polyptych of Saint Barbara (Palma Vecchio) =

1520s altarpiece painted by Palma Vecchio

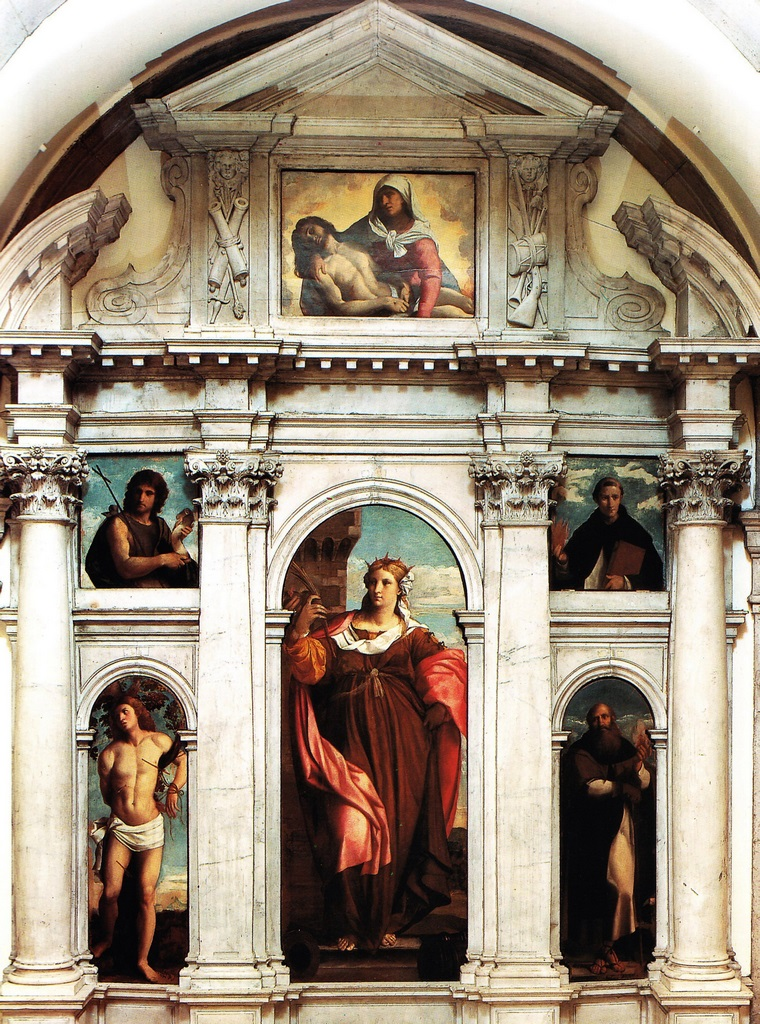
The Polyptych of Saint Barbara

The Polyptych of Saint Barbara (Italian: Polittico di Santa Barbara) was painted by Palma Vecchio in the early 1520s as the altarpiece for the Venetian church of Santa Maria Formosa. It is a composition of six panels, with Saint Barbara in the centre, under the dead Christ, and to the right and left Saints Dominic (or Vincent Ferrer), Sebastian, John the Baptist and Anthony the Abbot. The central panel of Saint Barbara is considered by many to be one of Palma's greatest achievements.

== History ==
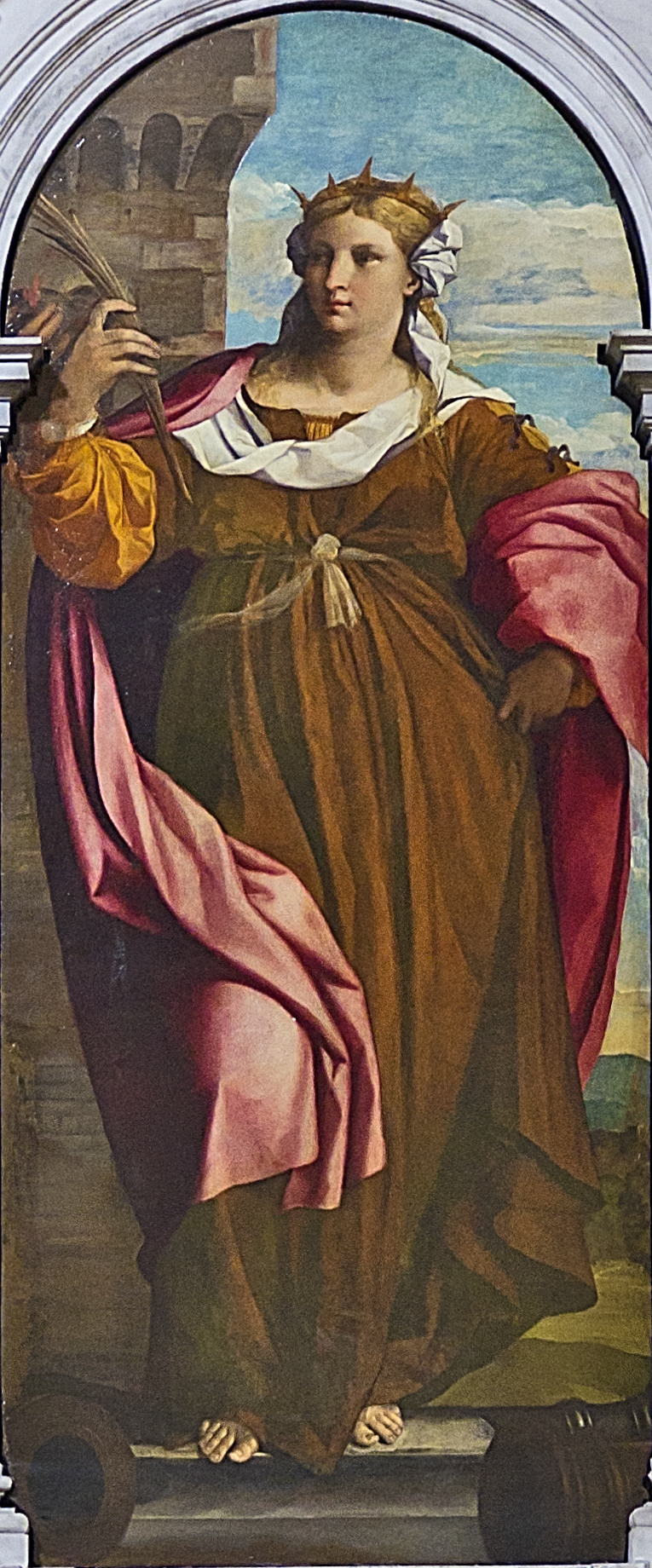
Saint Barbara

This altarpiece was painted in Palma Vecchio's middle or Giorgionesque period, at the request of the Bombardieri, the heavy artillerymen of Venice, for the altar of their chapel in the Church of Santa Maria Fomosa at Venice, where it still occupies its original place. The execution of the work was entrusted to Jacopo Palma, called II Vecchio, lit. 'the old', to distinguish him from his grand-nephew. Saint Barbara is the patroness of soldiers, and for that reason her form was chosen to decorate the altar of the chapel where the artillerists offered their prayers for her protection in war, and to give thanks for victories. The work was made in about 1523 or 1524.

== Description ==
The work was executed in oils on six wood panels. Saint Barbara fills the central and largest panel of the altarpiece, standing upon her plinth or pedestal. Her robe of brown and her flowing mantle of red infold her form, a white veil is twisted among the tresses of her golden hair, she holds in her hand a palm branch, symbolic of victory, and on her head she wears a royal diadem or crown emblematic of her martyrdom.

Saint Barbara was said to have been a Greek Egyptian of Helopolis. Palma has painted at her feet on either side a cannon, and behind her, outlined against the sky, the fortress tower in which she was said to have been imprisoned by her father, who ordered her to be shut up within its walls that her beauty might not attract suitors. The Golden Legend relates that while thus confined she was converted to Christianity by a disciple of the learned Origen, who, disguised as a physician, came at her request to instruct her in the tenets of the new faith, reports of which had reached her ears. After her baptism, she requested to have three windows made in her tower in recognition of the Trinity, but her father, in his anger at this acknowledgment of her belief, would have killed her with his sword had not angels concealed her and borne her to a place of safety. Her hiding spot was, however, revealed to him by treachery, and she was thrown into a dungeon and finally beheaded.

On both sides of this figure are panels on which are represented respectively: to the left, Saint Sebastian; to the right, Saint Anthony Abbot; above these are half-length figures of Saint John the Baptist and Saint Dominic (or Saint Vincent Ferrer), with a Pietà in a lunette between. These figures are on a smaller scale than the central panel of Saint Barbara. The panels are currently displayed in a carved stone frame which was made in the eighteenth century.

== Appraisal ==
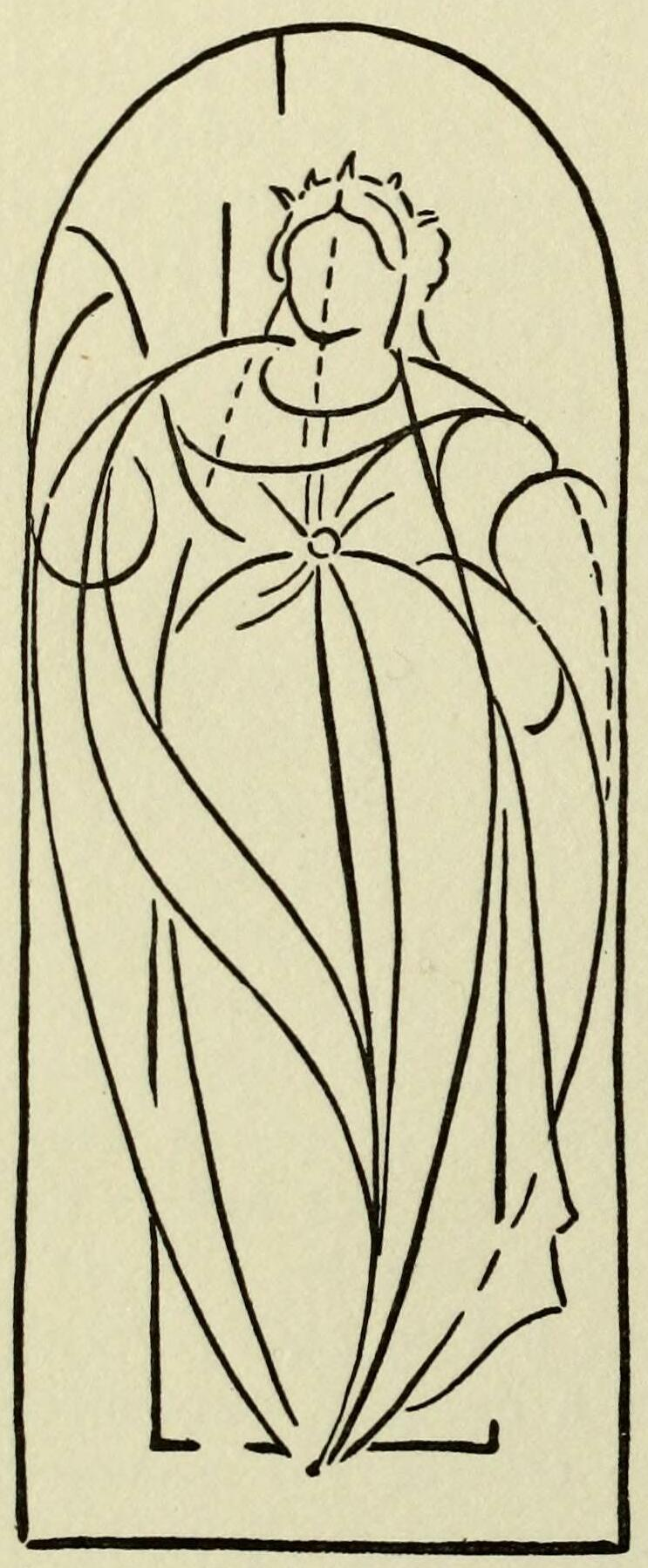
A tracing of the main lines of composition in Saint Barbara

Saint Barbara has been considered by many to be one of Palma's greatest works. French writer and draughtsman Charles Yriarte wrote in 1877 that he could not pass by the church of Santa Maria Formosa without stopping for a moment at least "to pay his devotions to the lovely patroness of the gunnery of the Most Serene Republic … with all the noble serenity of a saint who is still a woman".

According to the German art historian Adolf Philippi, writing in 1905, only once did Palma "rise to a great, an almost monumental style", and that was when he painted for the Venetian artillerists the altarpiece for their chapel in the Church of Santa Maria Formosa at Venice, with Saint Barbara upon the central panel, "a figure so truly grand that it is worthy to rank with the finest ideal creations of Italian painting." Julia Cartwright considers the "queenly form" of Saint Barbara, in crimson robes with a crown on her head and a palm in her hand, to be one of Palma's "grandest creations".

In describing Palma Vecchio's altarpiece, Crowe and Cavalcaselle say, "No other of his works combines in a higher measure vigour and harmony of tint with boldness of touch and finished blending. Nowhere is he more fortunate in reproducing the large, soft rounding to which he so usually inclines; in no other instance has he realized more clever chiaroscuro." And in the opinion of one of Vasari's editors, Palma, in this altarpiece, "left a picture which for completeness, dignity, decorative feeling, and depth of colour may be ranked with the great masterpieces of the Venetian school."

=== Tracing ===
In 1913 Henry Turner Bailey published a tracing of the principal lines of Saint Barbara (reproduced right) with the following explanation: "Around a central temperate reversed curve the others are grouped. They spring upward like the lines of some graceful lily, from a point beneath the feet of the saint, now in almost symmetrical pairs, outlining the hips and the shoulders, now in playful reversed curves, tangent to these or crossing them at the most agreeable angles. Strong verticals and horizontals near the base repeat the perpendiculars of the frame; the arching curves of the shoulders and of the head echo the circumscribing line of the top of the picture."

== Allusions ==
In George Eliot's Middlemarch, the narrator at one point compares Dorothea, the heroine of the novel, to "a picture of Santa Barbara looking out from her tower into the clear air"—identified by Mario Praz with Palma's Saint Barbara, which the author had seen whilst visiting Venice in 1860 and recorded in her diary.

== Panels ==
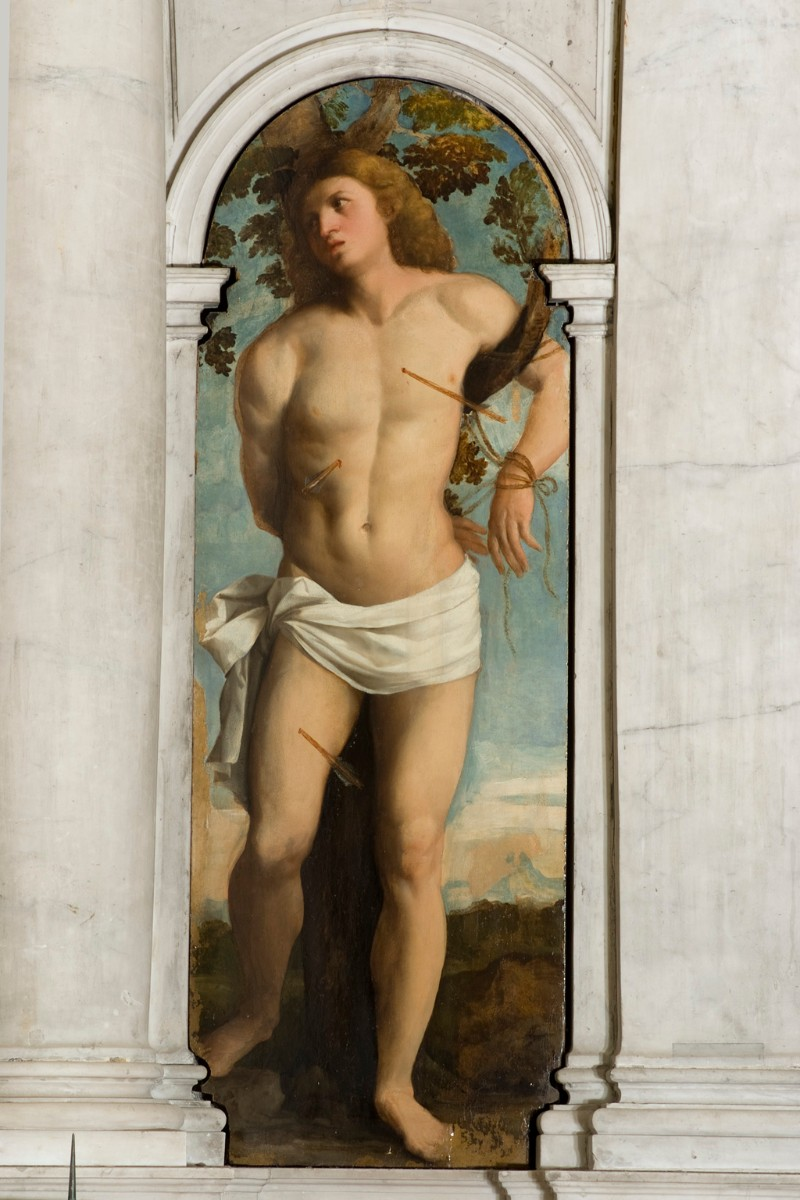
Sebastian, 138 x 48 cm

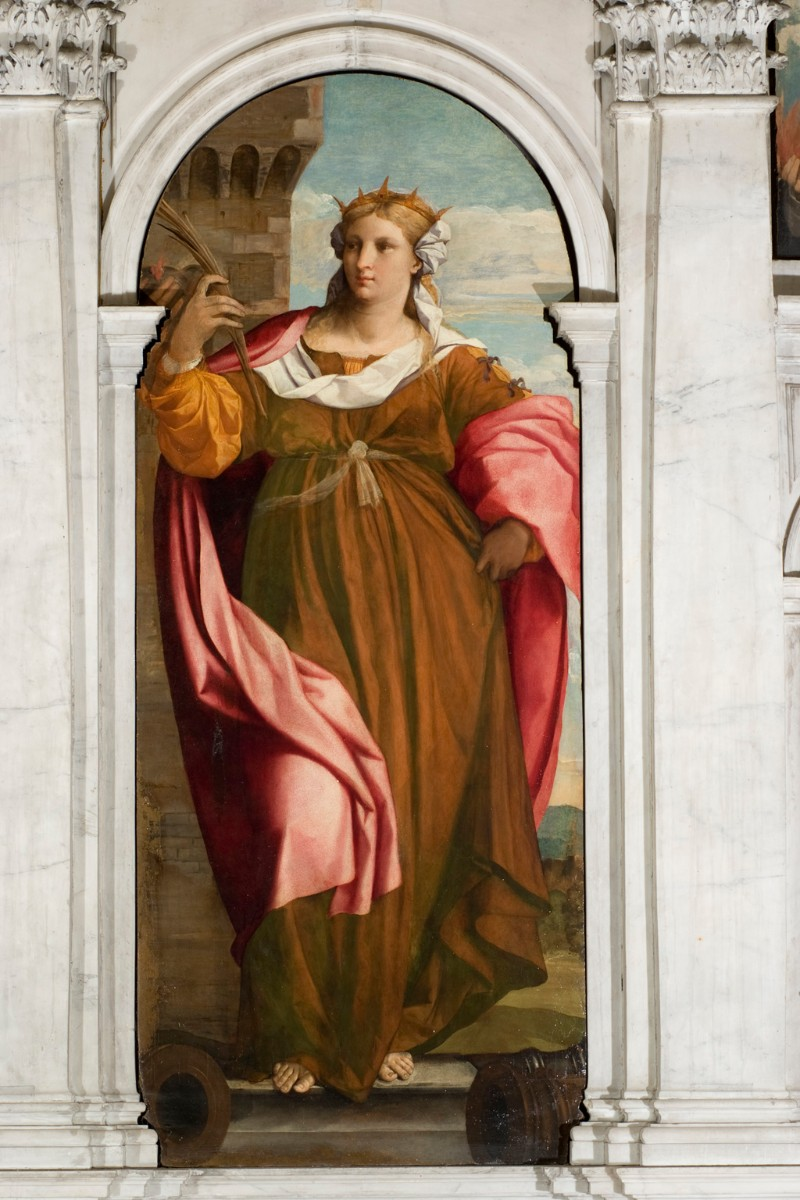
Barbara, 214 x 85 cm

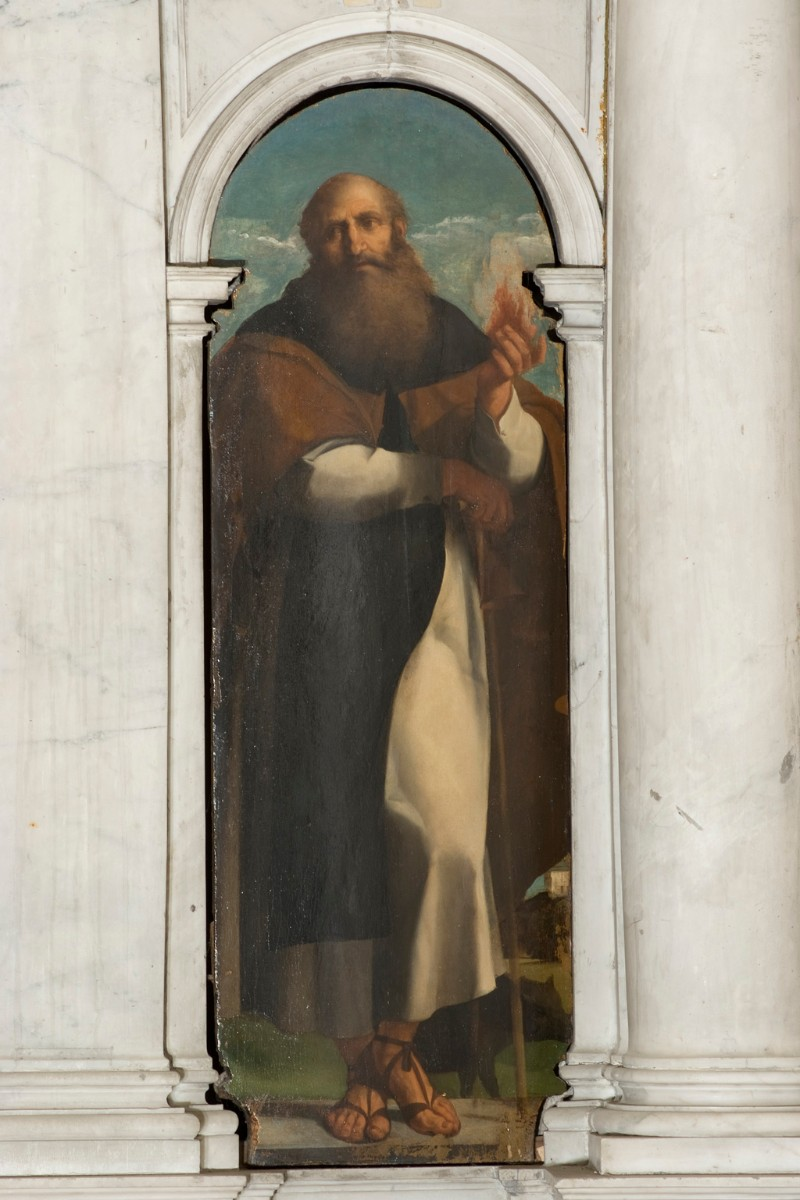
Anthony, 138 x 45 cm

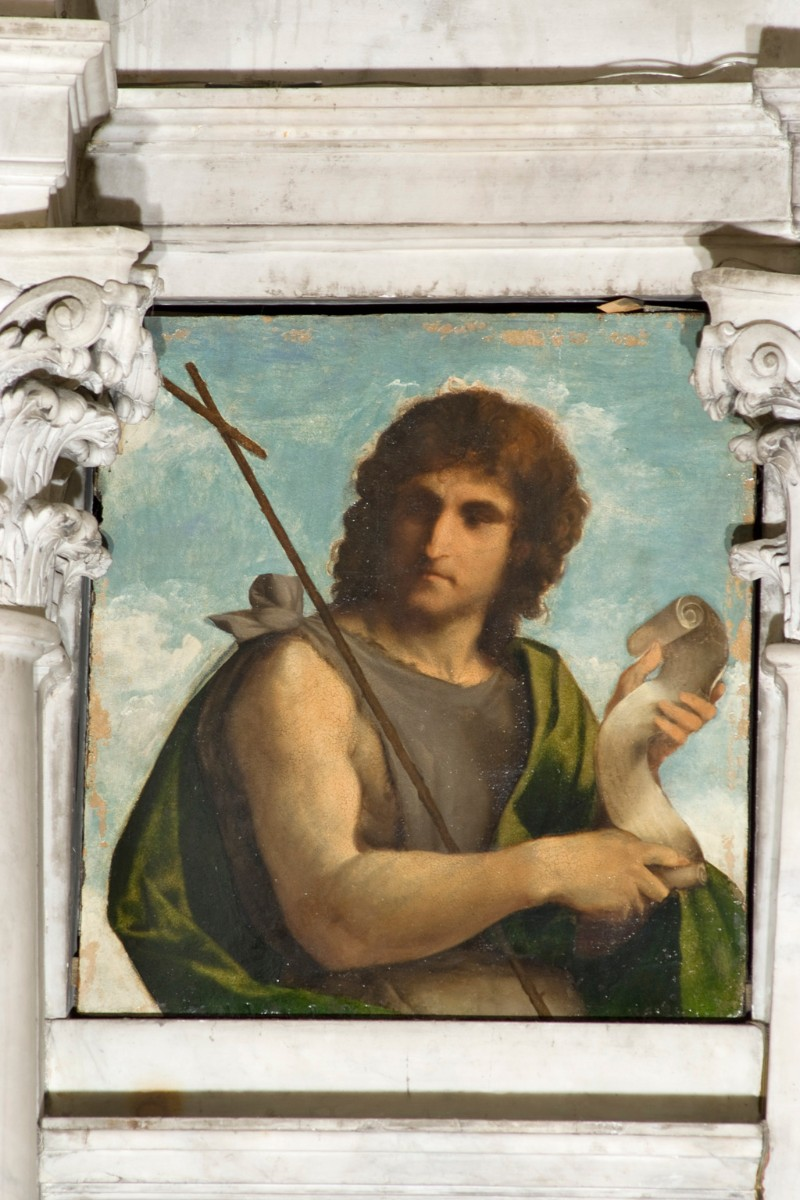
John the Baptist, 62 x 58 cm

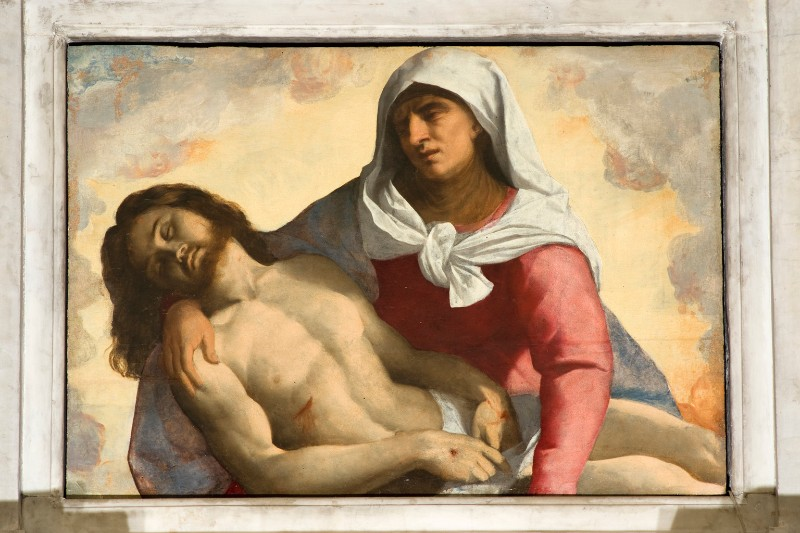
Jesus and Mary (Pietà), 63 x 89 cm

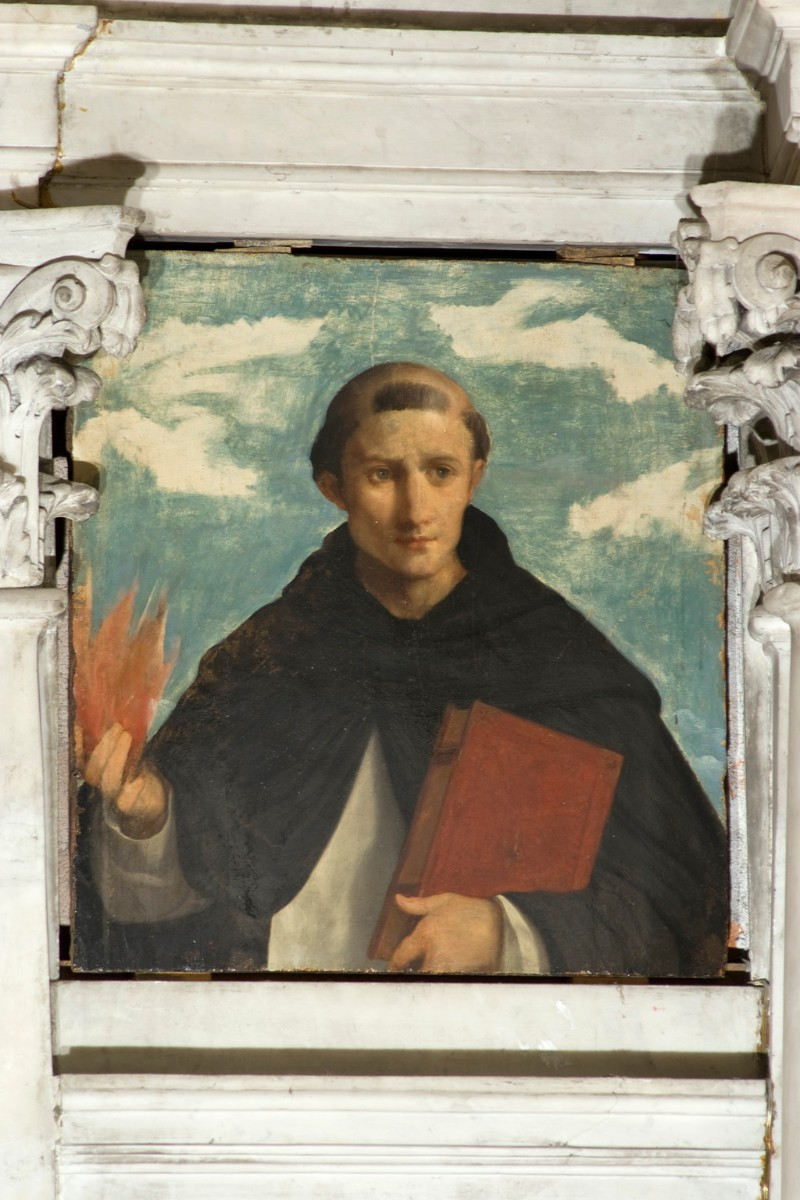
Vincent Ferrer (Dominic), 62 x 58 cm

== Sources ==
- Bailey, Henry Turner (1913). "V. Saint Barbara By Palma Vecchio". Twelve Great Paintings: Personal Interpretations. Norwood, MA: The Plimpton Press. The Prang Company. pp. 27–30.
- Cartwright, Julia, ed. (1897). Christ & His Mother in Italian Art. London: Bliss, Sands & Co. p. 108.
- Cross, J. W., ed. (1885). George Eliot's Life as Related in Her Letters and Journals. Vol. 2. Edinburgh and London: William Blackwood and Sons. p. 244.
- Eliot, George (1874). Middlemarch, A Study of Provincial Life. 2nd ed. Edinburgh and London: William Blackwood and Sons. Bk. I. Chap. x. p. 62.
- Morris, Roderick Conway (14 May 2015). "Venetian Master Finally Gets His Own Show". The New York Times (online ed.). Retrieved 5 February 2023.
- Philippi, Adolf (February 1905). "Die Kunst der Renaissance in Italien" (Abridged from the German). Masters in Art, Vol. 6, Part 62 (Palma Vecchio). Boston: Bates & Guild Co. p. 27.
- Praz, Mario (1956). The Hero in Eclipse in Victorian Fiction (Translated from the Italian by Angus Davidson). Great Britain: Geoffrey Cumberlege, Oxford University Press. p. 358.
- Rossetti, William Michael (1911). "Palma, Jacopo". In Chisholm, Hugh (ed.). Encyclopædia Britannica. Vol. 20 (11th ed.). Cambridge University Press. pp. 642–643.
- Swarzenski, Georg (1946). "Saint Barbara". Bulletin of the Museum of Fine Arts, 44(256): pp. 50–52.
- Witemeyer, Hugh (1979). George Eliot and the Visual Arts. New Haven and London: Yale University Press. pp. 87, 210, fig. 11.
- Yriarte, Charles (1896). Venice: Its History, Art, Industries and Modern Life. (Translated from the French by F. J. Sitwell). Philadelphia: Henry T. Coates & Co. pp. 201, 260, 380.
- "Jacopo Palma il Vecchio's Polyptych of Saint Barbara at Santa Maria Formosa". Save Venice. Retrieved 26 January 2023.
- Masters in Art, Vol. 6, part 62 (Palma Vecchio). Boston: Bates & Guild Co., February 1905. pp. 34–35.
