= Leonardo Corona =

Italian painter

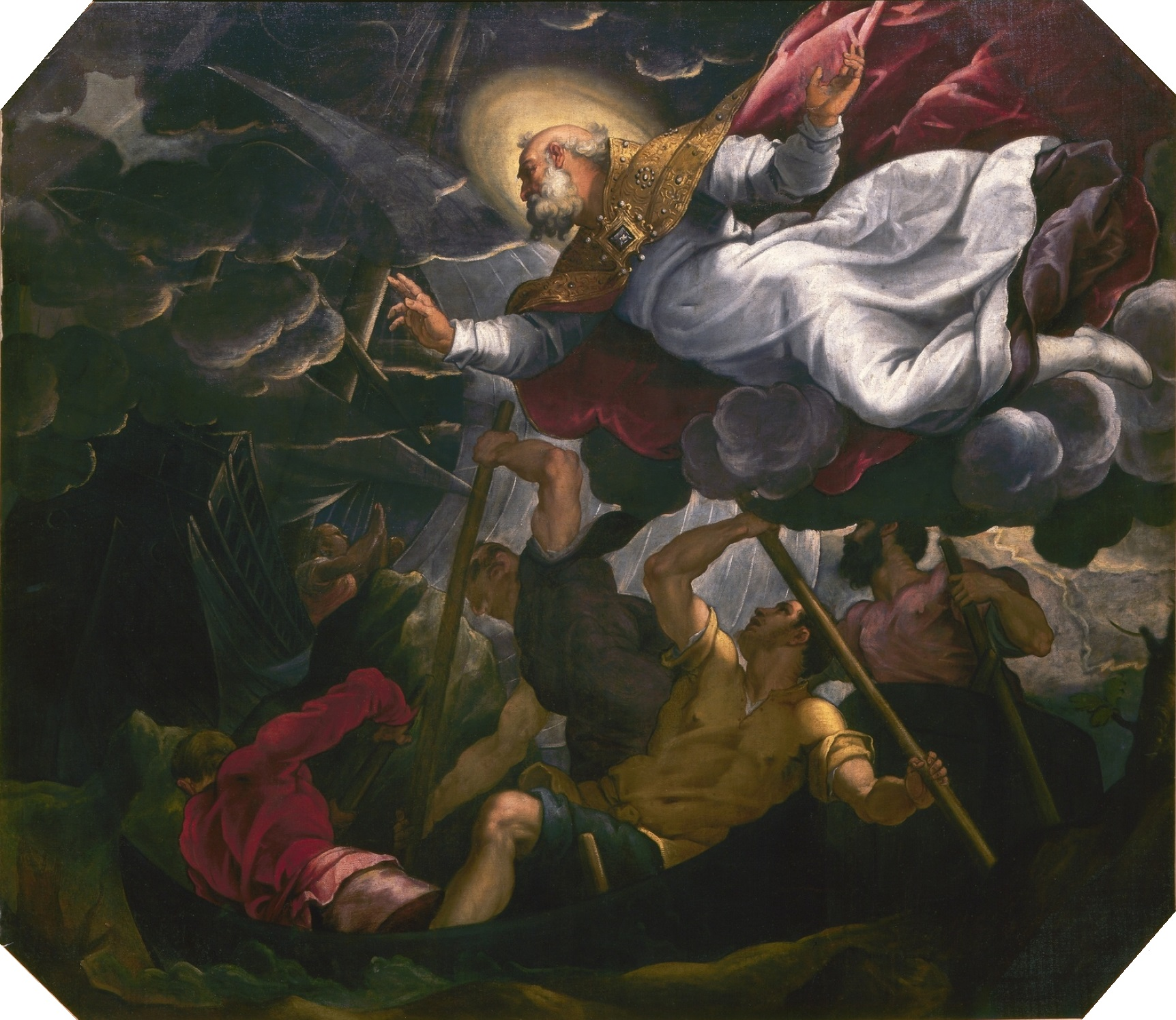
- St. Nicholas helping sailors in a storm, San Nicolò dei Mendicoli, Venice
- Born: 1561; Murano, Republic of Venice
- Died: 1605 (aged 43–44); Venice, Republic of Venice
- Known for: Painting
- Movement: Renaissance

Leonardo Corona (1561 – 1605) was an Italian painter of the Renaissance period, active mainly in Venice.

== Biography ==
Leonardo Corona was born in Murano in 1561. He is said to have been a pupil of the elder Titian, and completed some of his canvases after the master's death. Between 1577 and 1585 he frescoed the Hall of the Great Council of Venice in the Doge's Palace. Corona’s oil paintings depicting Christ’s Entry into Jerusalem and Christ before Caiaphas, executed before 1585 for San Giuliano, Venice, clearly show the influence of Tintoretto in the crowds of figures and the dramatic use of chiaroscuro.

His period of greatest activity was in the 1590s, when he worked in San Giovanni Elemosinario, Venice; his paintings there include a Crucifixion, the Prayer in the Garden and the Resurrection. In addition he painted a Crucifixion (Murano, Museo Vetrario) for Santa Maria Formosa, Venice, and another Crucifixion for San Fantin, Venice. He also painted an altarpiece, St. Onofrio and St. James (Castelfranco Veneto, Cathedral) for the Scuola dei Tintori (the dyers’ guild).

His continuing interest in chiaroscuro and the effects of light, seen in these works, reached its culmination in the canvases for San Giovanni in Bragora, Venice, depicting the Flagellation and the Crowning with Thorns, and in his cycle for the Scuola di San Fantin (1600–05; Venice, Ateneo Veneto), depicting eight scenes from the Passion and two Prophets, in which the dramatic composition and the intense chiaroscuro that causes the strongly Mannerist figures to stand out against their gloomy background anticipate works of the mid-17th century. Corona died in Venice in 1605. His pupils included Sante Peranda and Baldasarre Anna.

== Gallery ==
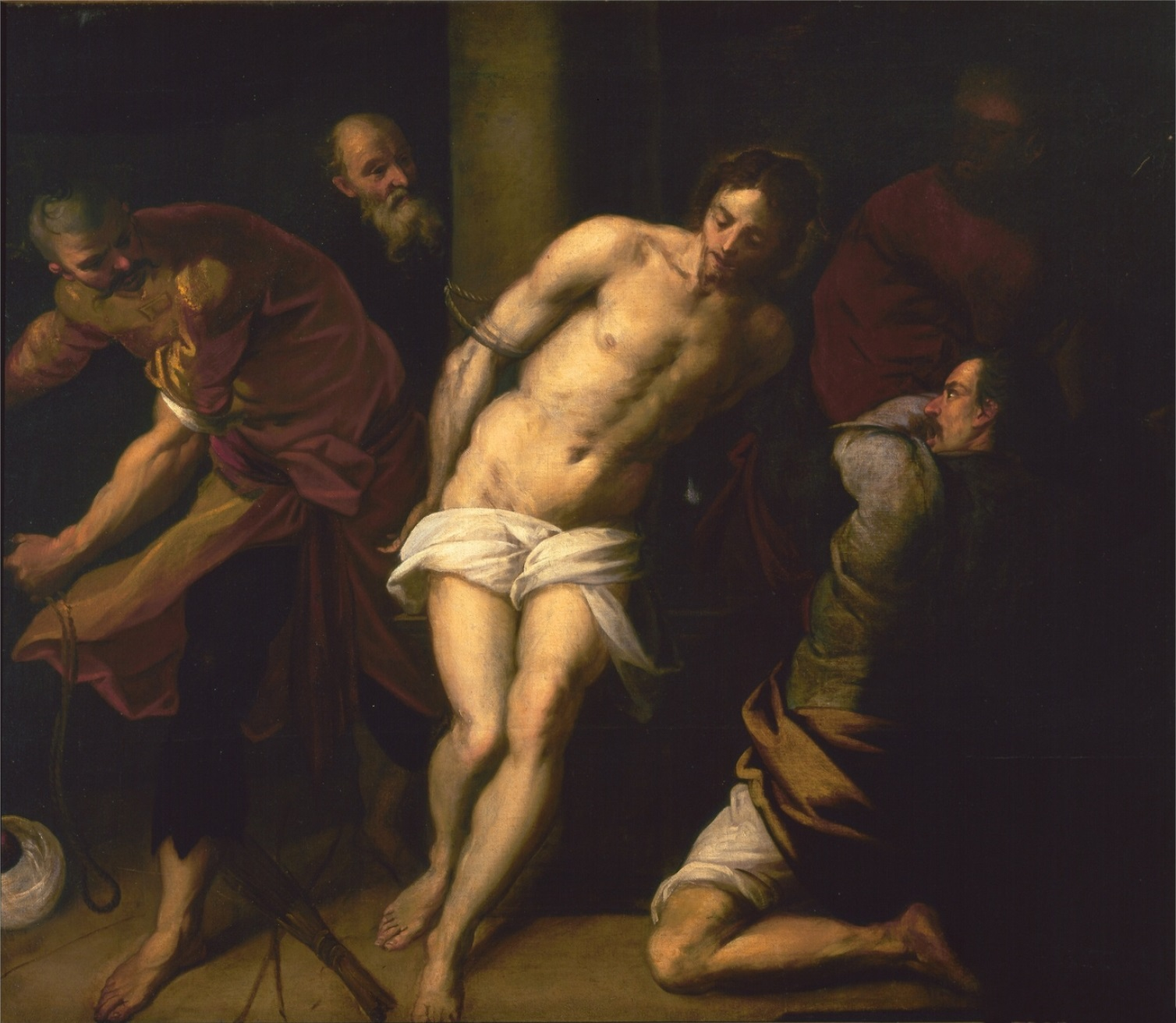
The Flagellation of Christ, c. 1595

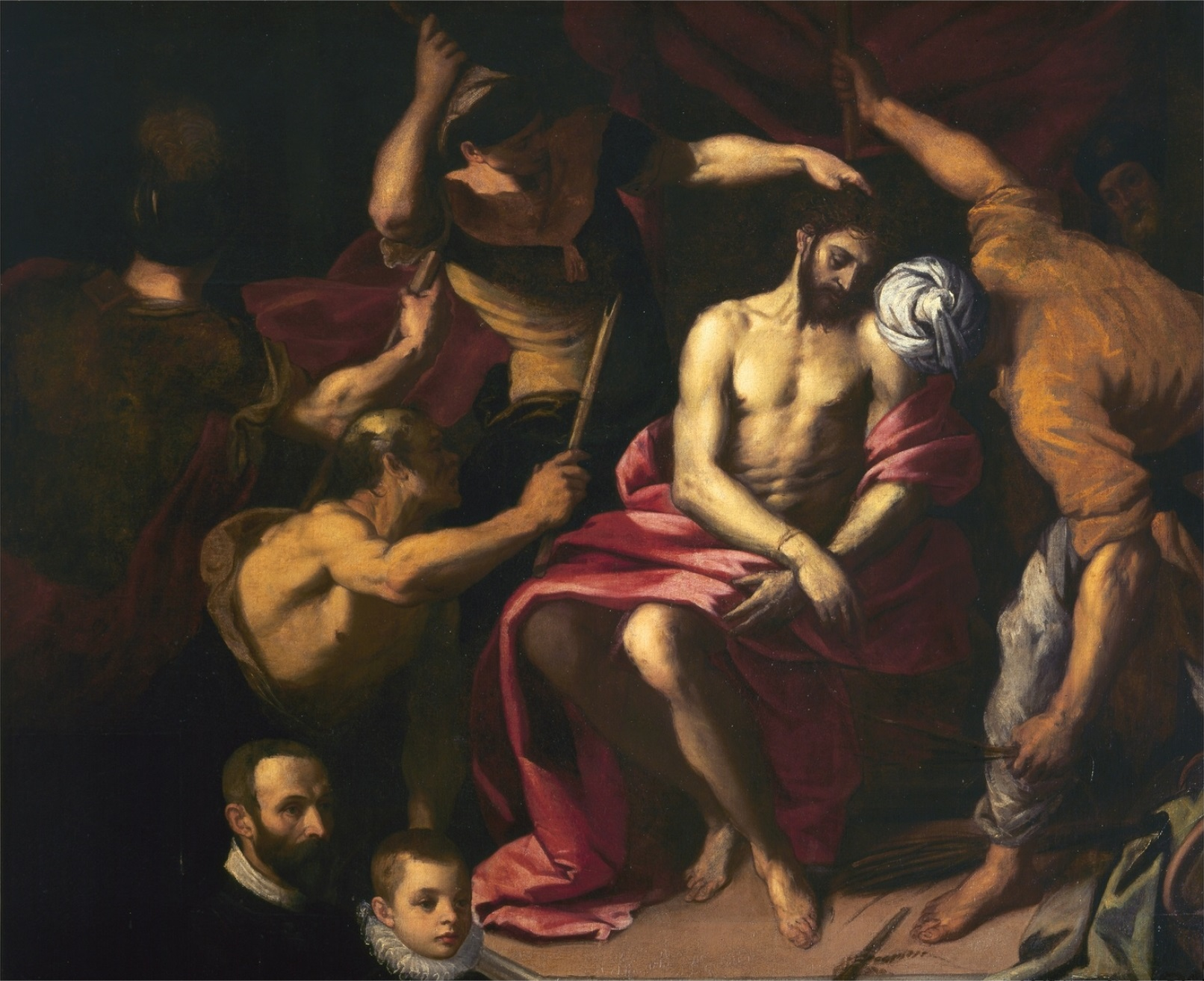
The Crowning with Thorns, c. 1595

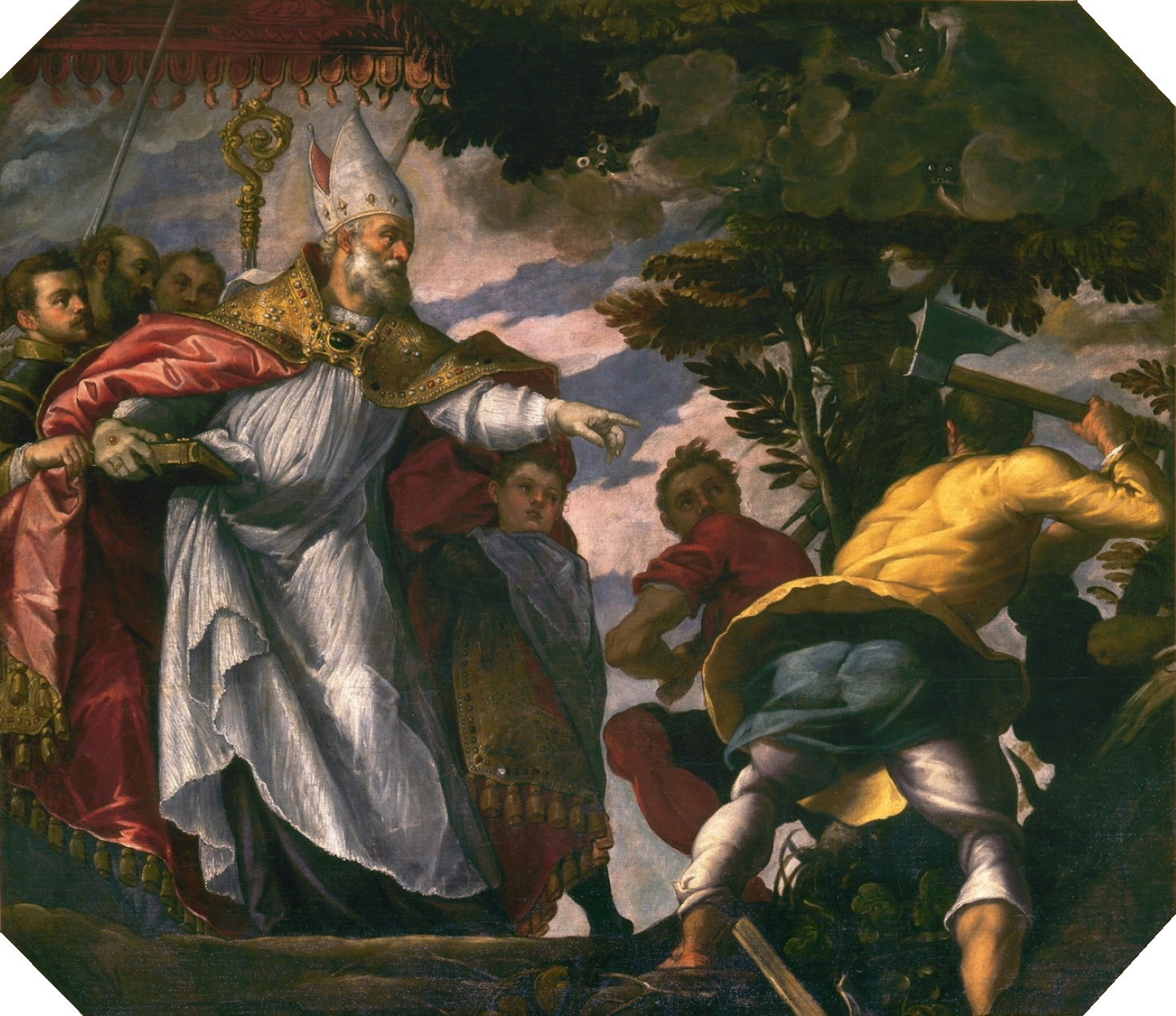
St. Nicholas cutting down a tree worshiped by heathens, c. 1595
