= San Fantin, Venice =

Church in Venice, Italy

San Fantin
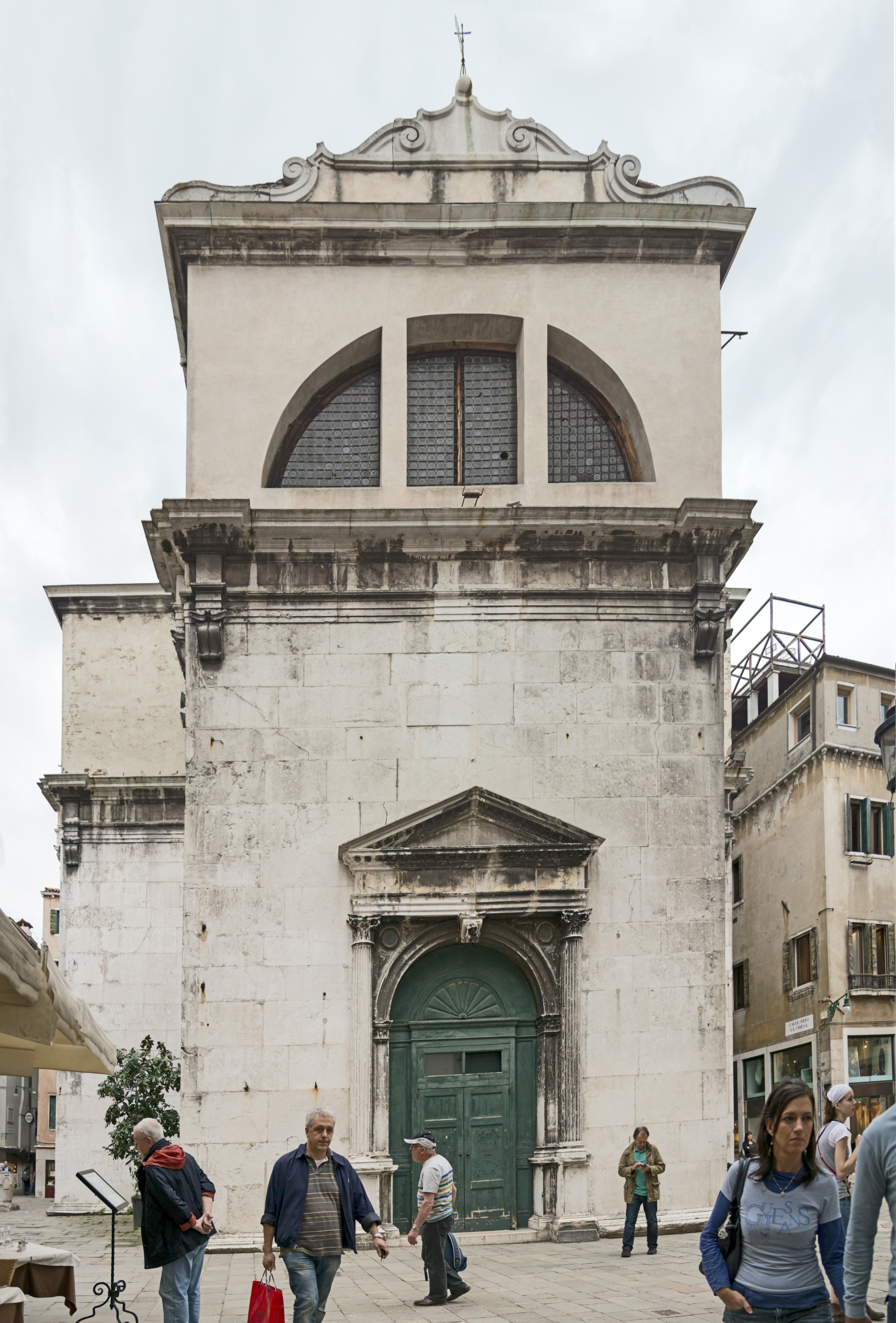

- Location within Venice Location within Italy

Religion
- Affiliation: Roman Catholic
- Province: Venice

Location
- Location: Venice, Italy
- Interactive map of San Fantin
- Coordinates: 45°26′02″N 12°20′03″E

Architecture
- Completed: 10th century

San Fantin (short for San Fantino) is a church in the sestiere of San Marco in Venice, Italy. It stands in front of the Fenice Theater and adjacent to the Ateneo Veneto (the former Scuola grande di San Fantin).

This parish church was first erected in the 10th century under the patronage of the patrician families from Barozzi, Aldicina, and Equilia. Reconstruction was undertaken by the Pisani family, who installed in the church a miraculous icon of the Virgin they had obtained from the East. The church of San Fantin by the 15th century came to be called the church of Santa Maria delle Grazie di San Fantino. Ten thousand ducats were willed for the church's reconstruction by Cardinal Giovanni Battista Zeno who died in 1501. A number of relics were transferred to this church including the body of Saint Marcellina and an Arm bone of the martyred Saint Trifone, Protector of Cattaro.

Work on the church has been assigned or attributed to many architects, from Pietro Lombardo, Sebastiano Mariani, and later Jacopo Sansovino. Over the door of the sacristy is conserved the funeral urn of Vinciguerra Dandolo, a work by Tullio Lombardo. In 1908, the church was documented to hold two Piazzetta paintings: Liberation of Venice from the Plague and a Pieta. It had a Holy Family attributed to Giovanni Bellini, a Crucifixion by Lionardo Corona, and a Visitation of Mary to Elizabeth by Tintoretto. These works have been relocated elsewhere.

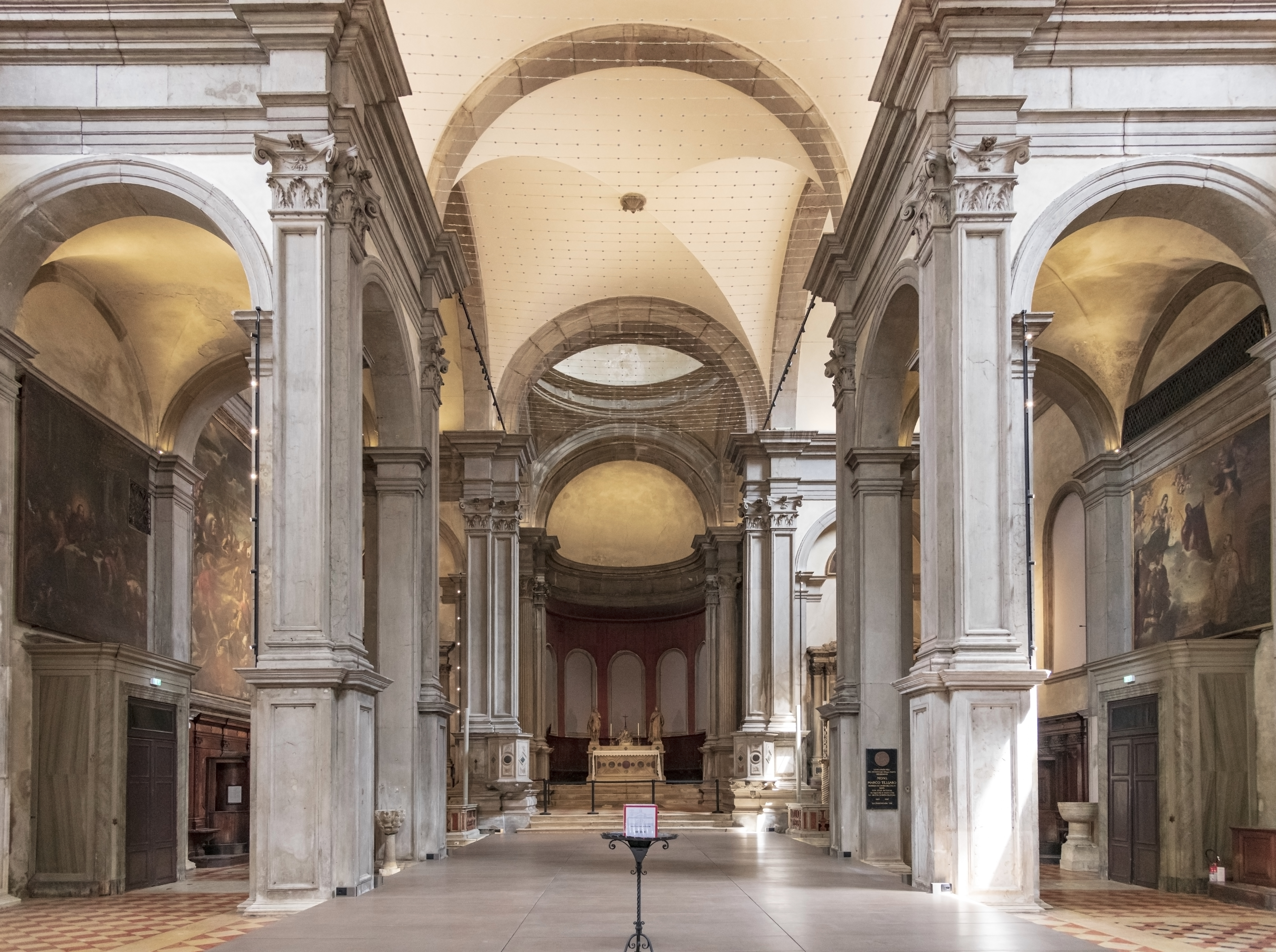
Interior view

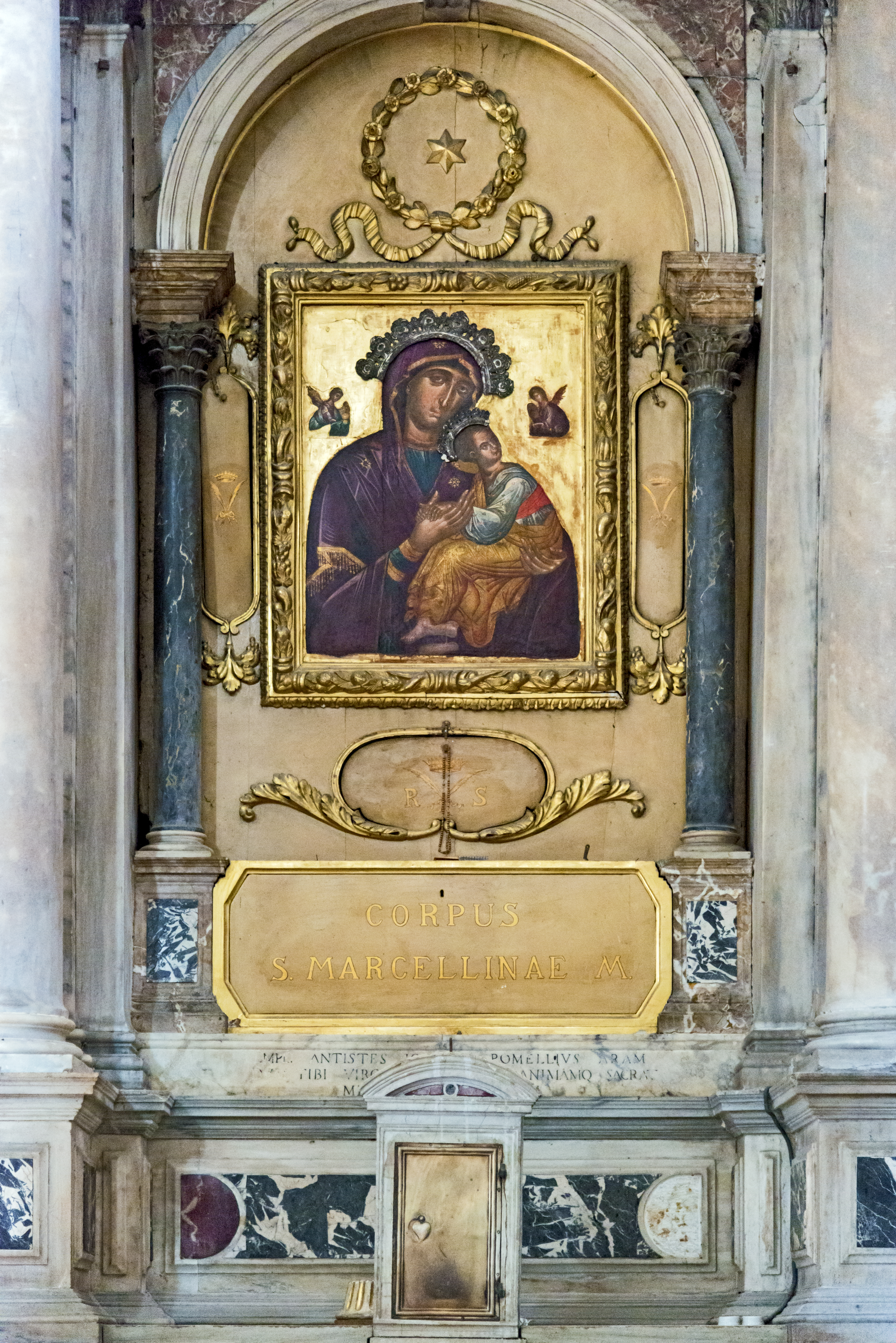
Miraculous icon of the Virgin

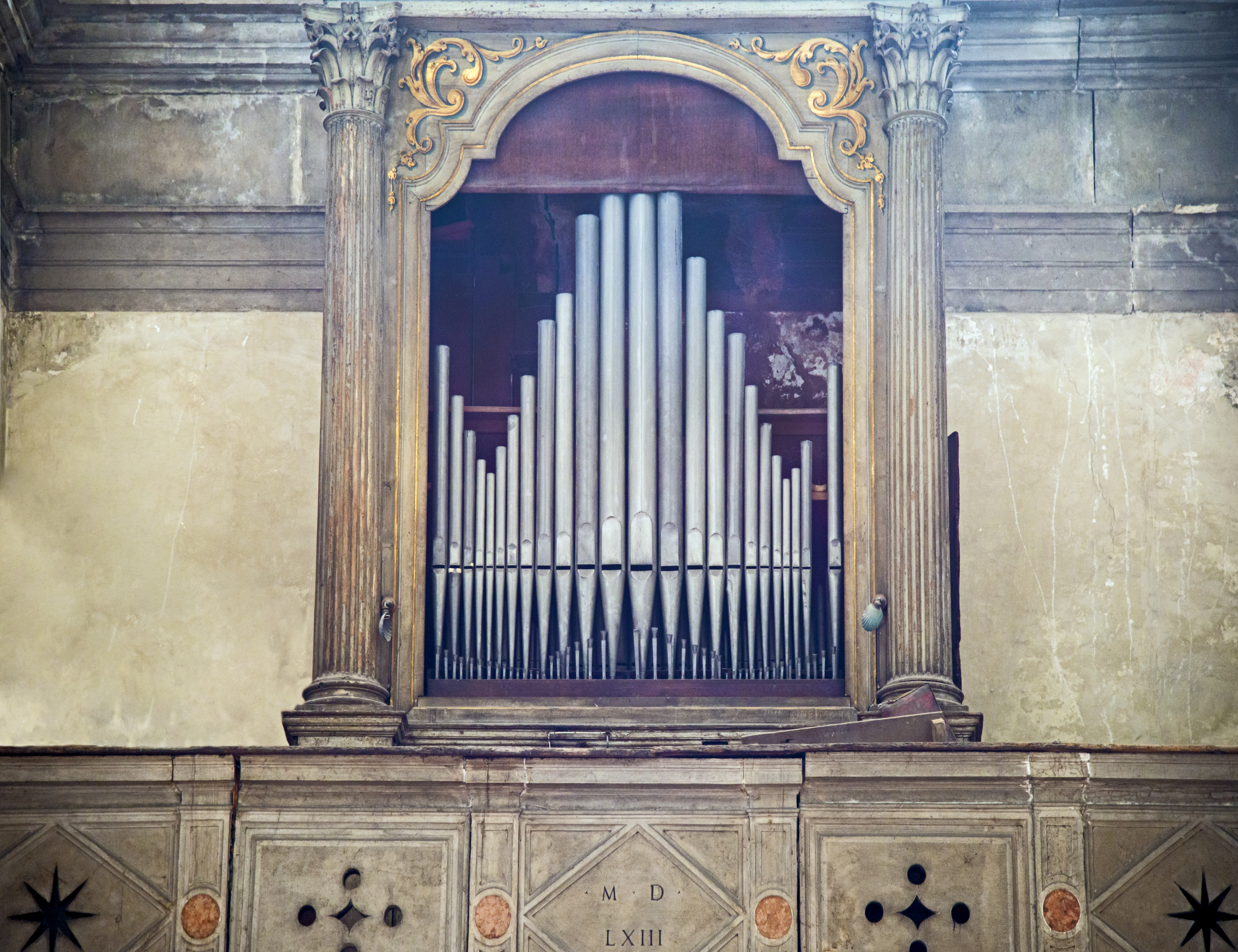
The organ above the porch

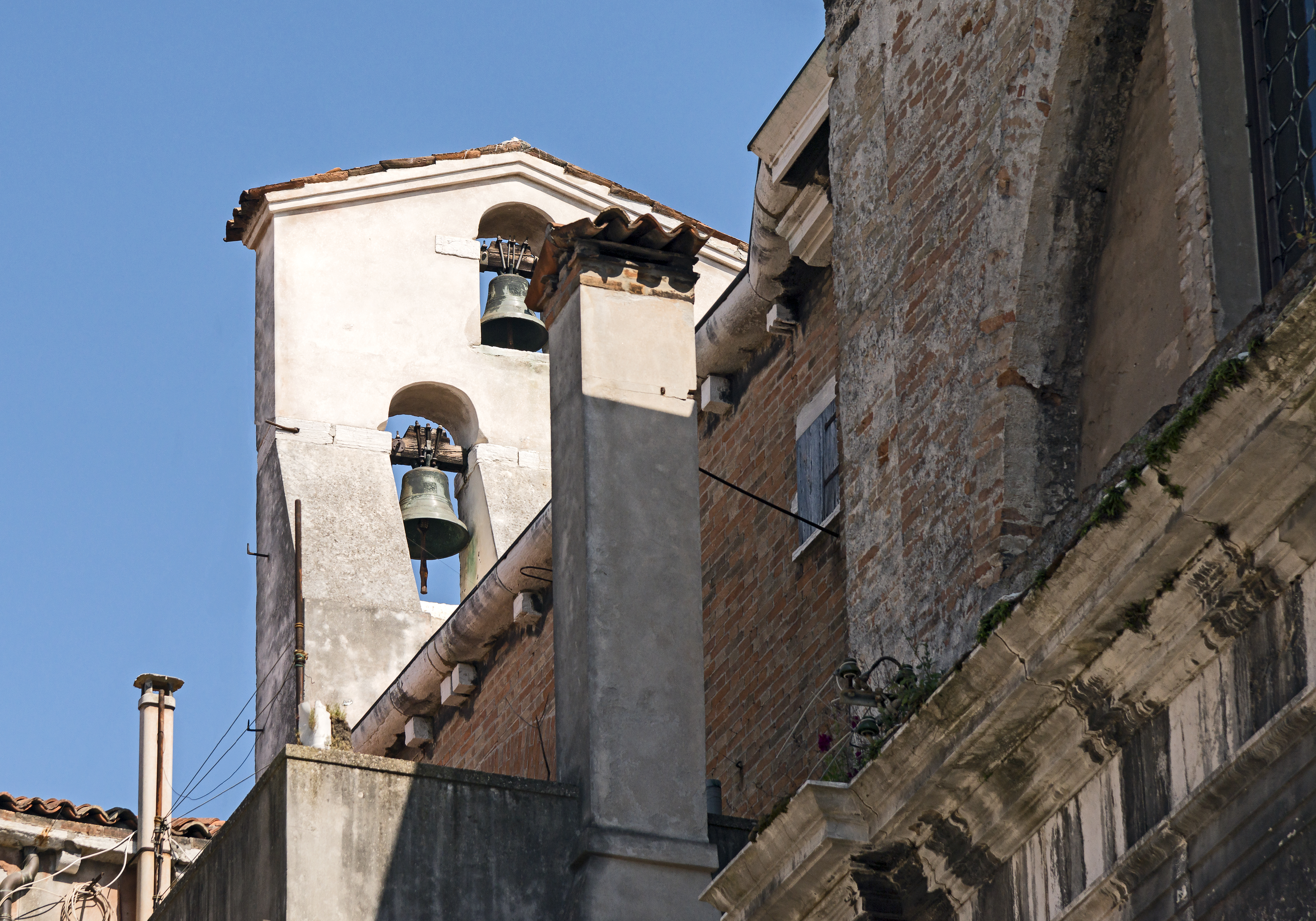
Bell gable

== See also ==
- 16th-century Western domes
