= Baldassare d'Anna =

Italian painter (c.1560–c.1639)

Baldassare or Baldasarre d'Anna (c. 1560 – after 1639) was an Italian painter, active in a Mannerist or late-Renaissance style.

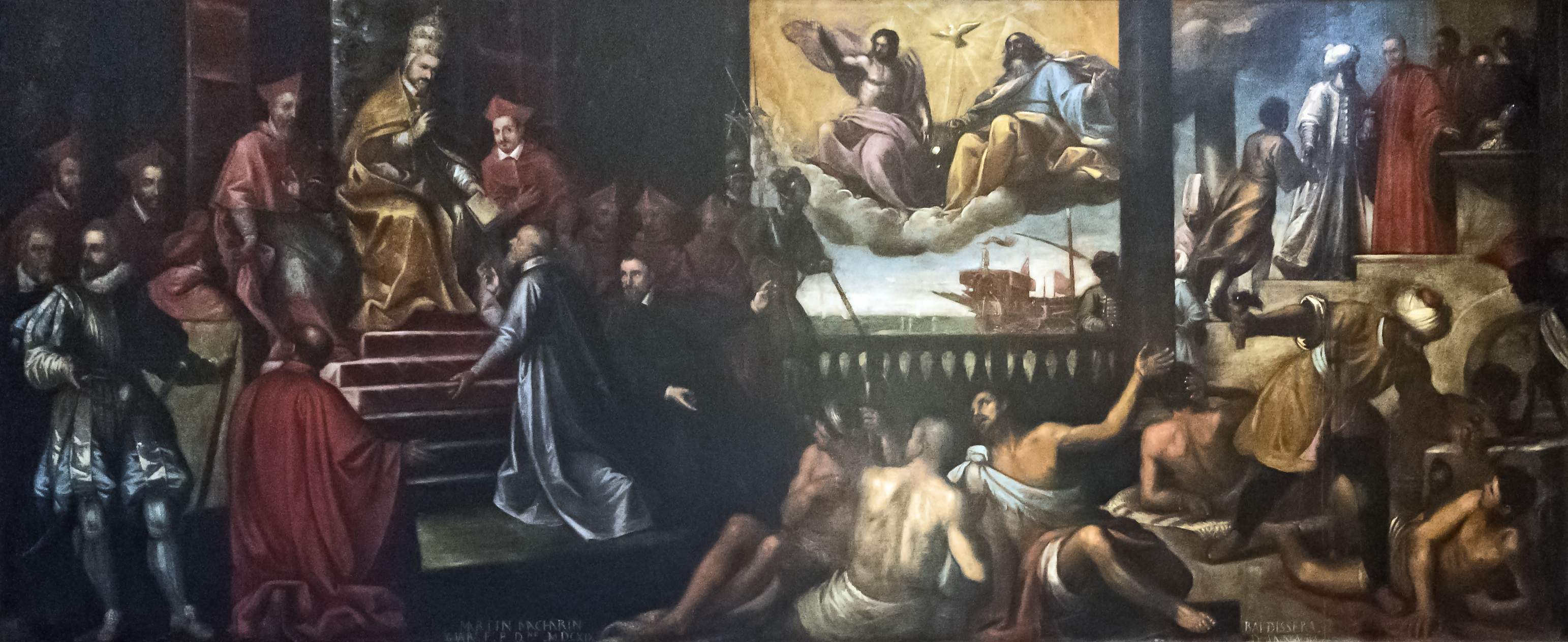
Approval of the Order of the Most Holy Trinity involved in the redemption of slaves Displayed in church of Santa Maria Formosa

== Biography ==
Born in Venice to a Flemish family, and trained with Leonardo Corona. The date of his death is uncertain, but he seems to have been alive in 1639. For a number of years he studied under Corona, and on the death of that painter completed several works left unfinished by him. His own activity seems to have been confined to the production of pieces for several of the churches and a few private houses in Venice, and the old guide-books and descriptions of the city notice a considerable number of paintings by him. Scarcely any have survived.

For the Sanctuary of the Madonna delle Grazie in Cordovado, he painted or frescoed a number of works depicting events in the life of the Virgin, including: (for the cupola of the church) Visitation of Mary to St Anne and Joachim; Circumcision of Jesus; Adoration of the Magi; Presentation of Jesus at the Temple and Purification of Mary; Massacre of the Innocents; Jesus among the Doctors; Assumption of the Virgin; Coronation of the Virgin; and (two lunettes) a Birth of the Virgin and Assumption of the Virgin.
