= Santa Maria Formosa =

Church in Venice, Italy

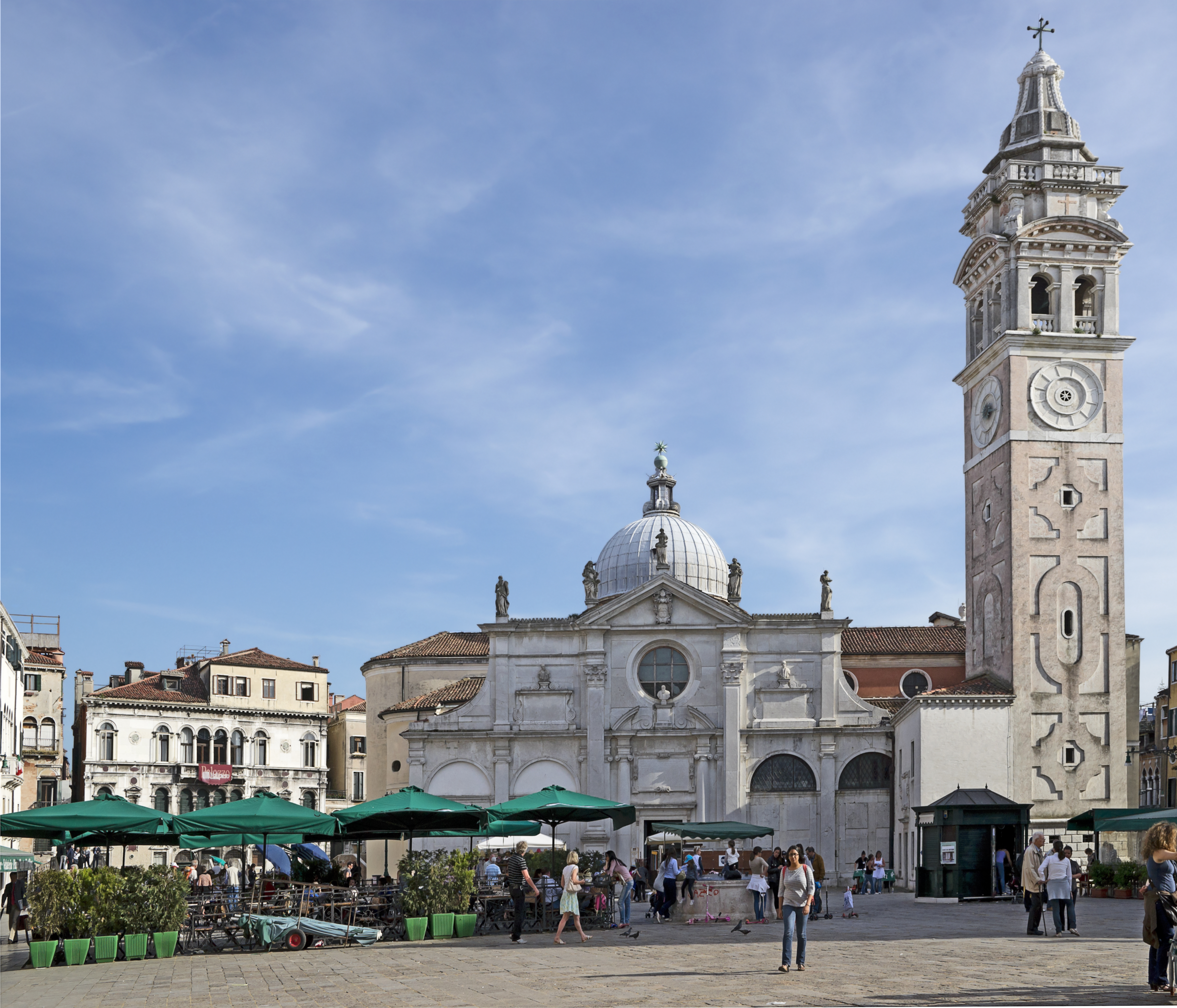
- Santa Maria Formosa: north facade

- Location within Venice Location within Italy

Religion
- Affiliation: Roman Catholic
- Province: Venice

Location
- Location: Venice, Italy
- Coordinates: 45.4369°N 12.3411°E

Architecture
- Completed: 1492

Santa Maria Formosa, formally The Church of the Purification of Mary, is a church in Venice, northern Italy. It was erected in 1492 under the design by Renaissance architect Mauro Codussi. It lies on the site of a previous church dating from the 7th century, which, according to tradition, was one of the eight founded by San Magno, bishop of Oderzo. The name "formosa" relates to an alleged appearance of the Holy Virgin disguised as a voluptuous woman.

== Exterior ==
The plan is on the Latin cross, with a nave and two aisles. The two façades were commissioned in 1542, the Renaissance-style one facing the canal, and 1604, the Baroque one facing the nearby square. The dome of the church was rebuilt after falling in during an earthquake in 1688.

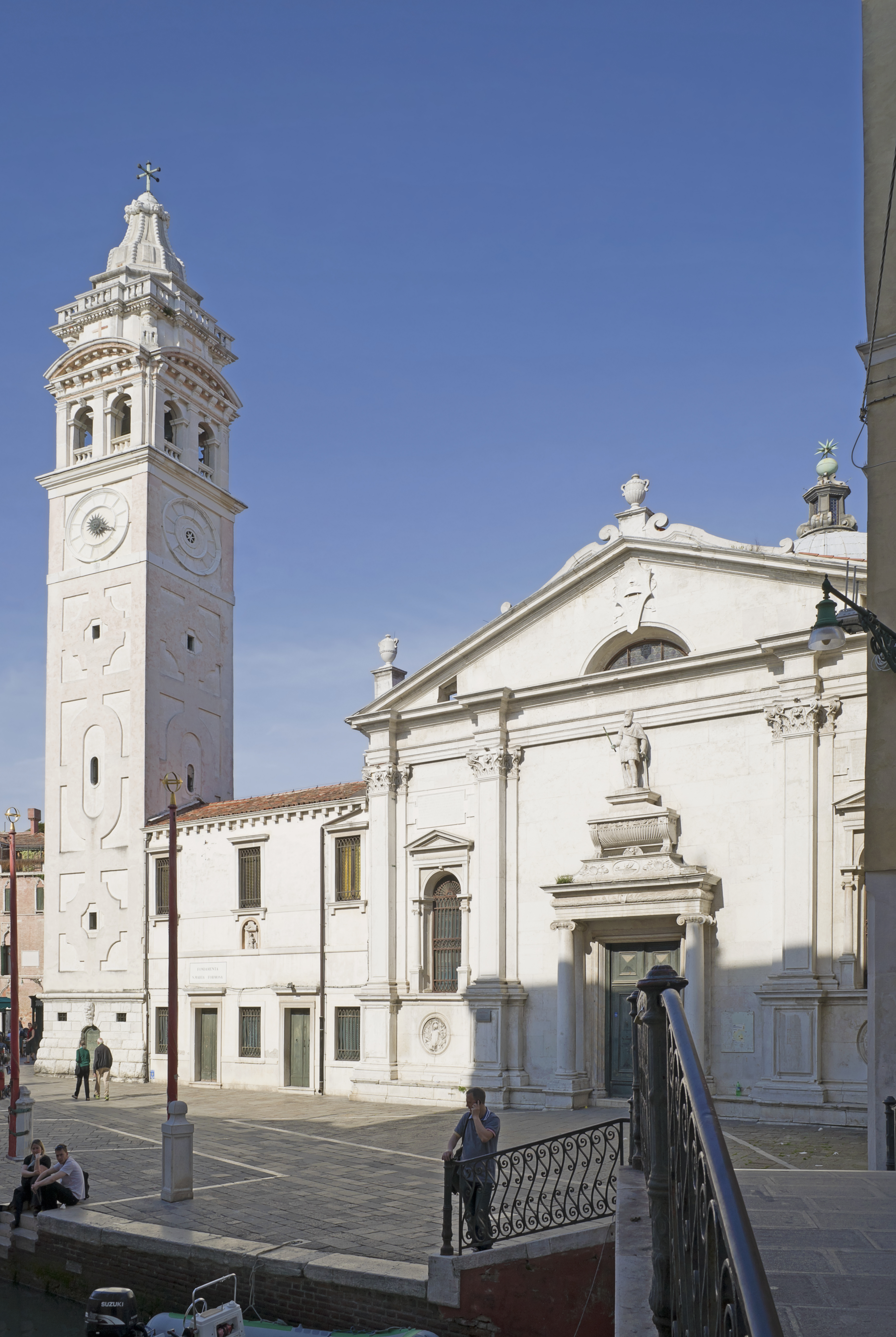
West facade

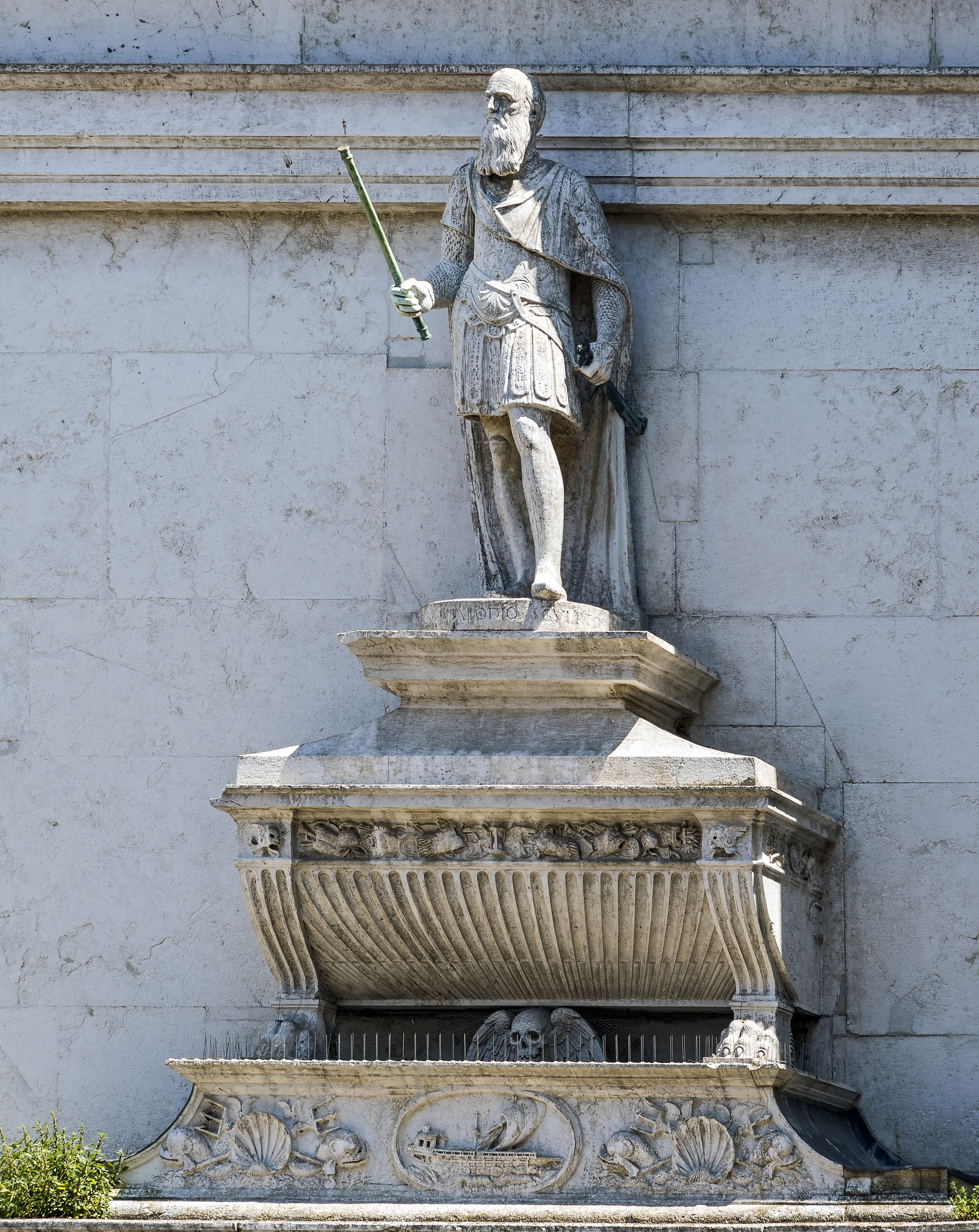
Monument to Vincenzo Cappello

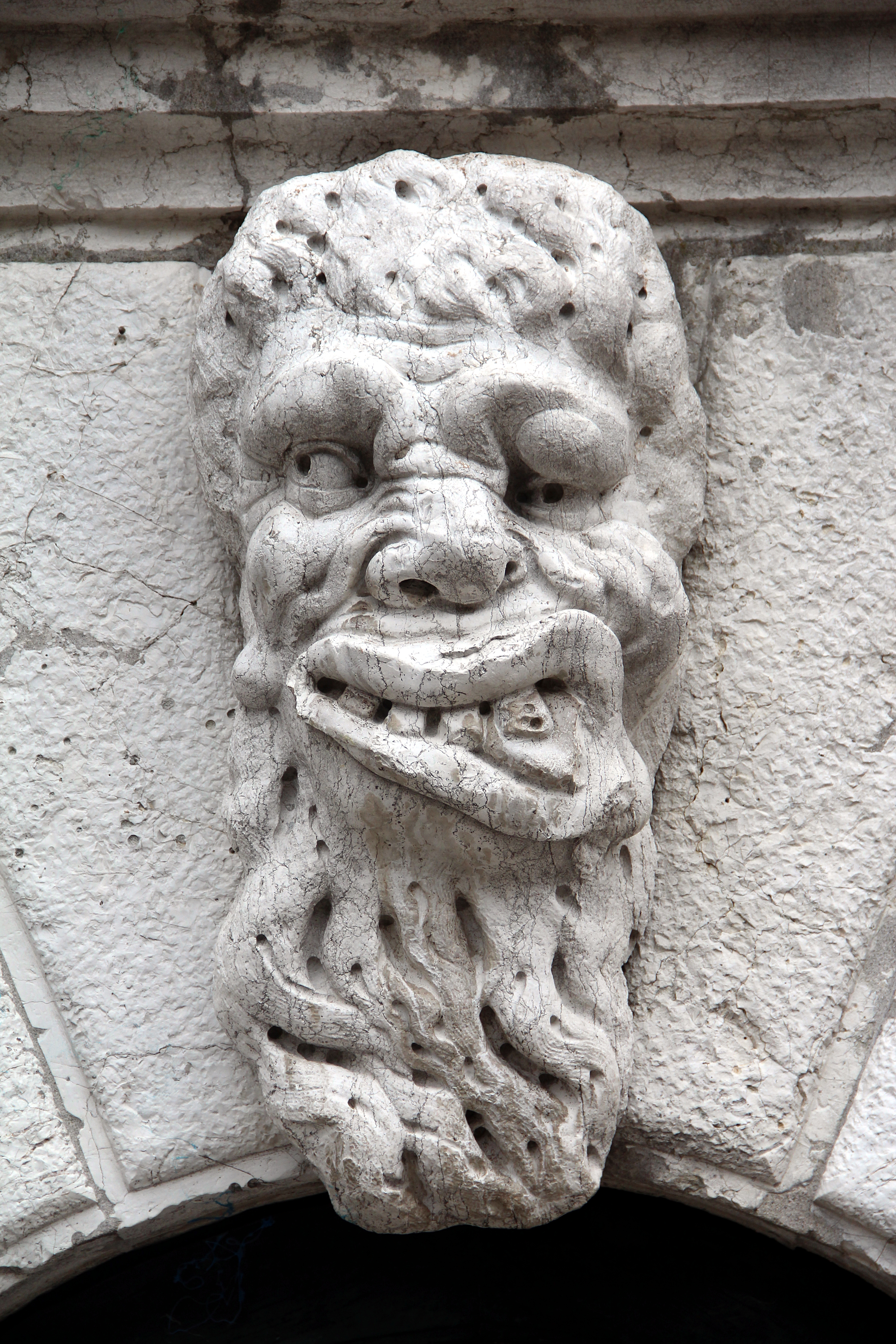
Mascaron adorning the front door of the campanile.

== Interior ==
The artworks in the interior include the Saint Barbara polyptych by Palma Vecchio, one of his most celebrated works. The Conception Chapel houses a triptych of Madonna of Misericordia by Bartolomeo Vivarini (1473), while in the Oratory is the Madonna with Child and St. Dominic by Giambattista Tiepolo (18th century). There is also a Last Supper by Leandro Bassano.

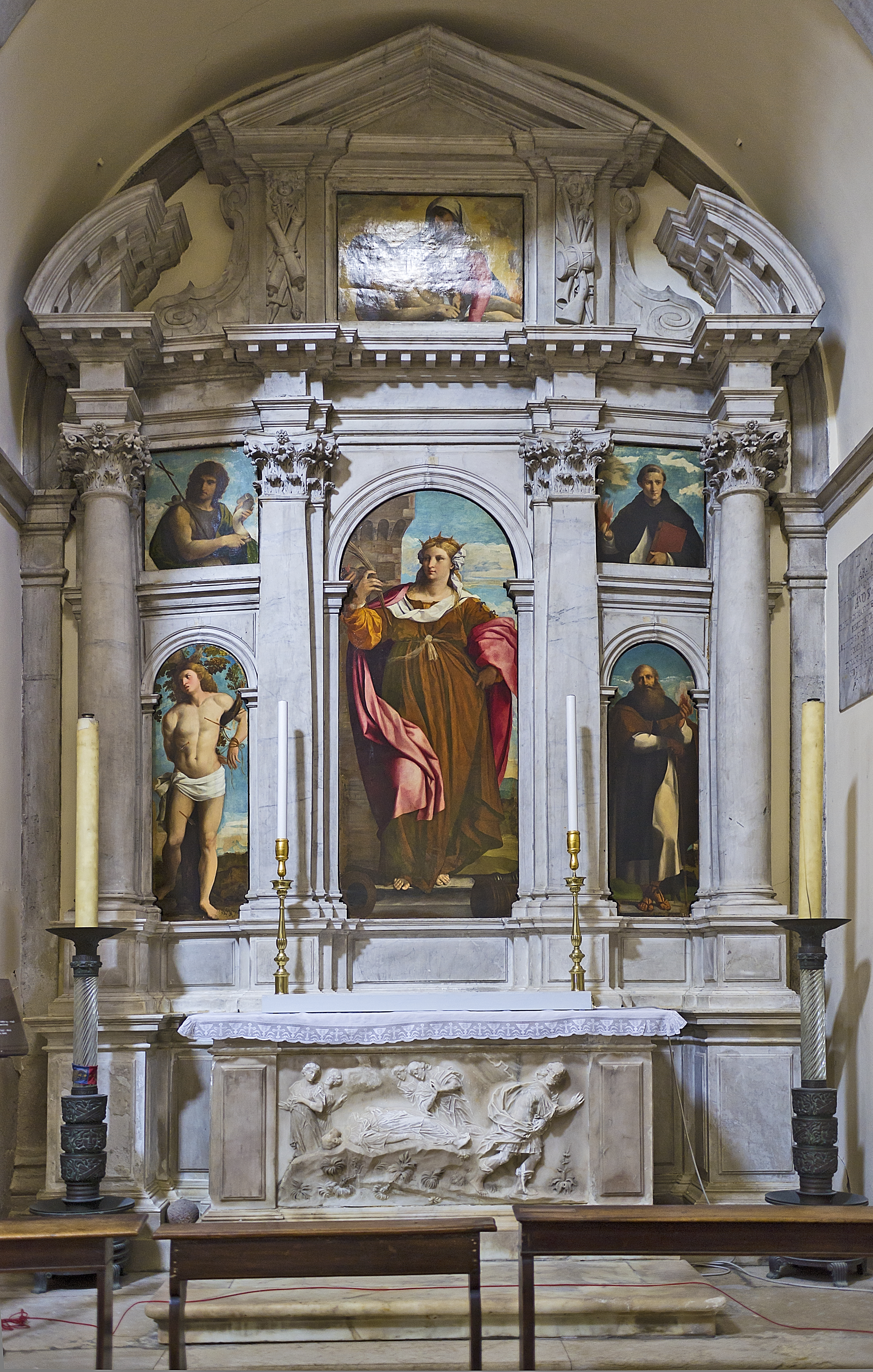
Polyptych of Saint Barbara by Palma the Elder

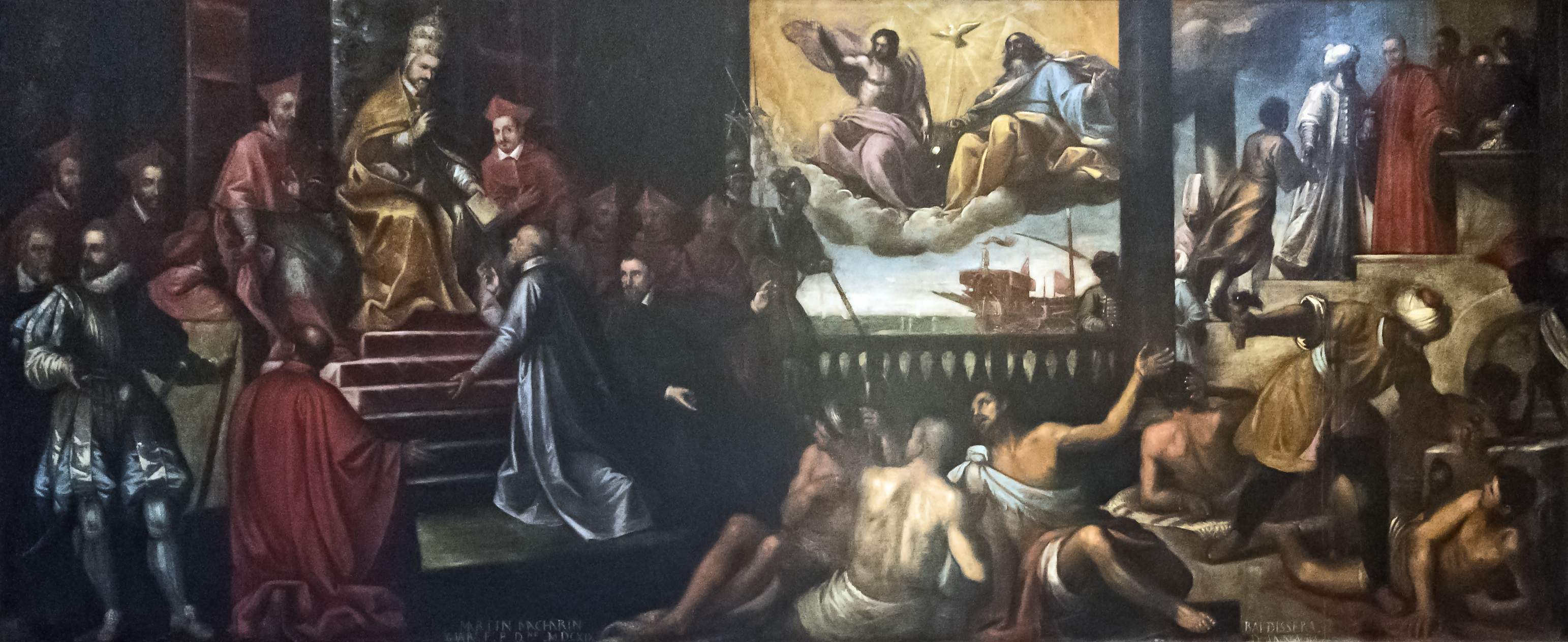
Approval of the Order of the Most Holy Trinity by Baldassare d'Anna

== See also ==
- Palazzo Grimani di Santa Maria Formosa
- Palazzo Zorzi Galeoni nearby palace by Mauro Codussi
- Palazzo Malipiero-Trevisan
- Late medieval domes
- Italian Renaissance domes

== Sources ==
- Chorusvenezia
