= Giorgio (name) =

- Pronunciation: Italian: [ˈdʒordʒo]
- Gender: Male
- Language: Italian

Origin
- Meaning: "Farmer"

Other names
- See also: George, Georg, Georginio, Jürgen, Yuri, Georgy, Georges, Jorge

Giorgio is a male Italian given name derived from the Greek Georgios and sometimes a surname. It is equivalent to the English name George. Notable people with the name include:

== Given name ==
- Giorgio Ordelaffi, Italian nobility
- Giorgio de' Buondelmonti, ruler of Ioannina in 1411

=== Artists and entertainers ===
- Giorgio Amendola, Italian writer
- Giorgio Andreoli, Italian potter
- Giorgio Anselmi, Italian painter
- Giorgio Arlorio, Italian screenwriter and director
- Giorgio Baffo, Italian poet
- Giorgio Bàrberi Squarotti, Italian literary critic
- Giorgio Bassani, Italian writer
- Giorgio Bianchi, Italian film director
- Giorgio Calabrese, Italian songwriter
- Giorgio Cantarini, Italian actor
- Giorgio Capitani, Italian film director
- Giorgio Cavaglieri, Italian-American painter
- Giorgio Cavazzano, Italian comic strip artist
- Giorgio de Chirico, Italian painter
- Giorgio Colangeli, Italian actor
- Giorgio De Simone, Italian journalist and writer
- Giorgio Duranti, Italian painter
- Giorgio Faletti, Italian writer
- Giorgio Ferrich, Croatian writer
- Giorgio Ferroni, Italian director
- Giorgio Gaber, Italian singer-songwriter
- Giorgio Gandini del Grano, Italian painter
- Carlo Giorgio Garofalo, Italian composer
- Giorgio Gaslini, Italian jazz pianist
- Giorgio Federico Ghedini, Italian composer
- Giorgio Ghisi, Italian engraver
- Giorgio Gomelsky, Georgian record producer
- Giorgio Grassi, Italian architect
- Giorgio Lamberti (tenor), Italian tenor
- Giorgio Locatelli, Italian television chef
- Giorgio Mainerio, Italian composer
- Giorgio Manganelli, Italian writer
- Giorgio Massari, Italian architect
- Giorgio Morandi, Italian painter
- Giorgio Moroder, Italian record producer
- Giorgio Moser, Italian film director and screenwriter
- Giorgio Orsini, Croatian sculptor
- George Ortuzar, Cuban-American television personality (nicknamed "Giorgio" on his show Giorgiomania)
- Giorgio Pacchioni, Italian performer
- Giorgio Pasotti, Italian actor and martial arts athlete
- Giorgio Pastina, Italian screenwriter and film director
- Giorgio Pressburger, Italian writer
- Giorgio Prosperi, Italian screenwriter
- Giorgio Pullicino, Maltese painter and architect
- Giorgio Ronconi, Italian baritone
- Giorgio Sadotti, British conceptual artist
- Giorgio Saviane, Italian writer
- Giorgio Scerbanenco, Italian crime writer
- Giorgio Costantino Schinas, Maltese architect and civil engineer
- Giorgio Sommer, German-Italian photographer
- Giorgio Strehler, Italian opera director
- Giorgio Tirabassi, Italian actor
- Giorgio Tozzi, American opera singer
- Giorgio A. Tsoukalos, Swiss-born Greek writer
- Giorgio Tuinfort, Suriname-born Dutch music composer and producer
- Giorgio van Straten, Italian writer
- Giorgio Vasari, Italian painter and architect
- Giorgio Zancanaro, Italian baritone
- Pier Giorgio Di Cicco, Italian-Canadian poet

=== Politicians ===
- Giorgio Adorno, doge of the Republic of Genoa
- Giorgio Almirante, Italian politician
- Giorgio Borġ Olivier, Maltese politician
- Giorgio Carbone, Italian "head of state" of Seborga
- Giorgio Carollo, Italian politician
- Giorgio de' Buondelmonti, ruler of Epirus
- Giorgio Giudici, Swiss politician
- Giorgio La Malfa, Italian politician
- Giorgio La Pira, Italian politician
- Giorgio Mammoliti, Canadian city councillor
- Giorgio Mitrovich, Maltese politician and activist
- Giorgio Napolitano, Italian president
- Giorgio Orsoni, Italian politician
- Giorgio Ruffolo, Italian economist, journalist and politician
- Giorgio Sonnino, Italian politician
- Giorgio Tonini (born 1959), Italian journalist and politician
- Giorgio Vido, Italian politician

=== Scientists and philosophers ===
- Giorgio Abetti, Italian solar astronomer
- Giorgio Agamben, Italian philosopher
- Giorgio Antonucci, Italian physician
- Giorgio Baglivi, Croatian scientist
- Giorgio Banti, Italian linguist
- Giorgio Biandrata, Italian physician
- Giorgio Buttazzo, Italian engineer
- Giorgio Ceragioli, Italian engineer and peace activist
- Giorgio Colli, Italian philosophy professor
- Giorgio Del Vecchio, Italian legal philosopher
- Giorgio Jan, Italian zoologist
- Giorgio Levi Della Vida, Italian Jewish linguist
- Giorgio Malinverni, Swiss law professor
- Giorgio Nataletti, Italian musicologist
- Giorgio Parisi, Italian theoretical physicist
- Giorgio Pestelli, Italian musicologist
- Giorgio Samorini, Italian ethnobotanist
- Giorgio Sideri, Italian cartographer
- Gian Giorgio Trissino, Italian humanist

=== Sportsmen ===
- Giorgio Achterberg, Dutch football player
- Giorgio Alverà, Italian bobsleigher
- Giorgio Anglesio, Italian fencer
- Giorgio Avola, Italian fencer
- Giorgio Bassi, Italian race car driver
- Giorgio Belladonna, Italian bridge player
- Giorgio Biasini, Italian bobsledder
- Giorgio Bocchino, Italian fencer
- Giorgio Cagnotto, Italian diver
- Giorgio Cecchinel, Italian cyclist
- Giorgio Chiellini, Italian football player
- Giorgio Chinaglia, Italian football striker
- Giorgio Cornacchia, Italian rugby league footballer
- Giorgio Corona, Italian football player
- Giorgio de Bettin, Italian ice hockey player
- Giorgio Di Centa, Italian cross country skier
- Giorgio Duboin, Italian bridge player
- Giorgio Ferrini, Italian football player
- Giorgio Francia, Italian racing driver
- Giorgio Frezzolini, Italian football player
- Giorgio Frinolli, Italian hurdler
- Giorgio Furlan, Italian cyclist
- Giorgio Galimberti, Italian tennis player
- Giorgio Ghezzi, Italian football player
- Giorgio Gorla, Italian sailor
- Giorgio Lalle, Italian breaststroke swimmer
- Giorgio Lamberti, Italian swimmer
- Giorgio Lucenti, Italian football player
- Giorgio Marras, Italian sprinter
- Giorgio Mazza, Italian hurdler
- Giorgio Mellacina, Swiss football goalkeeper
- Giorgio Mondini, Swiss racing driver
- Giorgio Morini, Italian football player
- Giorgio Oberweger, Italian athlete
- Giorgio Pantano, Italian racing driver
- Giorgio Perondini, Italian swimmer
- Giorgio Pessina, Italian fencer
- Giorgio Petrosyan, Italian kickboxer
- Giorgio Piantanida, Italian alpine skier
- Giorgio Piantella, Italian pole vaulter
- Giorgio Pichler, Italian luger
- Giorgio Puia, Italian football player
- Giorgio Rasulo, English football player
- Giorgio Rocca, Italian alpine skier
- Giorgio Roselli, Italian football player and coach
- Giorgio Rossano, Italian football player
- Giorgio Rubino, Italian race walker
- Giorgio Santelli, Italian fencer
- Giorgio Sbruzzi, Italian canoeist
- Giorgio Scarlatti, Italian racing driver
- Giorgio Schiavini, Italian football player
- Giorgio Sterchele, Italian football player
- Giorgio Tavecchio, Italian-born gridiron football player
- Giorgio Treves de'Bonfili, Italian football player
- Giorgio Vanzetta, Italian cross-country skier
- Giorgio Venturin, Italian footballer
- Giorgio Visioli, English boxer
- Giorgio Zampori, Italian gymnast

=== Other professions ===
- Giorgio Armani, (1934–2025) Italian fashion designer
- Giorgio Basta, Italian general
- Giorgio DeLuca, American entrepreneur
- Giorgio Gusmini, Italian cardinal
- Giorgio Marengo (born 1974), Italian prelate of the Catholic Church
- Giorgio Panto, Italian entrepreneur
- Giorgio Perlasca, Italian war hero
- Pier Giorgio Frassati, Italian Roman Catholic social activist, beatified

== Surname ==
- Eusebio da San Giorgio, Italian painter
- Francesco di Giorgio, Italian painter
- Francesco Giorgio, Italian writer
- Frank Di Giorgio, Canadian city councillor
- Gail Brewer-Giorgio, American author
- Marosa di Giorgio, Uruguayan writer
- Pietro De Giorgio (born 1983), Italian footballer

== Fictional characters ==
- Giorgio Bruno, a character from the video game Time Crisis 4
- Giorgio Zott, the main antagonist from the video game Time Crisis 3

== See also ==
- Di Giorgio (disambiguation)
- San Giorgio (disambiguation)
