= Goga =

Goga may refer to:

== People ==
=== Surname ===
- Dorin Goga (born 1984), Romanian footballer
- Lefter Goga (1921–97), Albanian politician
- Ľudovít Goga (born 1969), Slovak politician
- Moukaila Goga (born 1987), Togolese footballer
- Octavian Goga (1881–1938), Romanian politician and writer
- Petro Goga (fl. 1924), Albanian politician

=== Given name ===
- Goga Ashkenazi (born Gaukhar Yerkinovna Berkalieva, 1980), Kazakh-Russian businesswoman and socialite
- Goga Bitadze (born 1999), Georgian basketball player
- Goga Kapoor (Ravinder Kapoor, 1940–2011), Indian film actor
- Goga Khachidze (Giorgi Khachidze, born 1974), Georgian politician
- Goga Pahalwan (before 1948 – 1981), Pakistani wrestler
- Goga Sekulić (born 1977), Serbian turbo-folk singer

== Places ==
- Ghogha, a village and seaport in Gujarat, historically referred as Gogo or Gogha
- Goga, a village in Râfov Commune, Prahova County, Romania
- Goga, Iran, a village in Gilan Province, Iran
- Üçbulaq, Fizuli, Azerbaijan, a village also known as Goga

== Other uses ==
- Gogaji, a folk deity of northwestern India also known as "Goga"
- Goga, fictional magician portrayed by Amitabh Bachchan in the 1989 Indian film Jaadugar
- Crime Master Gogo, fictional villain in the 1994 Indian film Andaaz Apna Apna
- Goga, a self-titled character portrayed by Goga Kapoor in the 1985 Indian film Mard

== See also ==
- Gogo (disambiguation)
- Gogi (disambiguation)
- Thanasis Gogas (born 1980), Greek footballer
