= Goggio =

Goggio (pronounced [ˈɡɔddʒo]) is an Italian medieval male given name, a variant of Giorgio (George), now surviving as a surname in Piedmont. Notable people with the name include:

- Bartolomeo Goggio (c. 1430–1490s), Italian writer and notary
- Biagio Goggio (1892–1915), Italian footballer

== See also ==
- Goggi
- Goggia
- Gosio
