= Treves (disambiguation) =

Treves (Trier) is a city in Germany on the banks of the Moselle.

Treves may also refer to:

- Giorgio Treves de'Bonfili (1884–1964), Italian footballer
- Treves (surname), a surname (and a list of people with the name)
- Treves Butte, prominent of Discovery Ridge in the Ohio Range

== See also ==
- Trèves
