= Hours of Gian Galeazzo Visconti =

14th-century illuminated manuscript

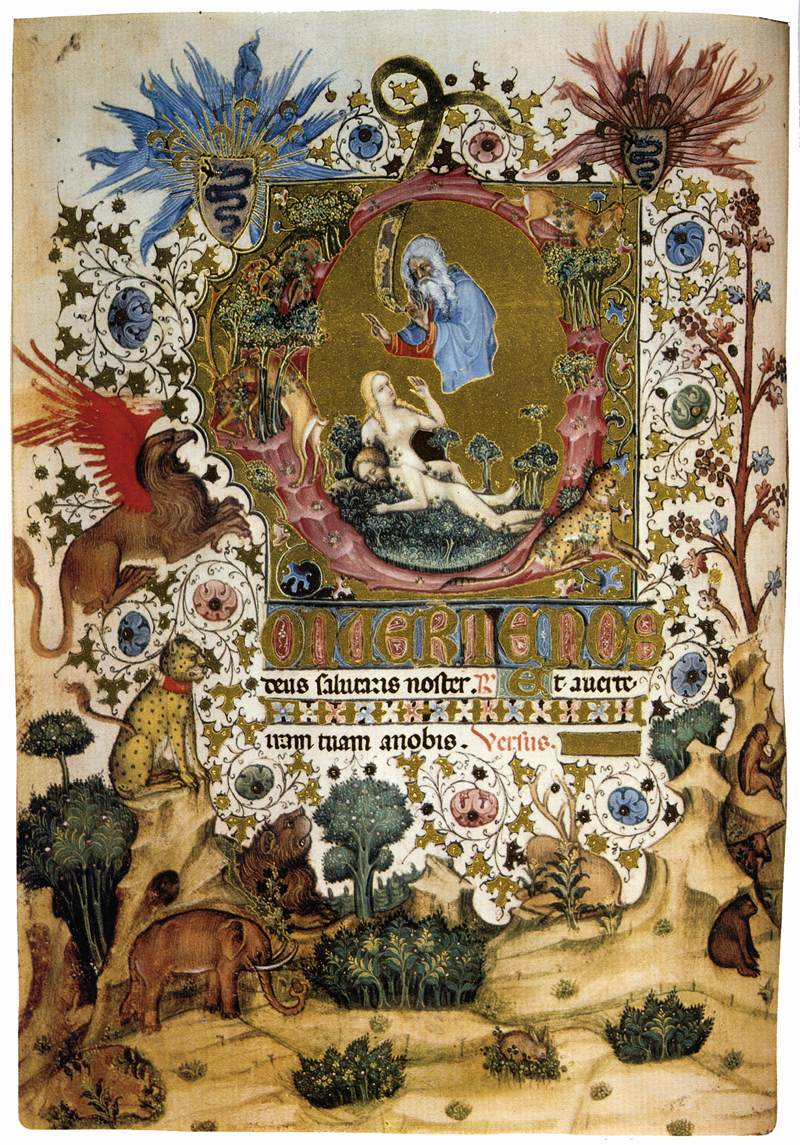
Visconti Hours LF46v, attributed to Belbello da Pavia

The Hours of Giangaleazzo Visconti (Florence, Biblioteca Nazionale, Banco Rari 397 and Landau-Finaly 22) is a Roman-liturgy, illuminated Book of Hours in Latin, which was commissioned by the ruler of Milan, Gian Galeazzo Visconti, in Italy in the late 14th century. A Book of Hours is a personal prayer book that contained, in part, the Hours of the Virgin, a daily devotional that was popular at the time. This particular Book of Hours was created by two master illuminators, beginning with Giovannino dei Grassi before his death, and completed by Luchino Belbello da Pavia.

The Visconti Hours is a classic example of the personal prayer books of the period, which were generally made for wealthy lay persons.

The book remained unfinished until after Visconti's (and the dei Grassi's) death. It is now in the Biblioteca Nazionale in Florence.

== Description ==
The pages are large in comparison to similar books, such as the Hours of Jeanne d’Evreux, measuring about 25 cm (9.8 in) in height and 17.9 cm (7 in) in width. They are decorated with different pigmented paints and ink on the vellum. The pigment used for the blue contained the rare lapis lazuli mixed with gum Arabic and the inks used for the texts are iron gall inks. The book has 636 pages containing 38 half to full-page miniatures and 90 historiated initials, with most pages still containing decoration throughout. Three types of gold were used in the creation of this text including gold emulsion and burnished gold leaf.

The pages are decorated in a distinctly Italian late Gothic style, containing symbol-like floral ornamentation that does not directly reference flowers or plants found in nature. The figures are depicted in a more realistic manner than figures found in earlier historical periods, but also reference a more Byzantine style that envelopes the figures by utilizing a background usually created with gold leaf. On multiple pages, the artists also inserted the Visconti family crest, consisting of a serpent devouring a child. Along with this, a cheetah is featured placed with the flora of paradise. This was put into the piece to serve as an emblem or a reflection on Giangaleazzo's menagerie at his castle, as well as gifts like the live hunting leopards that were sent to him by the Barqûq of Egypt, Mamluk Sultan.

== History and commission ==
Production of this codex is attributed to Frate Amedeo; Amadeo signed his work, which was not typical of the time period. It was commissioned by Gian Galeazzo Visconti in the late 14th century, but only completed after his death at the request of his son Filippo Maria Visconti. The first artist commissioned was the master Italian illuminator Giovannino dei Grassi; after the latter’s death the work was completed by Luchino Belbello da Pavia.

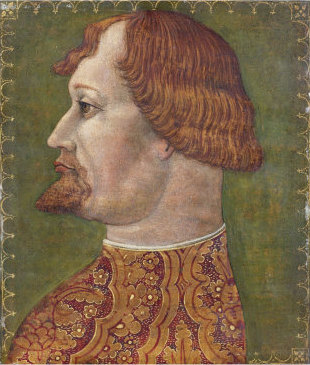
Gian Galeazzo Visconti, first Duke of Milan

Visconti was the first Duke of Milan. He had two marriages, an interest in hunting and exotic animals, a devotion to religion, and died in 1402 at 51 of a fever. He is accredited with creating the first modern bureaucracy due to the system of administration and programs he implemented, including a program of bookkeeping, "committing to books and ledgers the minutest items of his private expenditure and the outgoings of his public purse…"

== Artists ==
=== Giovannino dei Grassi ===
Born in Milan in about 1350, Giovannino dei Grassi was an Italian painter, sculptor, architect, and celebrated illuminator. He worked as an architect for the Milan Cathedral though he is better known for his works in illumination and painting. He is also well known for his notebook of drawings kept in the Library Angelo Mai of Bergamo. This notebook is considered one of the most important examples of late Gothic Italian art and consisted of scenes of daily activities, animals, and images from nature, as well as illuminated letters. He died on July 5th, 1398.

=== Luchino Belbello da Pavia ===
Belbello da Pavia was an Italian miniaturist and painter active between approximately 1430 and 1470. His life and career remained mostly undetected until the beginning of the twentieth century when two scholars, Toesca and Pacchioni, identified him. His style was influenced by the work of Giovannino dei Grassi, as well as that of Michelino da Besozzo. His contribution to the Offiziolo Visconti, the second half, is described primarily as an unusual chromatic fantasy. For the Creation of Eve he built a border with cheetahs, the Celestial Court, and Fall of the Rebel Angels.

== Gallery ==
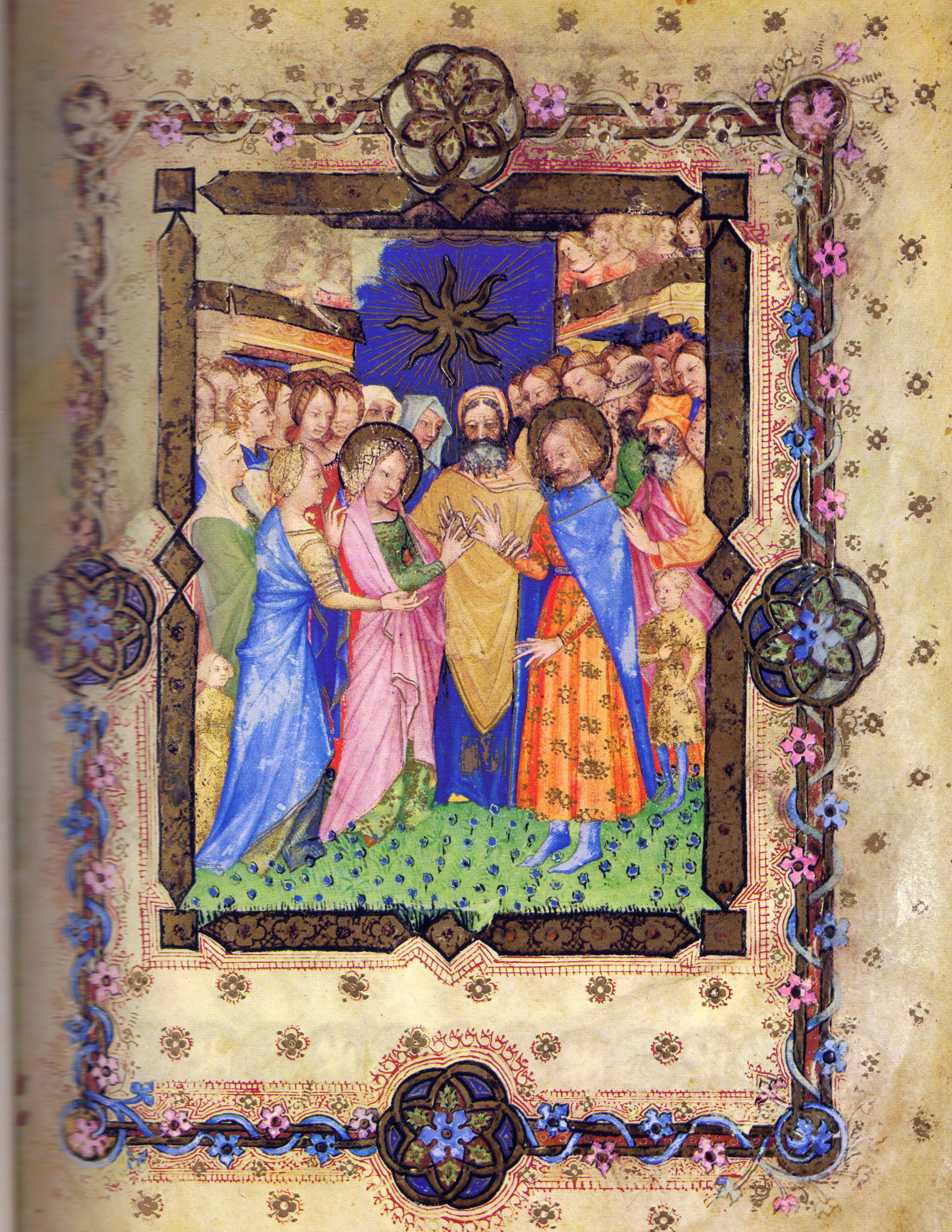
BR1: Marriage of Anna and Joachim

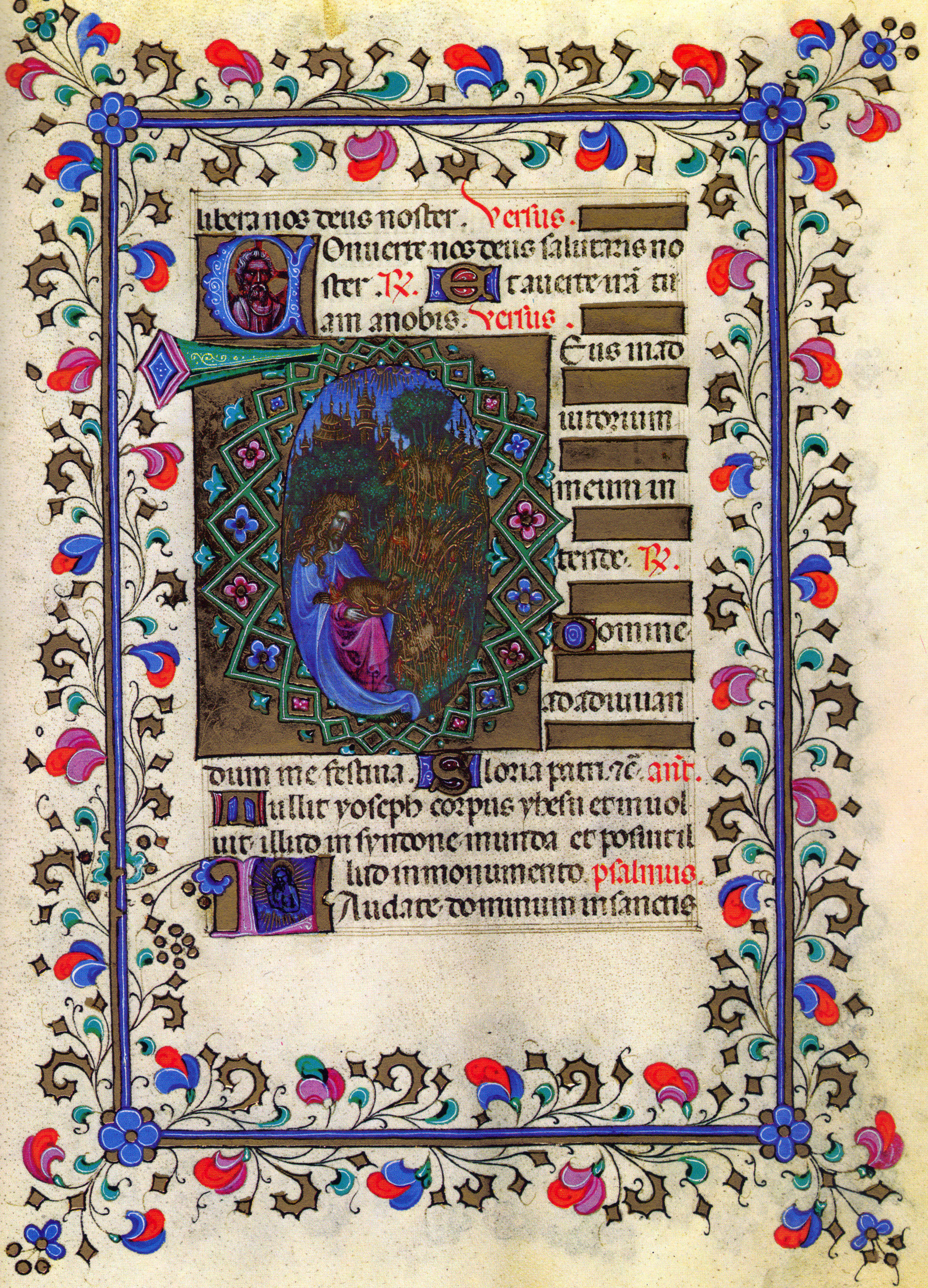
LF153: Foxes with Firebrands Judges 15

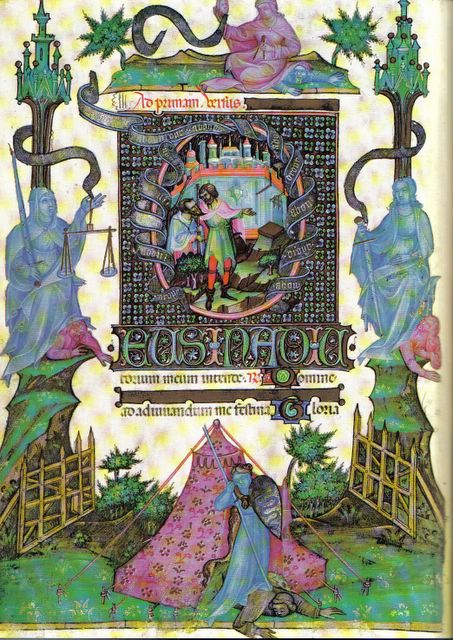
LF129v of the Visconti Hours

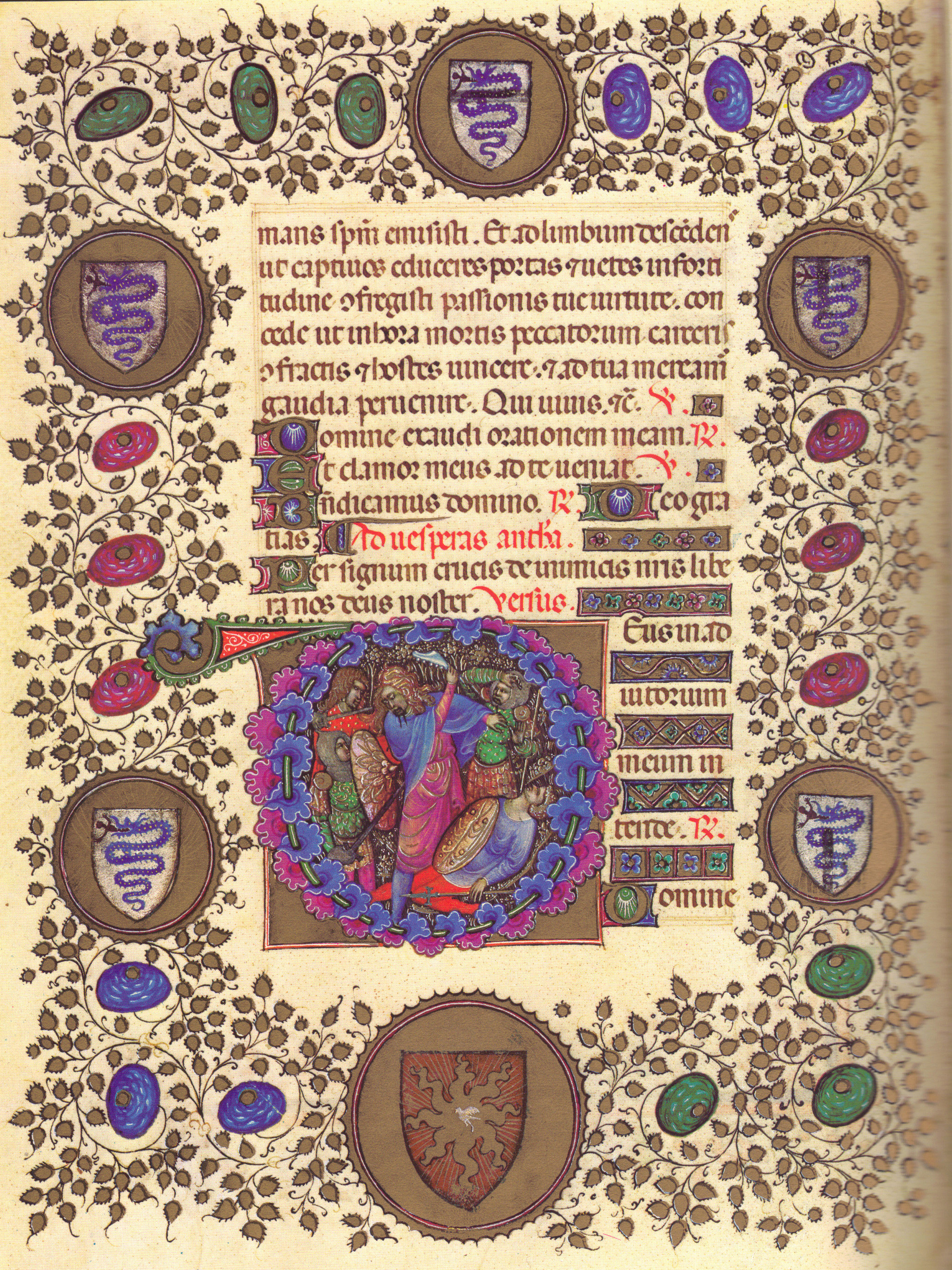
LF150v: Samson in battle

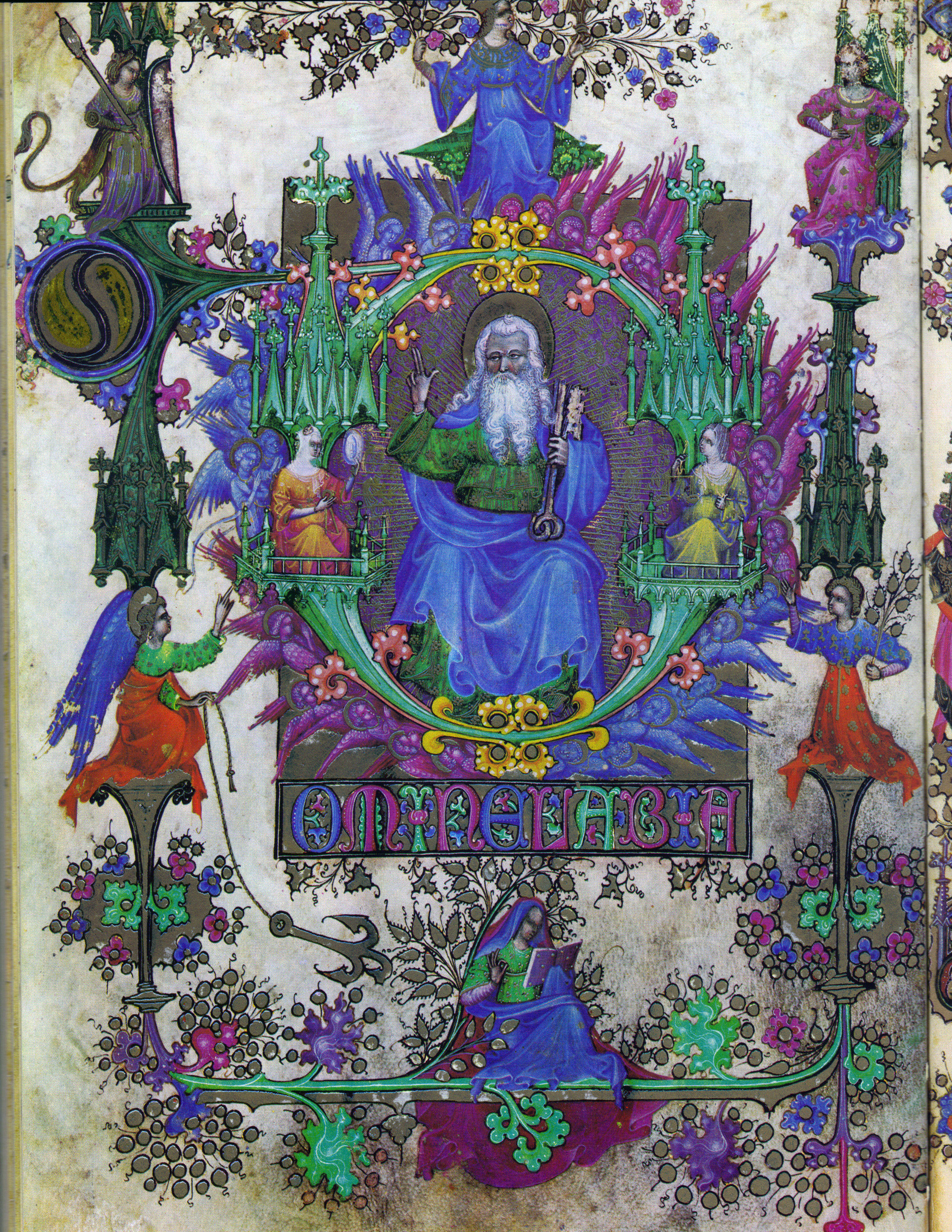
LF11v: Celestial Court

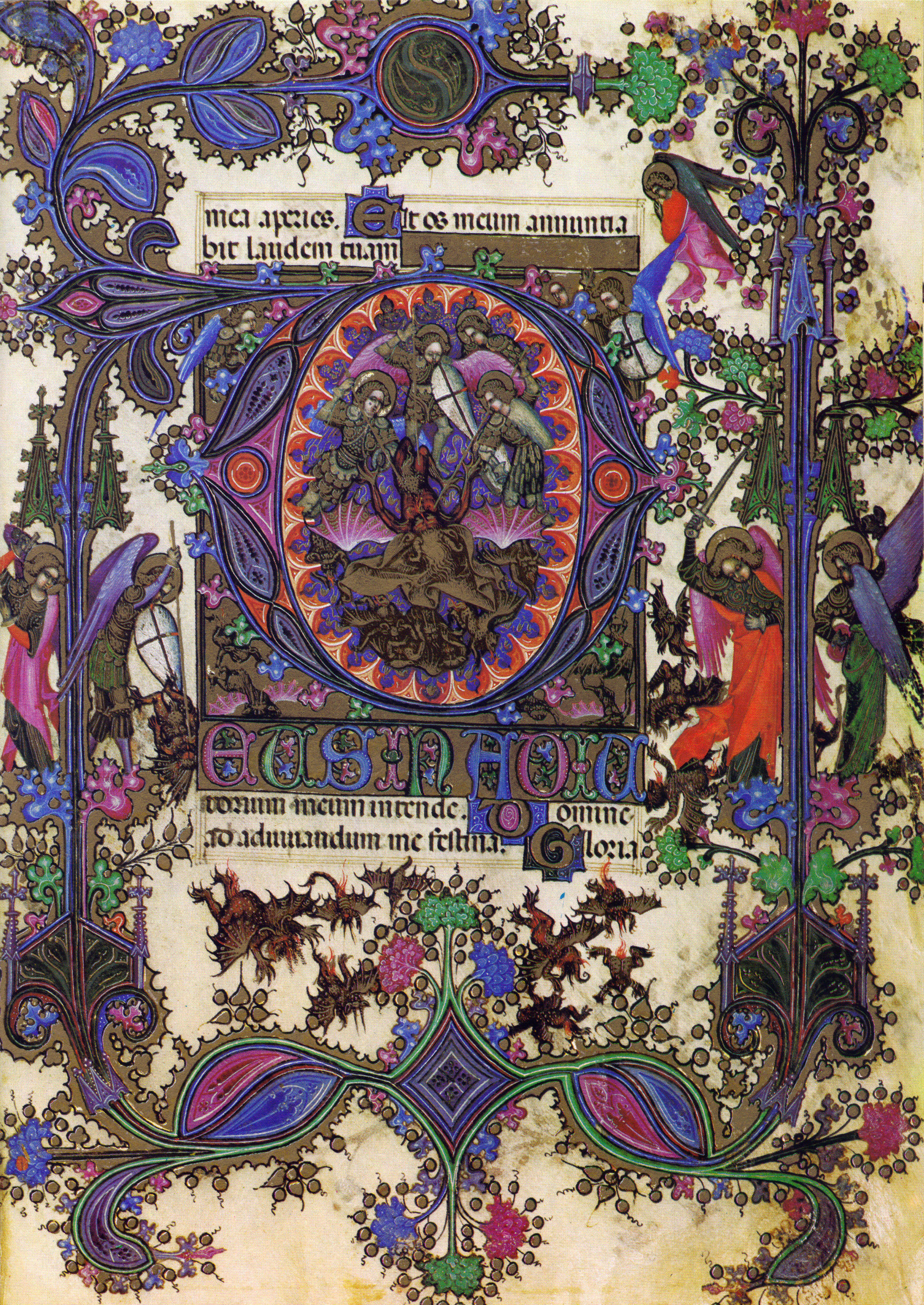
LF12: Fall of the Rebel Angels

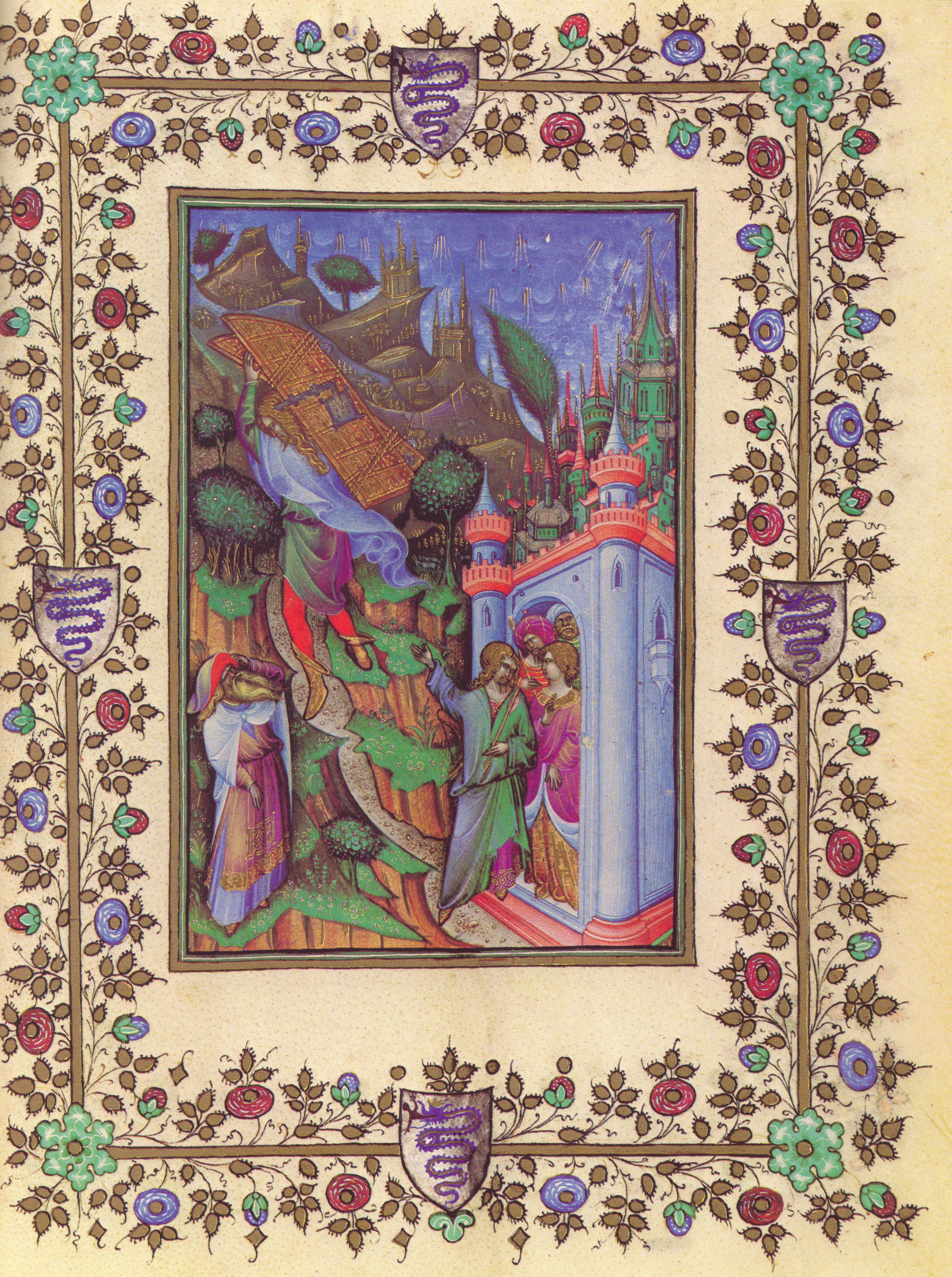
LF155: Samson steals the gates of Gaza Judges 16

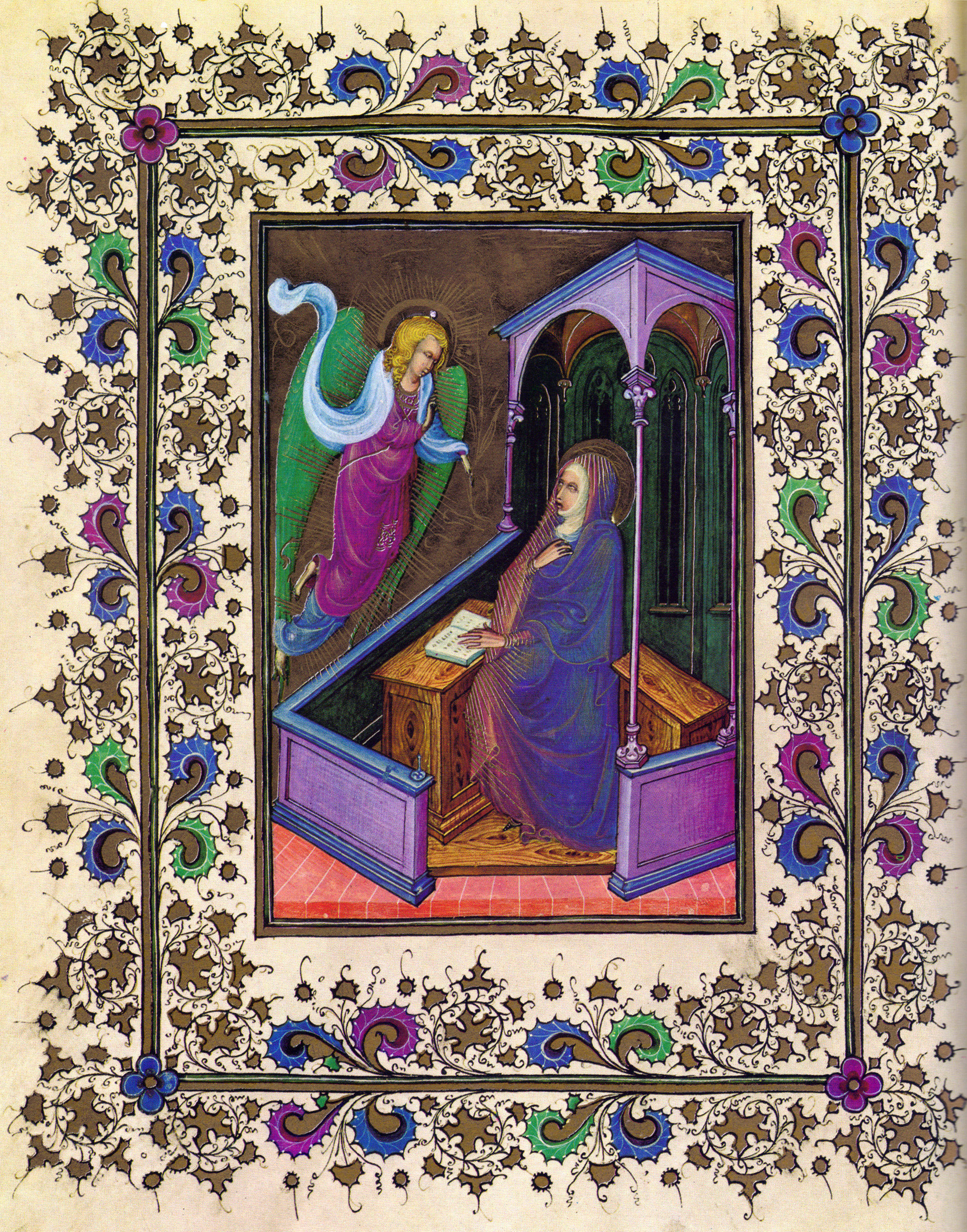
LF33v of the Visconti Hours

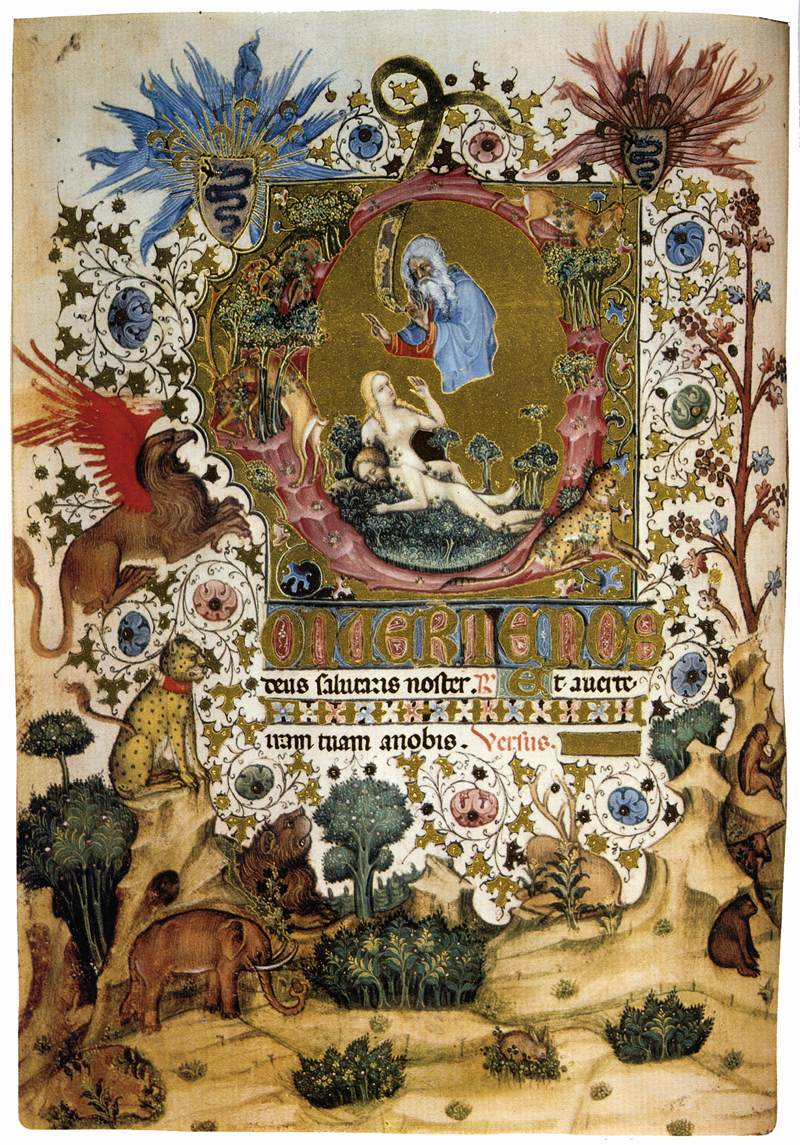
LF46v: Creation of Eve, attributed to Belbello da Pavia
