= Gugah =

Gugah (Persian: گوگاه) may refer to:

- Gugah, Rahimabad
- Gugah, Siyarastaq Yeylaq, Rahimabad District
