= Goggi =

Goggi (Icelandic: [ˈkɔcːɪ], Italian: [ˈɡɔddʒi]) is both an Icelandic given name and an Italian surname. Both originate from equivalents of the masculine given name George: in Icelandic, it is a pet name for Georg; in Italian, it is originally a patronymic from a pluralized form of Goggio (an old variant of Giorgio), and is chiefly found in the areas of Alessandria and Pavia.

Notable people with the name include:

== Given name ==
- Georg "Goggi" Hólm (born 1976), Icelandic bassist
- Georga "Goggi" Egede-Nissen (1871–1959), Norwegian politician

== Surname ==
- Daniela Goggi (born 1953), Italian singer and actress
- Emilia Goggi (1817–1857), Italian operatic mezzo-soprano
- Loretta Goggi (born 1950), Italian singer, actress and television presenter

== See also ==
- Goggi Mega, a character from LazyTown
- Gogi (disambiguation)
- Giorgi (surname)
- Goggio
