= Ġorġ =

George
- Pronunciation: /ˈdʒɔːrdʒ/ JORJ
- Gender: Male

Origin
- Language: Ancient Greek
- Meaning: "Farmer" or "Earthworker"
- Region of origin: Ancient Greece

Other names
- Variant form: Ġorġu
- Pet names: Ġorġinu, Ġo, Ġi

Ġorġ is a Maltese male given name, cognate to George. Its diminutives include Ġorġinu, Ġo and Ġi. Its feminine form is Ġorġa.

Notable people with the name include:

- Ġorġ Borg Olivier (1911–1980), Prime Minister of Malta from 1950 to 1955 and from 1962 to 1971
- Ġorġ Mallia (1957–2026), Maltese communications academic and cartoonist
- Ġorġ Mitrovich (1795–1885), Maltese patriot and politician
- Ġorġ Preca (1880–1962), Maltese Roman Catholic priest
