= Belbello da Pavia =

Italian painter

Belbello da Pavia, also known as Luchino Belbello from Pavia (d. c. 1470), was an Italian painter active between 1430 and 1462 and associated with Lombard book illumination. He was born in Pavia before soon moving to Milan where he caught the attention of Duke Filippo Maria Visconti. He was assigned to continue work on the Book of Hours of Gian Galeazzo Visconti, which he began sometime between 1412 and 1434. Belbello worked on it throughout different periods of his life, evident by his changing style in the illustrations. During the same years, he also worked on a Bible for Niccolo' III d'Este, a work finished by Jacopino d'Arezzo in 1434. Later in life, Belbello moved to Mantua, where he painted a Missal for Gianlucido Gonzaga (of the noble Gonzaga family) beginning in 1448. He was forced to leave Mantua because of moral misdemeanor in 1450 and returned to Pavia. In 1461, the Marchioness of Mantua, Barbara of Brandenburg, gave the work over to Girolamo da Cremona. The following year, after an unsuccessful attempt at appealing the Marchioness's decision, Belbello moved to Venice where he lived until his death.

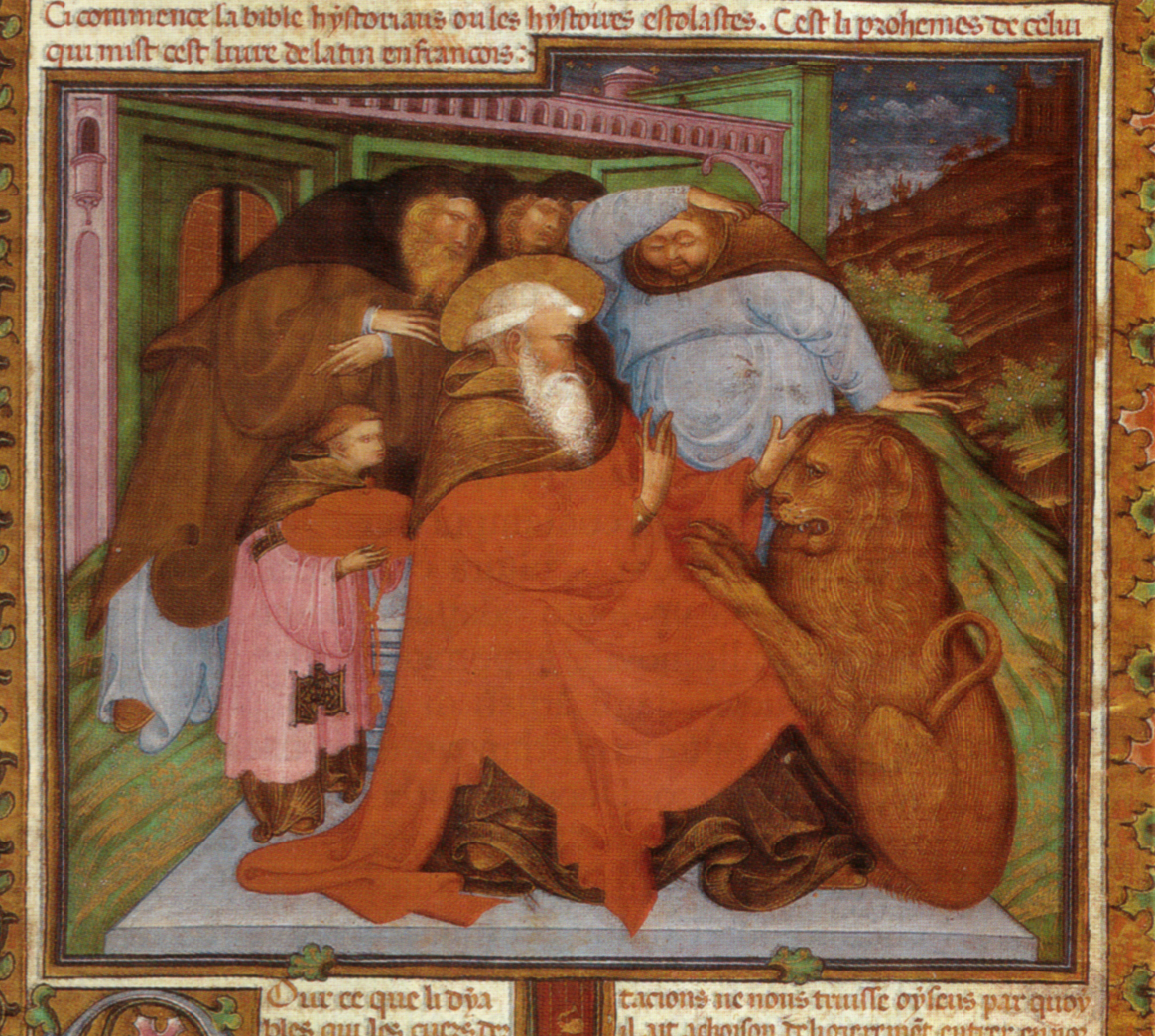
St. Jerome by Belbello da Pavia, from illuminated Bible of Niccolò d'Este, Vatican Library, 1440–1450

== Life ==
Belbello's background is relatively unknown, with no information regarding his year of birth and first formal training. His personal life remains a mystery due to a lack of documentation. His place of birth is one of the only things that is verified, with that being Pavia in the Lombard province. It is known that at a young age Belbello left for Milan where he met the Duke, Filippo Visconti.

Still working on the Book of Hours, Belbello worked for Niccolo' III d'Este in illustrating a bible. This was later taken over by Jacopino who completed it. Belbello is noted to have been in Mantua during 1448 where he worked for Gonzaga on a Missal. During his time there, Belbello eventually faced burning at the stake and was forced to flee due to a moral misdemeanor he was accused of in 1450. He stayed in contact with the Gonzaga family even after he returned to Pavia after his retreat from Mantua.

In 1461 Belbello was stripped of his task of working on the Missal by Barbara of Brandenburg, Marchioness of Mantua, in favor of a younger artist, Girolamo da Cremona. This was due to Belbello falling out of favor with the Marchioness, as his work no longer satisfied her. His replacement had based his models on Ferrarese as well as Mantegna. Belbello tried to appeal to the Marchioness, which subsequently failed and forced him to stop working on it. In 1462 Belbello seems to have been working for the Duchess of Milan for a short stint, as evident by a letter dated 1462.

After 1461 Belbello's style changed, becoming much more monumental and embracing artistic qualities from the Renaissance. This change in style is attributed to his forceful exit from his work on the Missal by the Marchioness of Mantua as well as his replacement with a younger artist who was more in style. His newer works offer a glimpse into the internal struggle of Belbello as he grappled with his old age and the changing taste of the public. Belbello is then thought to have returned to Venice where he stayed until his death, and where his style remained popular. Four pieces connect the artist to the city: A frontispiece of a manuscript in the Marciana, a manuscript in the Kupferstichkabinett, a Psalter in the British Museum, and an Antiphonary in the Monastery of S. Giorgio Maggiore in Venice.

Belbello was among the artists gravitating around the workshop of active Pavia miniaturists. His artistic tendencies were formed in the wake of Lombardy artists such as Michelino Molinari da Besozzo, as well as being somewhat influenced by French miniaturists. Some of his work also seems to be influenced by Michele Giambono, especially in Seated Evangelist, which has similarities to Giambono's St. Michael in the way its figure is spatially placed.

== Modern rediscovery ==
Belbello remained unrecognized until the early twentieth century when Pietro Toesca attributed the style of the miniatures in the d'Este Bible to the illustrations found in the 2nd half of the Visconti Hours. Before Toesca's discovery, his works were often attributed to the French school, the schools of Siena, Bologna, and the Marches, as well as other artists such as Giovanni di Paolo and Sano di Pierto. Using letters from the Gonzaga family concerning the artist responsible for part of the illustrations in a Missal, Toesca was able to identify the Belbello mentioned in the correspondence. Toesca had attributed 12 works from the Kann Collection to a follower of Belbello from Venice in 1930, but in 1951, Professor Mario Salmi determined that they were products of Belbello. There was some controversy regarding fol. 57v of the Visconti Hours, which Toesci had credited to Belbello, despite some differences in the style when compared to his other illustrations located in the book. Samek-Ludovici rejected Toesci's attribution of the work on the grounds that it was too much of a departure from Belbello's style, being much coarser in nature and with sharper colors when compared to Belbello's other illustrations. Samek-Ludovici then attributed the work to a Master X, an unknown artist. Mirella Levi D'Ancona, author of The Wildenstein Collection of Illuminations: The Lombard School, reasons that this conflict in style was due to a difference in their dates of production. She argues that due to some particularities in the design of Filippo Maria's portrait in fol. 57v, that the work must have been started after the Duke's death in 1447. The details in question are the inclusion of clouds surrounding Filippo's bust as rays of light radiate outward, glorification that would be inappropriate if the Duke had still been living when it began. Thus she states that Belbello's work on the Book of Hours must have been interrupted by the Duke's death while he was working in Mantua for the Gonzagas, and he resumed his work when he was forced to flee in 1461.

A "Master of Murano" was identified in an essay by Serena Padovani, in which she argues that this miniaturist was a major influence on a specific fresco-artist who had worked on the Chapel of the Rocca of Vignola, a small agricultural center south of Modena. This building featured frescoes that are dated stylistically to about 1425 and was an object of interest due to the artist's anonymity and apparent influence from this miniaturist. The connection was formed due to sharply cut drapery folds predominantly featured in the miniaturist's work which was also found on the frescoes. She also argued for the Master's influence on Ferrarese late Gothic art as well as on Belbello. This Master was then identified as Belbello himself in a response to the essay by Miklos Boskovits in the catalog of the exhibition "Arte in Lombardia fra gotico e rinascimento".

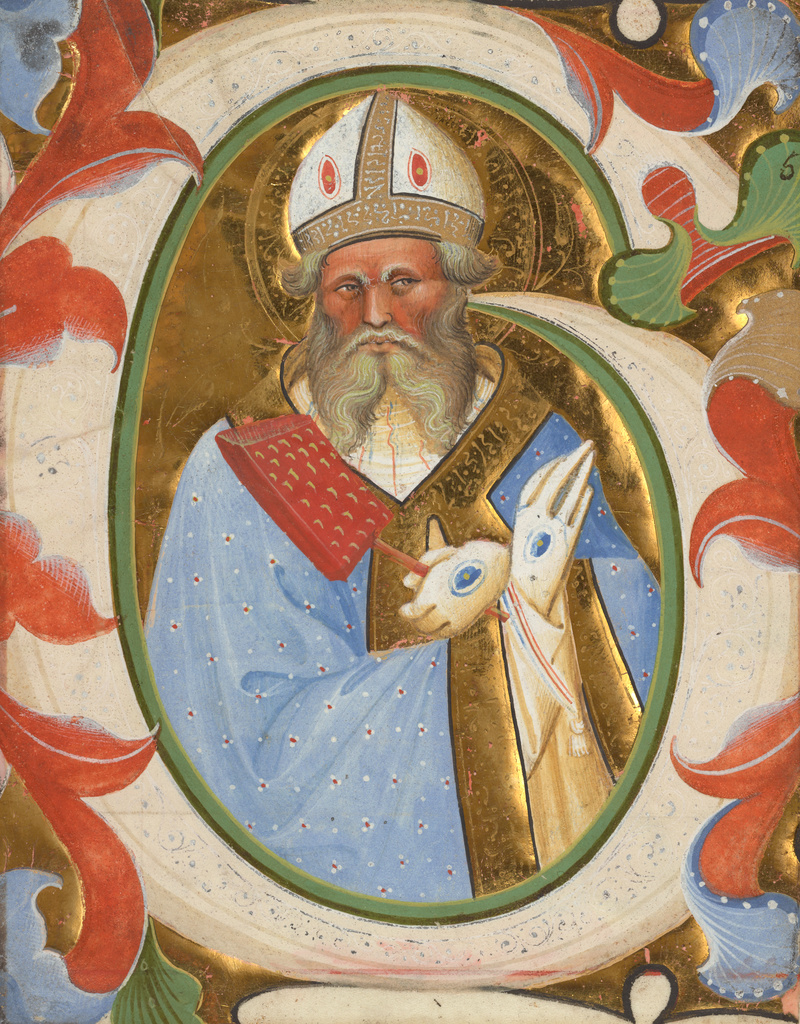
Initial G: Saint Blaise; Master of the Murano Gradual; Venice or Lombardy, Italy; about 1450–1460; tempera and gold on parchment

=== Master of the Murano Gradual ===
Some work formerly attributed to Belbello has now been thought to come from a close collaborator known as the "Master of the Murano Gradual". This artist seems to implement the style of Belbello but his art features figures that are more broadly conceived and more fleshed out, with serious expressions. His name comes from a type of choir book known as a gradual he worked on that only exists in loose leaf sheets in various collections. The book is thought to come from the Camaldolese monastery of San Michele in Murano, and the Master is thought to have been one of the most distinctive illustrators who worked on illuminating manuscripts in Northern Italy.

The initial "I" with the holy Pope, found in the West Bohemian Museum in Plzen, was thought to have been the work of Belbello at first but is now thought to have been done by a potential successor to Belbello who was potentially from Venice. The work retains Belbello's humor and elegance yet is also much more serious and emotional than his predecessor's work.

=== Follower of Belbello ===
The figures known as Sts. Cosmas and Damian- Initial O are not by Belbello although they share a striking resemblance to his body of work. They seem to have been made by a follower of his who also may have worked with Belbello on the Antiphonary M of S. Giorgio Maggiore in Venice. He seems to be from Padua or Bologna and his work, unlike Belbello, utilizes strong shadows and very defined planes. This work might come from the Antiphonary of St. Giorgio in Venice, much like the St. Catherine piece, as well as Belbello's The Annunciation seem to originate from. All three share a similar style in regards to their treatment of the initial and include 3 white dots gathered to form a triangle. This work has a coarser way of painting features than Belbello does and uses brown shading in its figures. It lacks the bright colors Belbello is known for.

== Works ==
Belbello's earliest and most prominent work involved his contributions to the Book of Hours of Gian Galeazzo Visconti, a work entrusted to him by the Duke of Milan, Filippo Maria Visconti. The work had been started in 1390 by Giovannino de Grassi and his son Salomone after it was commissioned by the Duke of Milan, Giangaleazzo Visconti, but had been interrupted twice. The first interruption was due to the death of Giovannino in 1398 and the second due to the death of Giangaleazzo Visconti in 1402. It was entrusted to Belbello in 1412 when Filippo Maria became the Duke after the assassination of his older brother, Giovanni Maria. The Visconti Hours seems to show an already developed style despite some imitation of his predecessors who had worked on the book previously. This is mentioned in commentary located earlier in the miniatures where Belbello states his desire to mimic dei Grassi's style. However, there is no homogeneity in the work done by Belbello, with variations in style being present throughout the book. According to art historian Millard Meiss, author of The Visconti Hours, some of these differences are thought to be due to the work of assistants in completing illustrations for Belbello. Meiss attributed the massiveness of certain works, or parts of works, to either Belbello's own evolving style or the work of associates. The Book of Hours of Gian Galeazzo Visconti is currently stored in two different collections, one in Milan called the Collection Visconti di Modrone which features pages that were solely done by Giovannino and his school and the other located in the National Library in Florence, collection Landau Finaly Ms. 22, which has works from Giovannino and Salomone but also includes the continuation by Belbello.

Belbello then worked on a Breviary on behalf of Marie of Savoy, Duchess of Milan (1432) and the Bible Estense (1434), the latter highlighting an original expressionism and a narrative sequence.

The works of his artistic maturity, however, include a Gradual, commissioned by Cardinal Bessarion and a Roman Missal for the Mantua Cathedral, in which his forms assumed greater fullness with effects that closely resembled Baroque tendencies. He produced Illuminated manuscripts for the most prominent clients in northern Italy, using an original style inspired by the grotesque vein and expressiveness of the International Gothic style.

In the miniatures of the Bible for Niccolò d'Este (1431-1434) Belbello painted imposing figures, flowing lines, and excessive gestures with bright colors. Belbello remained faithful throughout his long career to the Gothic style, seldom breaking away completely from this style and instead adapting and modernizing it to his audience's taste. His death was in 1470.

=== Other works ===
The Mission of the Apostles

The miniature illustrates the group of Apostles gathering after the death of the Virgin and Pentecost in a last prayer. It was here that they decided to preach the gospel, with the world being split up into sections for Apostles to teach. It is a rare scene to be commemorated as it is often melded together with the Pentecost. The differentiation between the two events is mostly shown through the absence of the Virgin Mary as well as the locale where the Apostles were gathered when the Holy Spirit came down.

The rocky landscape where the scene takes place is a conscious choice by Belbello. He shows them engaging in prayer while the Dove of the Holy Ghost is handed down to the Apostles. The trees seem to bend as if they are taking part in the prayer, while rabbits are shown hiding in their burrows. The two saints who are identifiable in the work are St. Peter and St. John the Evangelist. St. Peter is placed in the middle of the scene, an allusion to his central position in the Christian church, while St. John's youth and the Book of Revelation he holds both serve as indicators of his identity. The inclusion of 13 apostles in the scene shows Belbello's acceptance of St. Paul as an Apostle despite his joining much later. St. Barnabas is also shown in the illustration, and he serves as the replacement for Judas following his betrayal of Jesus.

This work accompanies the hymn "Inclitus", and contains the first word of the hymn in the image's frame. The word was added after the illustration's completion, evident by the markings overlapping the lowest garments of the Apostles. The left border is decorated by alternating black and white-robed monks while the bottom holds the figure of the Virgin holding the Christ Child with a white-robed bishop and black-robed bishop placed on both sides. The miniature is thought to have been made for a Benedictine monastery, with the black robes being the original robe of the Order and the white robes being those worn by reformed Benedictines. The earliest record of the image is thought to be included in the Ottley Catalogue, which indicates that the image comes from Camaldolese Monastery of St. Michele in Murano, an elegant church that thrived during the Renaissance of Venice. It housed a prosperous community of monks and also served as an important scriptorium during the 15th and 16th centuries. During Napoleon I's occupation of Venice, troops stripped the church of its precious library which had housed thousands of books. The island was subsequently abandoned by the Camaldolese monks and eventually turned into a cemetery. An educated Abbot of S. Michele created a catalogue of the library during the late 18th century, but it lacked the choir book's inclusion due to their use in church. Therefore, it is hard to verify the history of the illumination. What is known about it is that it is a Belbello piece from a late period and that there is marked influence of Michele Giambono on the faces of the Apostles.

The colors of the piece are light and bright with a frame that imitates a painted wooden frame, colored black, green, and red on a white ground and inlaid blue stones. This decoration was used commonly in Florence but alien to Lombardy.

St. Augustine- Initial I

This is taken most likely from the beginning of the Mass of St. Augustine. The initial seems to belong to the phrase "In medio Ecclesiae," a segment of the Common of Doctors. The image depicts the saint with the initial I covered with blue and pink leaves. The colored palmette seems to come from Florence. The black robe that is worn belongs to the Augustinians, decorated with an imitation of a golden embroidery. St. Augustine holds a pale blue book and he wears a white miter. His skin has a brownish hue that is harsh against white facial hair. Roundels in the golden background are white and bordered with ink.

St. Julian (or St. Paul?)- Initial S

This miniature showcases a saint, thought to be either St. Julian or St. Paul, menacingly staring at the viewer. He holds an item that is a cross between a sword and cross. He was originally thought to have been St. Paul by Boinet, but his clothing is different from the traditional garb of St. Paul. This depiction also lacks his striking pointed beard which is found in another illustration from the Wildenstein collection. The figure seems less a saint than an Italian thug yet the dagger is also thought to relate to St. Julian who killed his parents with a dagger, following a prophecy. St. Julian was declared a saint after a life of self-sacrifice and atonement as well as his final martyrdom, and his life seems to be a counterpart to the Oedipus legend. This identification is not fully accepted by scholars because of uncertainty that what he holds is actually a dagger, and his depiction does not follow the tradition of showing him as a young man.

He wears a pinkish garment with black sleeves and green-lined red mantle. His hair and beard are both a yellowish brown, while his face seems to have been damaged somehow. The initial S is a blue with pink and brown palmettes, while the background and roundels suggest that this piece was made alongside another illustration, St. Paul.

St. Paul- Initial S

The apostle is shown pointing to the heaven, already in old age. The sword in his left hand is his identifying emblem, and his history involves a time when he was a fierce opponent of the Christian faith as a Roman officer. After his conversion, he used the same passion he had as an officer to work for the church as one of its most devoted followers of the faith. He was arrested in Rome where he had gone to the Imperial Court to convert the people there. There he was condemned to death and was beheaded as opposed to burning on the Cross due to his Roman citizenship. The instrument that caused his death had then become his pervasive symbol in art for his identity.

Belbello depicts the saint with a greenish mantle with an orange lining and golden embroidery, and he is holding his gray sword. His hair is a yellowish brown while his skin is a tan color, and his beard is pointed as a way of more easily identifying the saint. The Initial is mix of several colors: orange-red, pink, green, and blue, while the background is a golden color which appears to have flaked.

An Apostle (or Martyr Saint?)

The figure may represent a saint, specifically St. John or St. Philip, or just a Christian martyr. He wears the clothes of an Apostle but from his hands foliage seems to bloom, indicating that it may represent the palm of martyrdom. The image lacks context of where it was originally located in a Sanctoral as well as a distinguishing emblem, and thus its identity remains unknown. The miniature seems to have come from a choir book that holds two sections for saints, the Proper of Saints and another for the Common of Saints. The Proper of Saints holds offices for particular saints while the other is devoted to a general class of saint. As such, the Proper of Saints has illustrations for a particular person as well as an individual prayer, with the image hosting an emblem to easily identify the saint. The Common of Saints has prayers that are much more generalized, going from the Apostles to the Doctors of the Church and then Virgin Martyrs and so on. The image is also a general representation of that class of saint. Without the original context of the image, it is impossible to distinguish the figure and in which category it belongs.

The saint is shown wearing a red tunic with a white border as well as a green mantel that is lined with pink. His complexion is a dark tan but also include white highlights. The foliage, which is red, green, blue, and pinkish brown, seem to come from his hands. The golden background shows signs of significant damage, such as cracks.

St. Stephen- Initial E

The stones on top of his head and shoulders serve as the identifier for St. Stephen, as it was the weapon of his martyrdom, as well as the figure's youth and his clothing. Belbello has the stones flattened on both shoulders while the one on his head is dripping with blood.

The saint wears a blue dalmatic that is lined with gold and a purplish neckband, and his sleeves are both red and purple. The Initial E that encapsulates the saint is red and has green leaves and pink palmettes.

St. Margaret- Initial C (?)

The inclusion of the dragon relates to the story of St. Margaret, in which she was swallowed whole by the creature but was unscathed after she was able to exit. Belbello's decision to make her mouth agape is most likely to give the illusion that she is thanking God, but the created effect by pacing the dragon opposite gives an odd visual. The colors are bright, the green of the dragon is stark against the orange-red and blue initial. The saint wears a pink dress that is blue-lined, along with a brownish-gold mantel. This is set to a golden background that is covered in leaves. The saint shows no sign of gentleness that is typical of the female depictions of the time. As a result of this, Boinet, an art historian, has called the figure "a male Saint menaced by a snake". Daisies in the background might serve as an allusion to the name Margaret, as in Italian daisies are called "margherita". The face seems to be softer than those given to men by Belbello, and this along with the dragon help identify the saint depicted in the miniature.

Holy Bishop

Similar to "An Apostle" it is hard to determine who exactly the figure is supposed to represent. The saint seems to be holding something although there is nothing in his hand, although it could have been the mark of St. Nicholas of Bari: three golden balls. However, the figure could quite as easily be merely a representation of bishops in general. There is extensive damage in the miniature, with the upper half of the saint's crozier being gone. The saint has a cope with a white surplice underneath and wears a white miter with green and lined with blue. The cope is also a light brown with white and red mixed into its design and also has an orange-red border. The initial itself is incomplete and thus the letter cannot be identified, all is known is that the color is a faded grey with a blue lining and also has red and green leaves.

Old bearded Saint with a book- (St. John the Evangelist?)- Initial M

The Initial is an M with an older saint wearing a blue robe and a green-line pink mantle. In his hands is a book that is pressed against the blue and white initial. The background of the piece is gold with flowered rinceaux in its engraved design. His halo is rimmed red and his identity could be that of St. John, a saint who actually lived to old age after surviving his martyrdom. In that case the book he holds would be either Revelations or the fourth Gospel. However the clothes in the miniature are unlike his traditional clothing: a red or pink mantle.

Seated Evangelist- Initial S(?)

This miniature seems to hold a much more Venetian approach that Belbello's other works, with the golden background exchanged for a deeper red. There also seems to be some influence from Venetian painter Michele Giambono, especially in the fluid handling of the draperies and the disheveled hair on the figure. The golden rinceaux in the background is a style that came to Venice from Cristoforo Cortese, who had gained the knowledge from his time in Bologna. This is a style that was heavily used by Niccolo di Giacomo da Bologna, and it was originally imported from France in the early 14th century. Its use here seems to corroborate the notion that Belbello spent his later life in Venice, as it exhibits Venetian characteristics.

The saint himself has a bumpy plasticity that is striking against the fluid character of the clothes. There are some typical Belbello qualities in the figure: such as the frown and sidelong glance, and the color palette. The colors are bright, with a grey green-lined mantle and blue tunic with a red and gold band. There appears to be an attempt at some imitation of inlaid wood with the throne with a red and blue design, and the floor is a red tiled. The saint's gold halo also appears to be solid and opaque. This figure is different from a lot of his other work as it shows the full length of the figure instead of the usual partial depiction of his subjects. This work seems more similar to the Antiphonary in Berlin, which seems to have been illuminated by Belbello and his school.

St. George?

This miniature is damaged quite badly but the head is preserved, and may belong to St. George. The saint seems to have worn a gold armor with a white robe that was decorated with a golden cross. He is also thought to have worn a golden mantle that is red-lined on top of this, yet because of paint losses these details are mostly gone. What is visible is a white flag that the saint carries with a red cross across it. The plethora of warrior saints in Christianity, such as St. George, St. Liberale, St. Maurice, St. Theodore, etc., make it hard to identify whom the figure is meant to represent. This is thought to be St. George, although this only because he is the most common of the warrior saints to be depicted. It also worth noting that St. George is the patron saint of the Monastery of S. Giorgio Maggiore in Venice, the place where Belbello worked during his later life. The initial is impossible to make out due to its extensive damage, but might have been an "N".

St. Catherine of Alexandria (St. Justine or Padua?)- Initial R

Depicting a noble saint, this miniature features a female figure that has been identified as St. Catherine. However this cannot be proved as there seem to be no adequate emblems in the illustration to fully distinguish this saint from St. Justine and St. Catherine. The figure holds an open book in her hands and also has a sword lodged within her chest, with the palm of martyrdom bearing some fruit that is likely dates. St. Catherine's legend has her tortured on a wheel before she is miraculously saved, only to be subsequently beheaded. The dates on the palm could be a reference to St. Catherine's origins in Egypt. Belbello probably lacked sufficient knowledge in anatomy as the sword is placed on the wrong side of her chest, not where the heart is actually located. The lack of the wheel and inclusion of the sword led to Boinet to identify her as St. Justine, who was usually depicted with a sword in the neck. The botanical accuracy of this piece is questionable, as dates grow in clusters around the tree trunk. Instead he depicts them hanging from the branch in a single line.

The initial "R" is blue with a white design and green foliage emit from the right-side of the initial. She wears a green dress and a pink mantel with gold stars and embroideries, and has a golden crown decorated with various precious stones on top of her head. Her clothing is close to her body, and appears to be wrapped tight. The technique Belbello utilizes has the color model the form by shading and differentiating the material from the crown to the hair. This work shows his tendency to conventionalize his style to fit the period and audience, and this piece is one of his only to completely adhere to the Renaissance style. His objective here seems to be to show off an idealized type of beauty in a state of tranquility.

Old Man in Prayer with a Youth Behind Him (Saul and David?)- Initial S

Depicted in this image is an older man in what seems to be pain, twisted and staring up to the heavens in prayer. The initial S seems to follow his erratic and tireless movement, sweeping with the man. The younger person behind the man fills up the empty space, offering his hand up to receive something. His inclusion detracts from the tense atmosphere following the man's actions and demeanor. Although his identity is unknown, he resembles somewhat St. John in the Poldi Pezzoli Museum in Milan. There is some thought that the man might be King Saul who could be repenting for his treatment of David earlier in his youth, although he lacks the crown that is his emblem of a crown and the youth lacks David's signature harp.

The S is an orange-red with grey, green, and blue leaves and the figure wears a blue robe with darker blue shades in it. The youth wears a green garment and has brown hair, both of the figures have striking white in their eyes that is compelling against the color of their skin.

St. Mary Magdalene- Initial G

The box of ointments that the figure holds makes her identifiable as St. Mary Magdalene, and her figure seems to be a mix of Belbello's more conventional style and the plasticity of his other figures, and is possibly from the artist's latest period. This figure shows a strong resemblance to those of Lorenzo Monaco's middle period, along with his earlier works, showing the influence of other masters on Belbello.

She wears a red-lined green dress with embedded golden decorations and has a golden mantle with pink lining on over it. The initial in the picture, G, surrounds her figure and is blue with a red inner rim. Also typical of Belbello's other works, there is a golden background which the figure is placed on.

=== Gallery ===
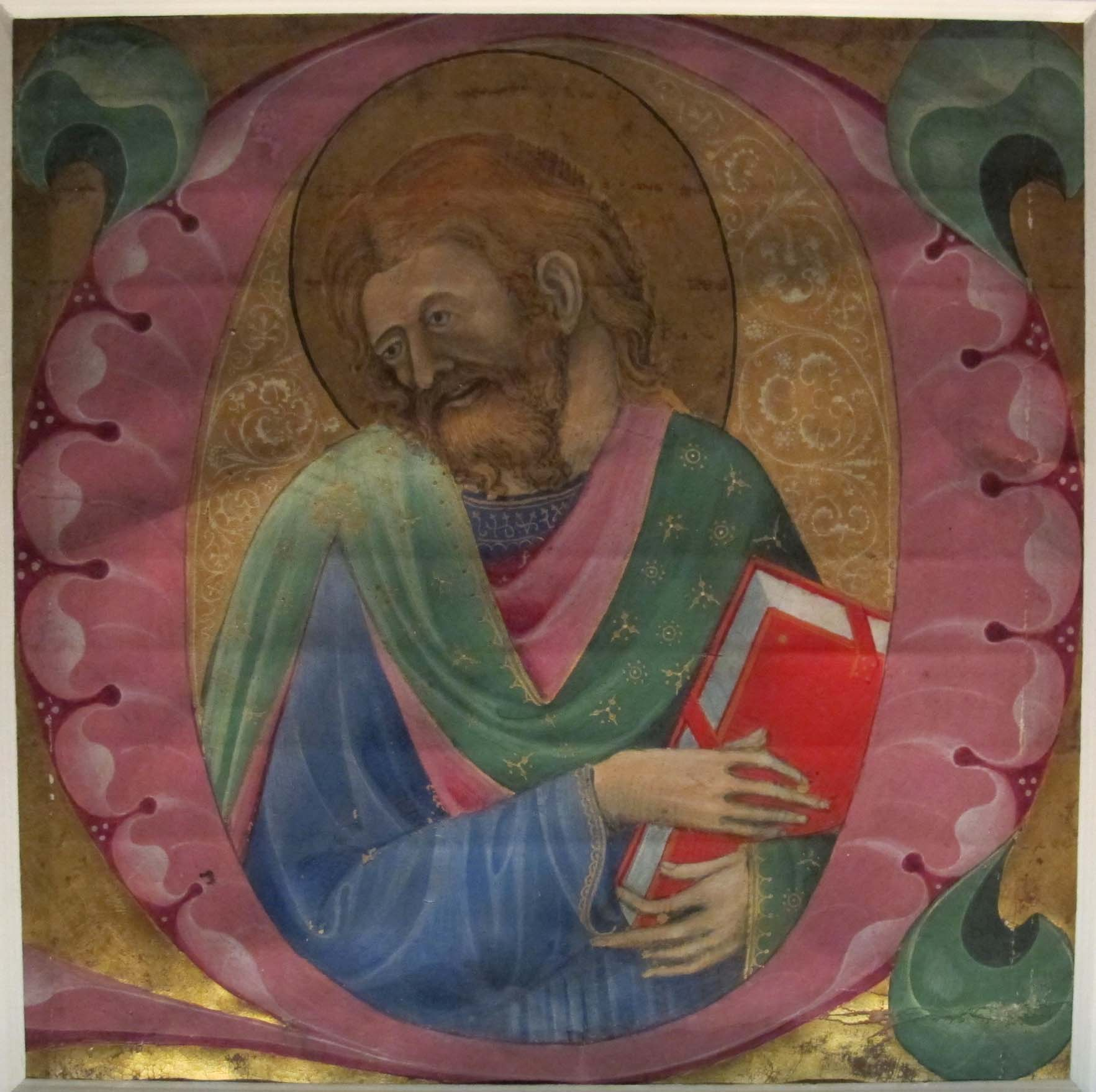

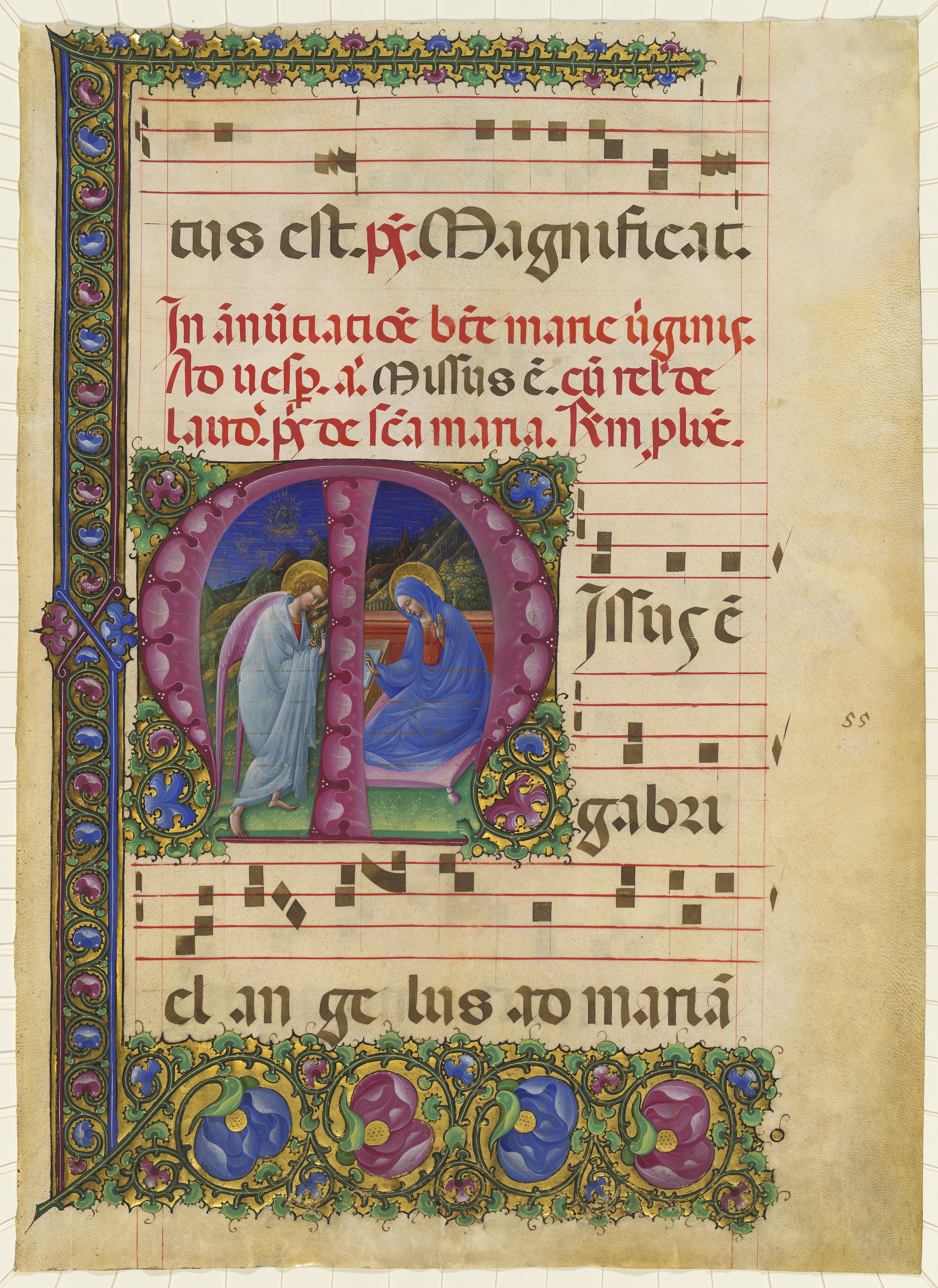

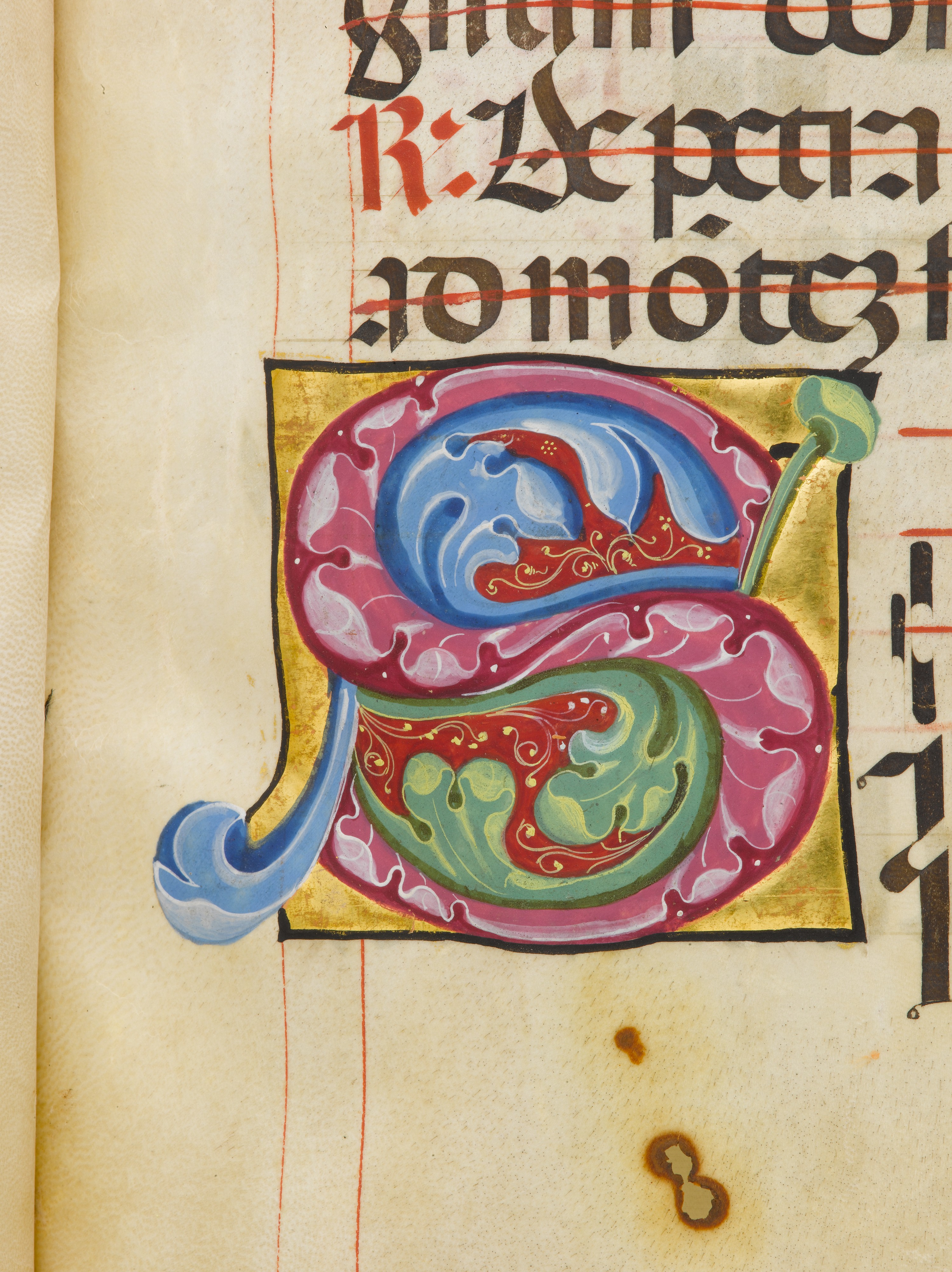

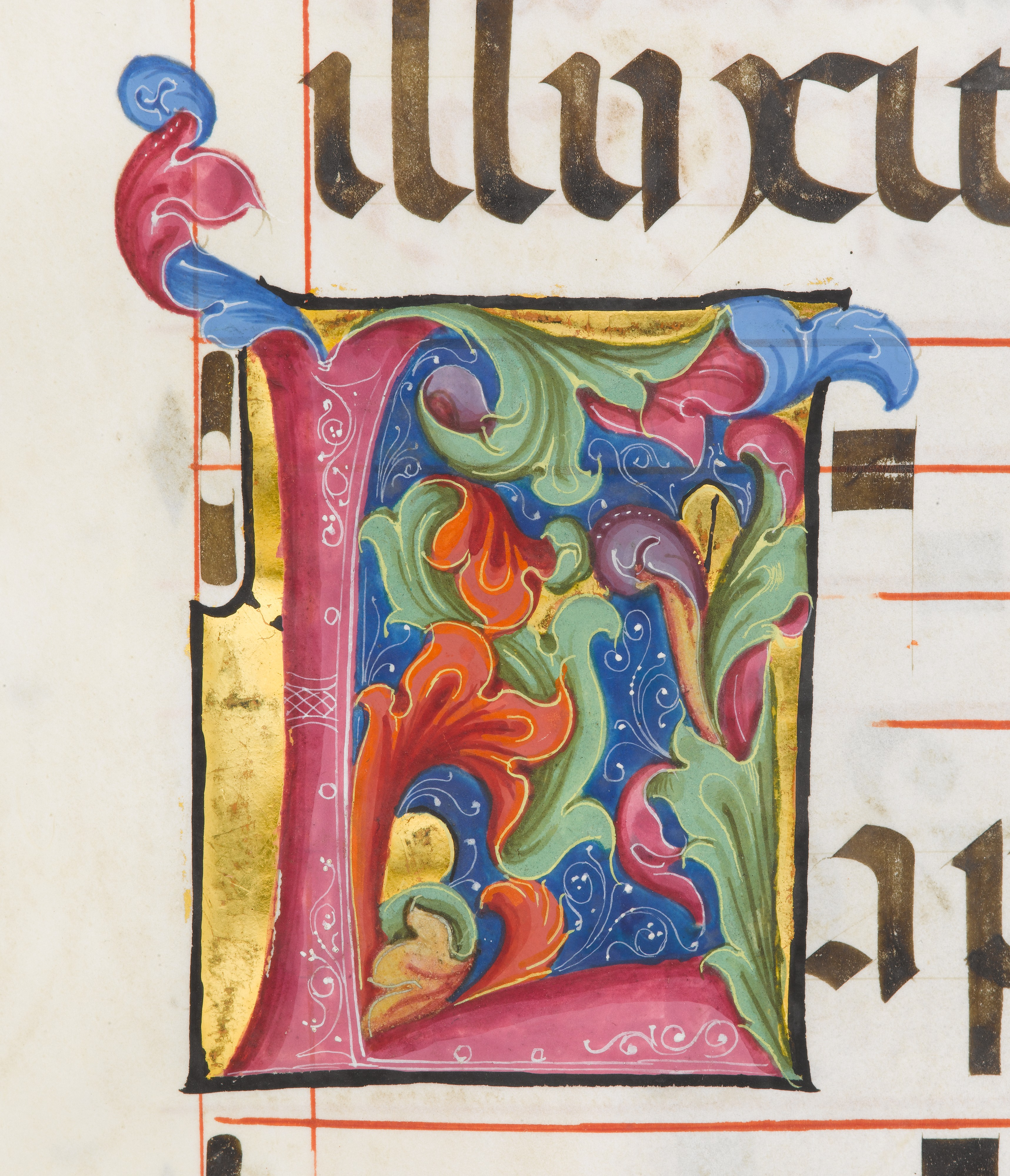

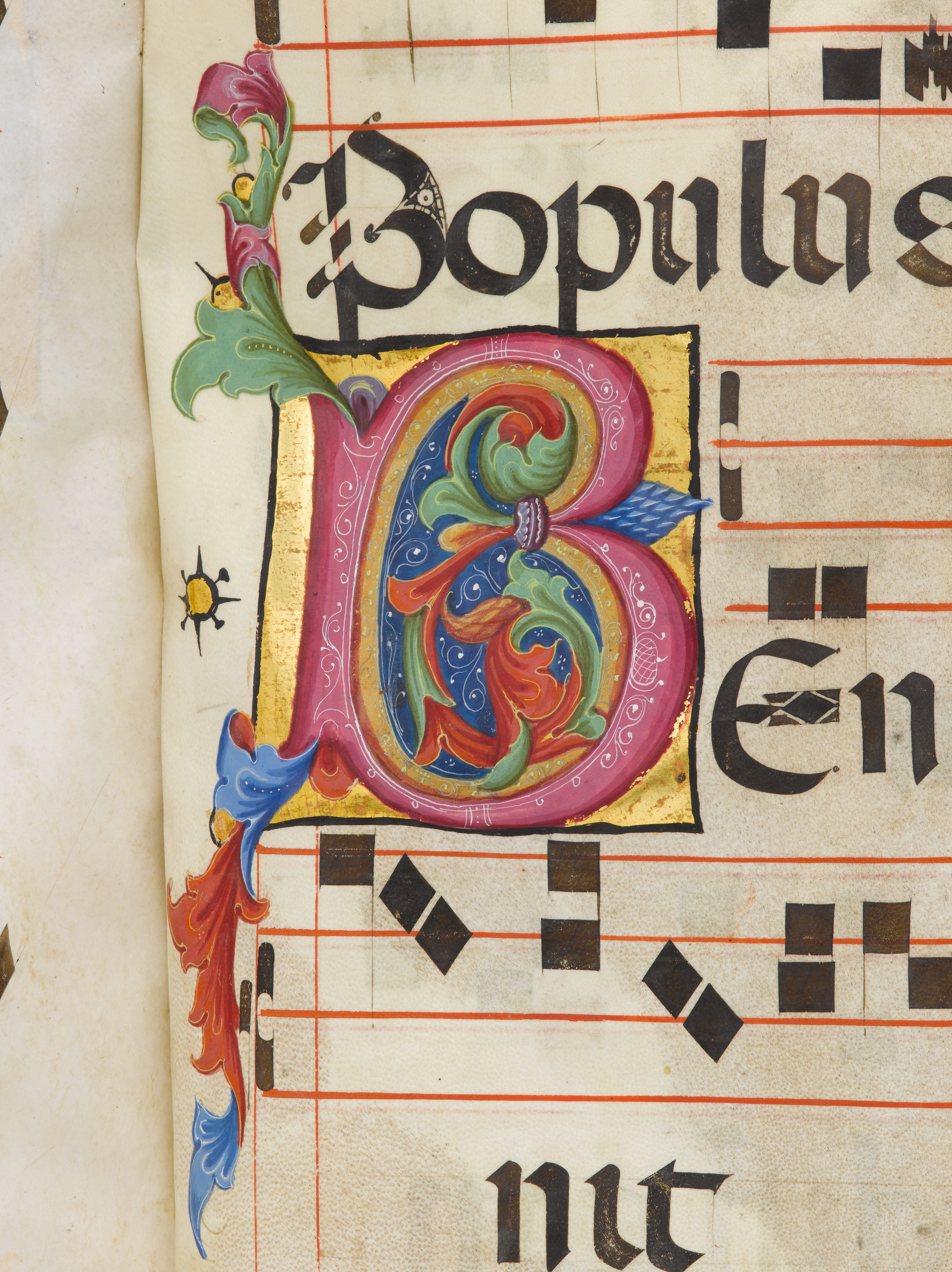

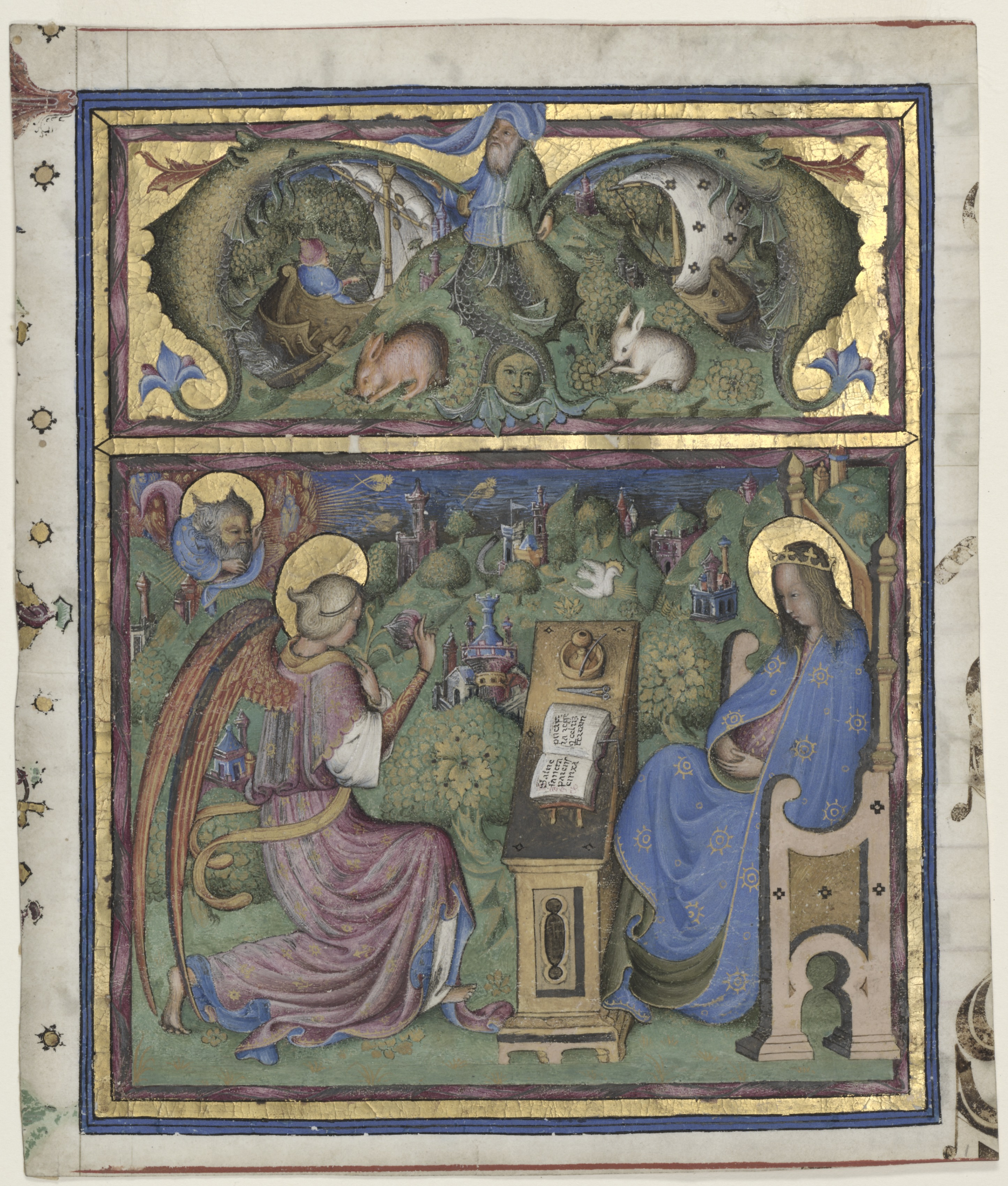

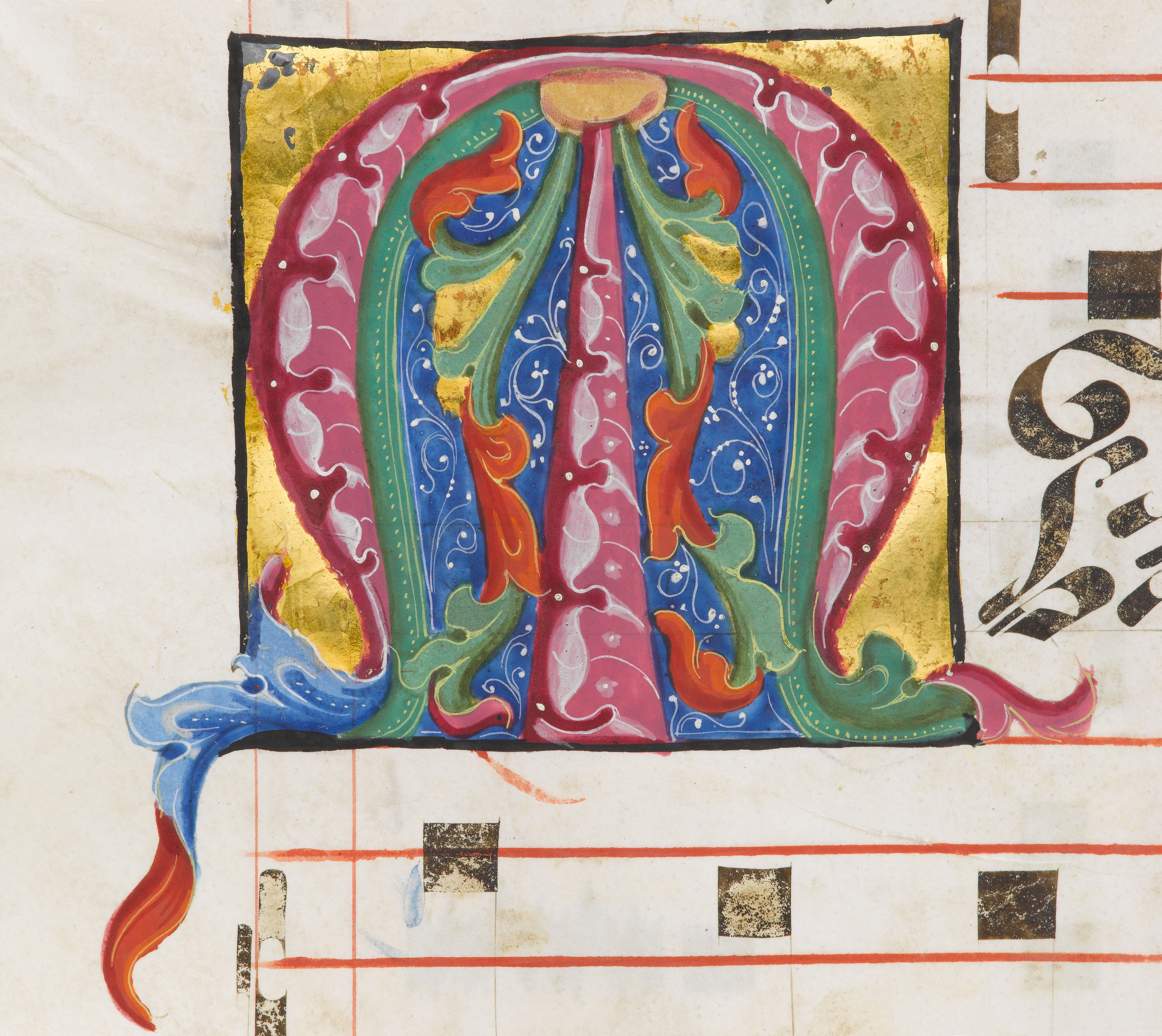

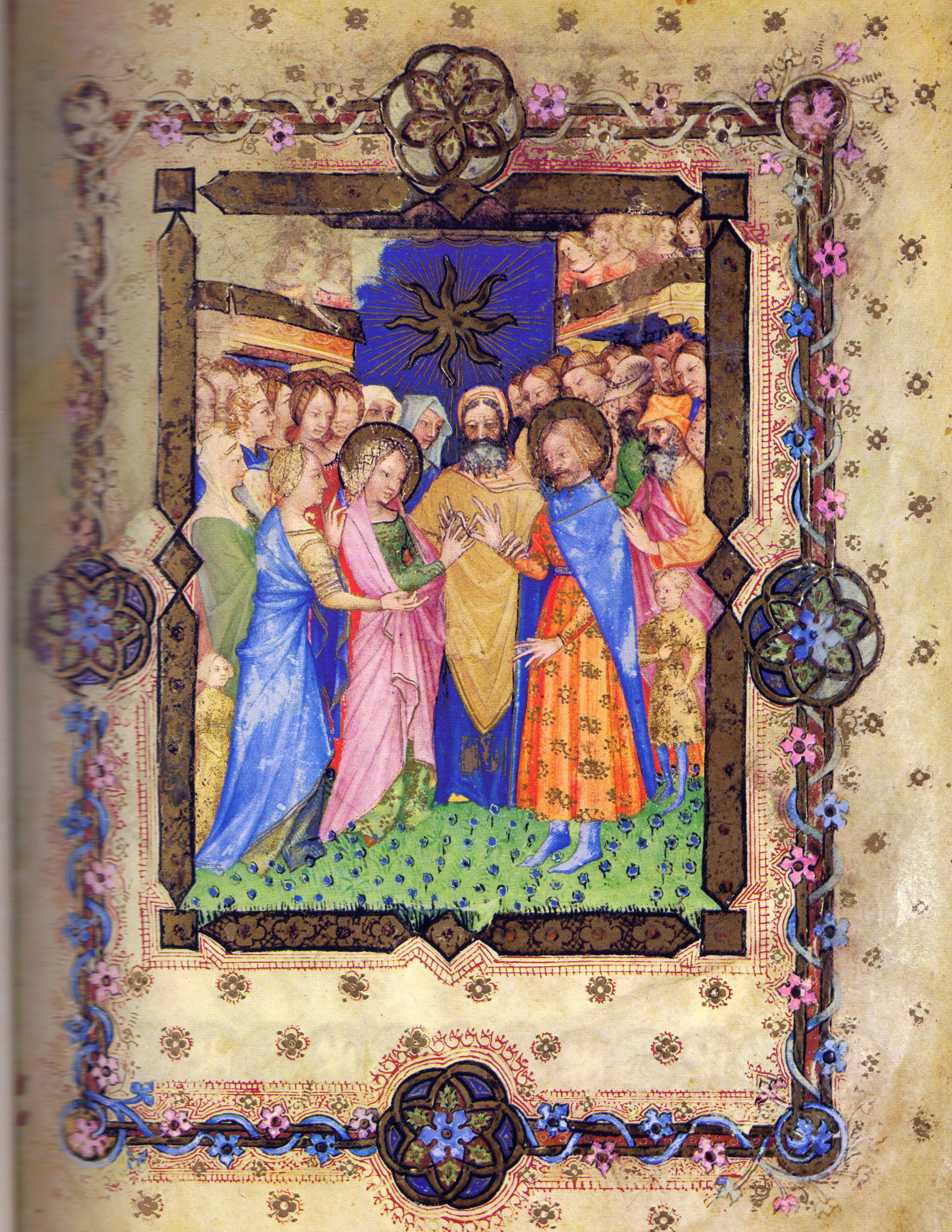
