= Georginio =

Georginio is a given name, a cognate of Giorgio. Notable people with the name include:

- Georginio Rutter (born 2002), French footballer
- Georginio Wijnaldum (born 1990), Dutch footballer
