= Gosio =

Gosio (pronounced [ˈɡɔːzjo]) is an Italian surname from Brescia and Piedmont. Notable people with the name include:

- Agustín Gosio (born 1983) Argentine rugby union player
- Bartolomeo Gosio (1863–1944), Italian medical scientist

== See also ==
- Gosio gas, discovered by Bartolomeo Gosio
- Goggio
