= Gogi =

Gogi may refer to:

- Gurpreet Gogi (1967–2025), Indian politician
- Gogigui (also known as Korean barbecue), a popular method in Korean cuisine of grilling meat
- Hwandan Gogi, a compilation of texts on ancient Korean history
- Gogi, a comic-strip and character by Pakistani cartoonist Nigar Nazar

== People with the given name ==
- Gogi Alauddin (born 1950), Pakistani former squash player
- Gogi Grant (1924–2016), American singer
- Gogi Koguashvili (born 1974), Georgian-Russian former Greco-Roman wrestler and 1992 Olympic bronze medalist
- Gogi Saroj Pal (1945–2024), Indian artist and painter
- Gogi Topadze (1940–2025), Georgian politician and scientist

== See also ==
- Goga (disambiguation)
