= Pacchioni =

Pacchioni is a surname of Italian origin. People with that name include:

- Antonio Pacchioni (1665-1726), Italian scientist and anatomist
- Antonio Maria Pacchioni (1654-1738), Italian composer
- Giorgio Pacchioni (born 1947), Italian performer, professor, and composer
- Italo Pacchioni (1872-1940), Italian inventor, photographer and filmmaker
