= 1849 Maltese general election =

- 16–20 August 1849

General elections were held in Malta between 16 and 20 August 1849, the first in the country's history.

== Background ==
In 1835, Malta was granted a Government Council by the British authorities. It consisted of the Governor, four officials and three members appointed by the governor. In June 1849 Governor Richard More O'Ferrall passed a new constitution that increased the Council to 18 members, of which ten would be appointed and eight elected.

== Results ==
A total of 3,767 people were registered to vote, of which 3,315 cast votes, giving a turnout of 88%.

Elected members
Name	Votes	Notes
Don Filippo Amato	619	
Annetto Casolani	606	
Adriano Dingli	117	Elected from Gozo
Leopoldo Fiteni	512	
Montebello Pulis	716	
Arcangelo Pullicino	511	
Mikelang Scerri	607	
Giovanni Battista Vella	425	
Source: Schiavone, p175
