= Nigar Nazar =

Pakistani cartoonist (born 1953)

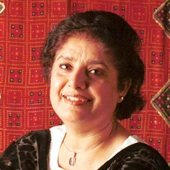
- Nigar Nazar
- Born: 1953 (age 72–73); Karachi, Pakistan
- Known for: Cartoonist
- Notable work: Gogi (cartoon)
- Website: www.gogistudios.com

Nigar Nazar (Urdu: نگار نذر; born 1953) is a Pakistani cartoonist. Her best-known character, Gogi, is an urban Pakistani woman struggling with her frailties in the context of sexist social norms. The character was created to educate people about social and educational advocacy problems. She is the chief executive officer of Gogi Studios.

== Biography ==
Nigar switched from a medical degree to a degree in fine arts in 1968. She graduated in fine arts from the University of the Punjab, Lahore. She also attended courses at the Australian National University, Canberra.

In 1970, her cartoon Gogi appeared for the first time in Karachi's Institute of Arts and Crafts annual magazine.

In 2002–2003, she was a Fulbright scholar at the art department of the University of Oregon, and in 2009, she was a Fulbright Visiting Specialist at Colorado College. She attended a UNICEF-sponsored training session on animated film at Hanna-Barbera Studios in Manila.

Gogi Studios works on projects that actively address social issues. In 2009, Nazar completed five "awareness comics on burning social issues such as extremism, corruption, sectarian violence, girl’s education, and women’s rights". Three compilations of her cartoons have been published, as well as several calendars, brochures, diaries, and posters. She has produced three children's books for various international NGOs on health and hygiene, the environment, disaster management, first aid, and child safety.

Now living in Islamabad, Nazar says, "My work ... started from newspaper and reached the community, as it appeared on public buses and hospitals. I published books and comics and the aim of my studio is to address mindset for a positive change."

She is a founding member of the Asian Youth Association for Animators and Cartoonists, headquartered in Guiyang, China. She has been an official speaker and jury member of numerous art and cartoon competitions, both national and international, such as the APACA (AYAAC), Aydin Dogan Vakfi (Turkey), Himal Cartoon Conference (Nepal), Cartoonists Congress (Malaysia/Singapore), and the Oxfam Congress for Women's Issues (Sri Lanka). Nazar has conducted many workshops and outreach programs for underprivileged students in Pakistan.

=== Gogi ===
Nazar's main cartoon character, Gogi, has been a popular comicstrip in newspapers worldwide. Gogi depicts a modern Pakistani Muslim woman with short hair, long eyelashes and a polka dot dress. Asked in an interview to describe Gogi, Nazar said, "In the words of a university student who has done a well-researched thesis on my work, 'Gogi is the symbol of womanhood in Pakistan, with all her adventures and escapades in daily life, facing day to day hypocrisies in a male dominated society". The Denver Post described Gogi as "a bit like 'Blondie' and a bit like Oprah—except devoutly Muslim".

In 2004, in collaboration with non-governmental organisations, 12 public-transport buses were wrapped with Gogi cartoons to convey social messages.

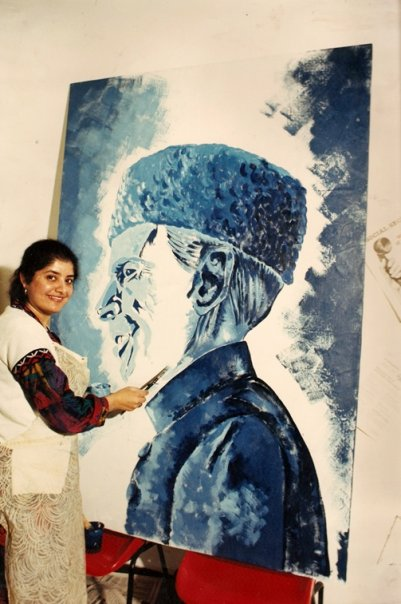
Nazar painting the portrait Father of the nation, Quaid-e-Azam on National Day celebrations for the Pakistan Embassy in England, 1986. That painting is still present in the Pakistan consulate, Bradford

== Honours ==
Nigar was featured in the Wateen Telecom Pakistan "Icon 2010 of Pakistan" calendar. The Cartoonists Rights Network named her first among innovative users of cartoons. She received the Mohtarma Fatima Jinnah Award from the government of Pakistan. She received the Booruker UNESCO prize in 1997 for her work at an orphanage in Kyrgyzstan. The BBC nominated her as one of a hundred influential women who brought about a difference in the world.

In 2023, she was awarded Tamgha-i-Imtiaz by the President of Pakistan.

On October 18, 2026, Nigar was awarded "Women of Substance Award" by Glam Street in the 2026 Annual Glam Street x Hunar Women Awards for her contributions and impact on the society.

== Projects ==
Trauma counselling of earthquake victims through puppets
Nigar devised Puppet Shows weaving elements of Trauma Counseling in the script for Earthquake victims (October 2005) Gogi comic strip characters entertained and conducted Trauma Counselling in an innovative and impactful way.
Outreach Programs and lectures (January 2008 – December 2009)
Nazar conducted outreach programs in Islamabad, Rawalpindi and Lahore on environmental subjects. She showed animated cartoons, demonstrated the art of drawing cartoons, interacted with children, and distributed free Gogi books and stationery in Gogi school bags to the attendees.
Workshops (2008–2010)
Nazar conducted numerous cartooning workshops for children, especially those from disadvantaged communities, with the international non-governmental organisations PLAN, HEC (Higher Education Commission), National Government/CARE and Shaj-re-Ilm. Workshops were also organised with private organisations, such as KFC, for children.

Cartooning workshop were conducted by Nigar Nazar for Karachi University, NUST and Gymkhana Lahore. Courses in drawing and cartooning were conducted in Fatimah Jinnah University.

== Publications ==
- Glad to Meetcha Gogi, Adam Publishers (Malta), 1975.
- Gogi on the Go, Pak-American Publishers, 1982.
- Koorey ka Jin (English: The Garbage Monster), including a board game, 2005.
- Prepared training modules for HIV/AIDS, for Pakistan's health ministry, 1987.
- Designed and authored a baby-record book published by Ferozsons Laboratories in 2006.
- Prepared and illustrated two books on disaster management in 2006 (a JICA project).
- Collection of comic strips Going Gogi published in 2009; later translated to Urdu.
- January 2010: produced five comic books on life skills: girls' education, corruption, anti-recruitment, women's rights, and sectarian violence.
- Babloo: The Little Boy who didn't like Books! (2014) ISBN 0199065845
