= Giorgio Sonnino =

Italian politician

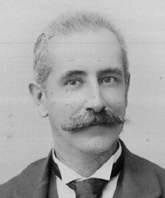

Giorgio Sonnino (17 February 1844 – 29 November 1921) was a senator of the Kingdom of Italy. He was born in Alexandria, Egypt, and died in Rome. He was a Jew, but converted to Anglicanism, the faith of his Welsh wife.
