= Toesca =

Toesca is a surname. Notable people with the surname include:

- Giovanni Pietro Toesca (1877-1962), Italian academic and art historian
- Gioacchino Toesca e Ricci, a.k.a. Joaquín Toesca (1745–1799), Italian architect active in Chile
