= Trèves =

Trèves may refer to:

- The French name of the city of Trier, in Germany
- François Trèves (born 1930), a French-American mathematician

== France ==
Trèves is the name or part of the name of several communes in France:

- Trèves, Gard, in the Gard department
- Trèves, Rhône, in the Rhône department
- Trèves, former commune of the Maine-et-Loire department, now part of Chênehutte-Trèves-Cunault
- Chênehutte-Trèves-Cunault, in the Maine-et-Loire department
- Saint-Laurent-de-Trèves, in the Lozère department
