= Moukaila Goga =

Togolese footballer (born 1987)

Personal information
- Date of birth: 4 May 1987 (age 39)
- Place of birth: Lomé, Togo
- Height: 1.70 m (5 ft 7 in)
- Position: Striker

Team information
- Current team: CS Louhans-Cuiseaux
- Number: 31

Youth career
- 2004–2006: Planète Foot

Senior career*
Years	Team	Apps	(Gls)
2006–	CS Louhans-Cuiseaux	51	(2)

International career
2010	Togo	1	(0)
- * Club domestic league appearances and goals

Moukaila Goga (born 4 May 1987) is a Togolese footballer. He plays as a striker for CS Louhans-Cuiseaux in the France Championnat de France amateur.

== Career ==
Goga began his career with Planète Foot. He joined 2006 to French based club CS Louhans-Cuiseaux.

He earned on 23 May 2010 his first call-up for the Togo national team and made his debut in the Corsica Cup against Gabon.
