= Biagio Goggio =

Italian footballer (1892-1915)

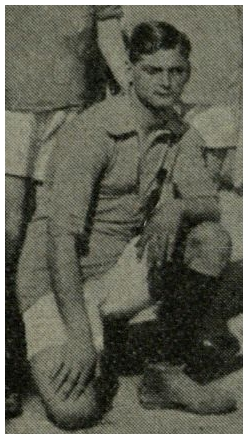

Personal information
- Full name: Biagio Goggio
- Date of birth: 1 January 1892
- Place of birth: Ivrea, Italy
- Date of death: 28 July 1915 (aged 23)
- Place of death: Monfalcone, Italy
- Position: Midfielder

Senior career*
Years	Team	Apps	(Gls)
19??–1911	Ivrea	?	(?)
1911–1914	Torino	22	(4)
1914–1915	Juventus	9	(1)

International career
1914	Italy	1	(0)
- * Club domestic league appearances and goals

Biagio Goggio (Italian pronunciation: [ˈbjaːdʒo ˈɡɔddʒo]; 1 January 1892 – 28 July 1915) was an Italian footballer who played as a midfielder. On 29 March 1914, he represented the Italy national football team on the occasion of a friendly match against France in a 2–0 home win.
