= Giorgio Mitrovich =

Maltese politician (1795–1885)

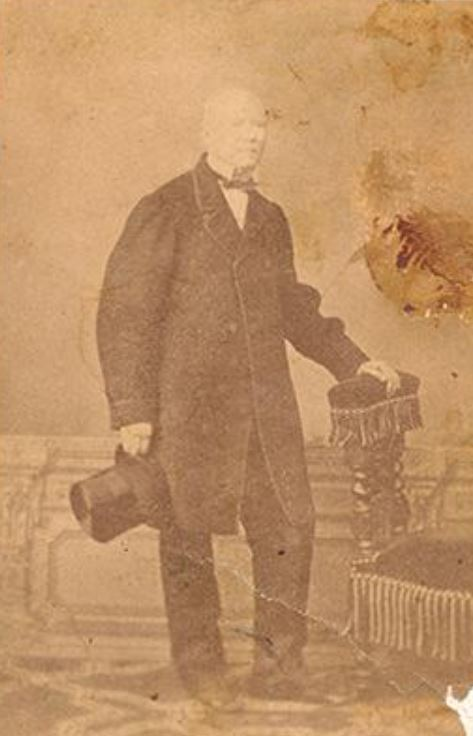
- Only known photograph of Maltese patriot Giorgio Mitrovich, shot by photographer Leandro Preziosi shortly before his death in 1885
- Born: 27 August 1795; Senglea, Hospitaller Malta
- Died: 13 March 1885 (aged 89); Valletta, Crown Colony of Malta
- Resting place: Addolorata Cemetery, Paola
- Parents: Saverio Mitrovich (father); Adeodata Boldoni (mother)

Giorgio Mitrovich (27 August 1795 – 13 March 1885) was a Maltese patriot and politician known for his role in the struggle for freedom of the press in Malta. He was one of the founders of the Comitato Generale Maltese, and he co-authored a petition in 1832 which led to a new constitution in 1835. He travelled to London multiple times to increase awareness of Maltese grievances, and his 1835 visit resulted in a Royal Commission recommending the abolition of press censorship, which was implemented in 1839. He was briefly elected to the Council of Government in the 1850s.

== Early life ==
Mitrovich was born on 27 August 1795 in Senglea, and he was baptised a day later by Canon Don Salvatore Bonnici. His parents were Saverio Mitrovich and Adeodata née Boldoni. His paternal grandfather, who was also called Giorgio Mitrovich, was originally from Kotor, then under Venetian rule. He had arrived in Malta in the 1770s and became a successful privateer during the final years when corsairing against Muslim ships was legal.

During Mitrovich's childhood, Malta underwent a turbulent period of political change. Centuries-long Hospitaller rule ended with a French invasion in 1798, and the subsequent French occupation resulted in an uprising and blockade. Malta became a British protectorate in 1800 and a colony in 1813.

Mitrovich had connections with a number of English families at a young age, since his father was in the Royal Malta Fencible Regiment. He worked as a clerk at two English commercial houses and then established his own business, but this venture was not successful.

== Struggle for press freedom ==
During the early years of British rule, there was no freedom of the press and it was difficult for the Maltese to express their views or participate in the islands' administration or finances. The Commissariat Department and the Church Missionary Society were the only licensed printing presses, and the only newspaper was the weekly Malta Government Gazette. Mitrovich fought for press freedom and the right for the Maltese to express themselves, although he did not desire independence, and he respected and admired the British.

Mitrovich was a co-founder of the Comitato Generale Maltese, a body which included elected deputies representing Maltese from different professions, along with the clergy and nobility. The committee was led by Camillo Sceberras. In 1832, Mitrovich and four other members of the committee made a petition known as the 1832 Memorial demanding administrative reforms. The petition asked for the establishment of a Consiglio Popolare, which was to be a legislative national council consisting of around 30 people to be elected by the Maltese upper classes.

King William IV granted a new constitution to Malta in 1835, which established a Council of Seven to assist the government, although the Governor still held final authority. The Maltese liberals were unsatisfied at this move, and in July 1835 Mitrovich went to London in an attempt to increase awareness of the Maltese cause among British politicians. There he published a pamphlet entitled The claims of the Maltese founded upon the principles of Justice, in which he listed the rights and grievances of the Maltese people, including accusations that Englishmen were taking jobs from the Maltese and were receiving high salaries, while the Maltese lived in poverty. In the text, he wrote the following about the administration of Malta:

The present Lieutenant Governor, Sir Frederick Cavendish Ponsonby, is an excellent man, but he is surrounded by persons interested in maintaining and perpetuating the present unpopular system. His disposition, I have no doubt, is good, but he is placed in a very difficult position.

Mitrovich also wrote a message entitled Indirizzo ai Maltesi da parte del loro amico Giorgio Mitrovich attualmente a Londra on 20 November 1835, and copies of the printed message were sent to Malta and distributed on the island. The text read:

The English nation was surprised to hear from me about the misery, suffering and repression under which our beloved country is groaning. Many famous people of high standing in this metropolis and other places in England are moved by sentiments of justice and generosity towards the Maltese and have agreed to support in a valid manner our representations in the House of Commons, an august assembly of the fathers of the country, and be sure that we shall be heard.

Mitorvich established contact with the Member of Parliament William Ewart, who helped him to correspond with Secretary of State Lord Glenelg and who went on to promote Maltese interests among other MPs. Ewart presented a petition signed by 2,359 Maltese people to Parliament on 11 June 1836.

Mitrovich's efforts to increase awareness were successful, and the British decided to send a Royal Commission to Malta to inquire about the islands' administration. The Commission arrived in 1836 and stayed in Malta for two years. Its recommendations included the abolition of press censorship, and the government passed an ordinance in this regard on 14 March 1839.

He visited London a number of other times, including between 1838 and 1840, with the aim of preserving the privileges which had been gained. Mitrovich's travels to Britain must have cost him a significant amount of money, and he is believed to have spent most of his savings on these travels, although he might have received some financial support from other Maltese liberals.

== Political career, later life and death ==
Malta's first election was the 1849 general election, which was held after a new constitution was established, replacing the previous one from 1835. Mitrovich contested the election, but he only received 26 out of 3,056 votes. However, he later managed to obtain a seat in the Council of Government following the resignation of Sir Ignatio Bonavita in April 1855. Mitrovich won a by-election with 1,050 votes and became a member of the council on 5 June 1855. He resigned around a year later, in protest over a resolution moved by Giancomo Pantaleone Bruno.

Mitrovich continued to play a role in the Maltese struggle for constitutional rights, and he sent a petition to the Secretary of State for the Colonies in 1858, attempting to reform the council by forming a national committee. This move was short-lived.

Mitrovich lived in poverty during his later years, and he had a family of twelve. He died on 13 March 1885 in his house at No. 69, Strada Teatro, Valletta. His funeral was held three days later, and he was buried at the Addolorata Cemetery in Paola.

== Legacy ==
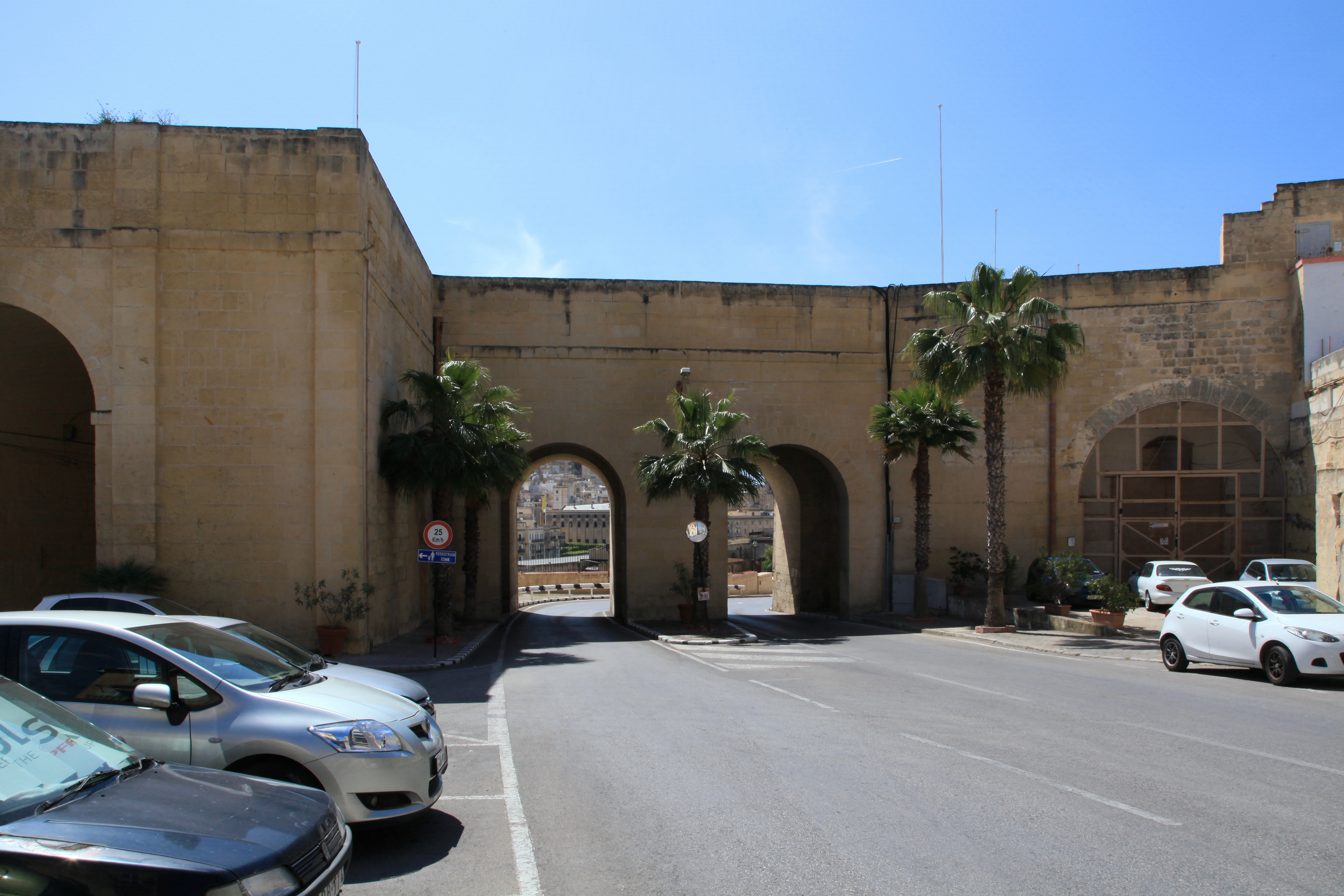
The square behind Senglea's main gate is now called Pjazzetta Ġorġ Mitrovich

Mitrovich has been acclaimed as a patriot who made efforts to improve the lives of the Maltese people. However, some interpreted his actions as being more motivated by self-interest or that he was a political agent. Regardless of his motivations, his work helped pave the way for future reforms.

Mitrovich is not very well known in Malta, and he is sometimes said to have been "forgotten". There are no monuments commemorating him, and his grave is in a dilapidated state. However, his death centenary in 1985 was marked with the issue of a postage stamp, and a square in Senglea and a number of streets in other localities are named after him.

Some of Mitrovich's descendants now live in South Africa, and are known by the surname of Metrovich (how several branches of the family used to be called also while in Malta). In 2018, two of his great-great-grandchildren donated his only known photograph to the National Archives of Malta. The photograph was taken by photographer Leandro Preziosi shortly before Mitrovich's death.
