= Giorgio Treves de'Bonfili =

Italian footballer

Silvio Appiani
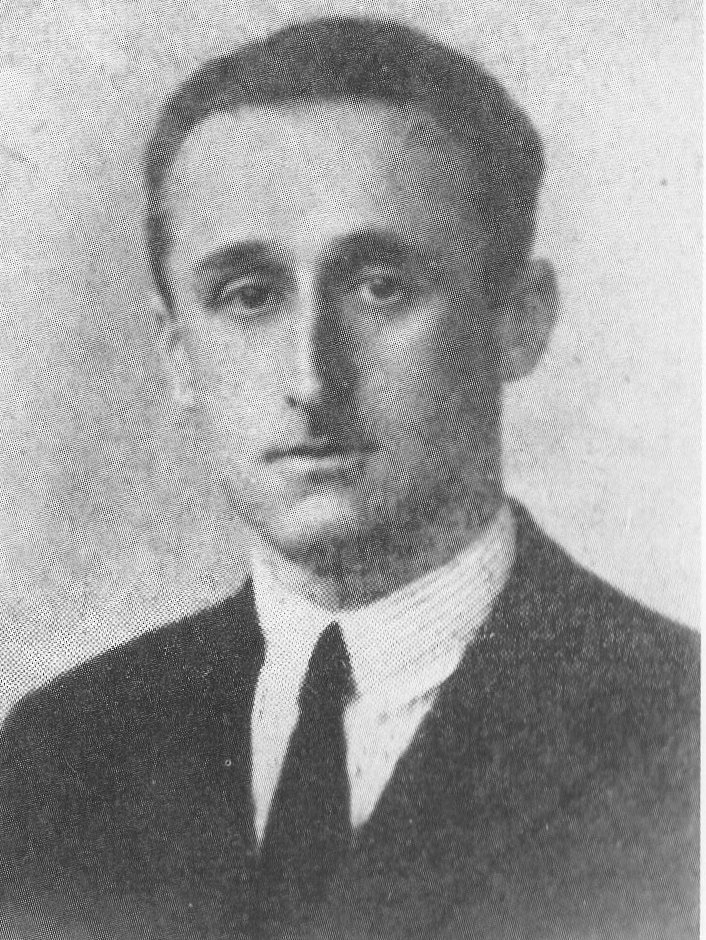

Personal information
- Date of birth: 5 April 1884
- Place of birth: Padua, Italy
- Date of death: 24 July 1964 (aged 80)
- Place of death: Borgo Valsugana, Italy
- Position: Forward

Senior career*
Years	Team	Apps	(Gls)
1910–1911	Padova	3	(0)
- * Club domestic league appearances and goals

Giorgio Treves de' Bonfili (4 April 1884 – 24 July 1964) was an Italian football forward.

He was the first president and one of the founders of Calcio Padova.

== Career ==
On 29 January 1910, along with 50 members, Giorgio Treves de' Bonfili helped to found the Associazione Calcio Padova. After the approval of the statute, he was appointed the first president of the Biancoscudati squad at just 25 years old. He was the organizer of the first friendly match against Hellas Verona on 20 February that year. Under his leadership, Padova played two games total in the Campionato Regionale del Veneto (Veneto Regional Championship) against Vicenza and two exhibition games in the Coppa Esposizione, finishing second against Milan and Vicenza.

He was an engineering graduate and held the noble title of baron.
