= Giorgio Pacchioni =

Italian composer

Giorgio Pacchioni (born 16 July 1947) is an Italian performer, professor, and composer.

== Life ==
He has held the chair of recorder at the Conservatorio Giovanni Battista Martini in Bologna (Italy) from 1977 to 2006, when he retired and moved to Ubatuba (Brazil). Pacchioni is a musicologist specializing in the revival of Baroque composition in the modern era, and has gained a following over the Internet for his Neo-Baroque compositions and fugues.

Giorgio Pacchioni has promoted the music of Francesco Antonio Vallotti through both his performances and compositions.

He actively collaborated with the musical association “Antiqua” on the transcription of Girolamo Dalla Casa's Secondo libro de Madrigali a cinque voci con i passaggi (Venice 1590): in fact, he recomposed the whole Tenore partbook, which is missing from the only extant copy of the original print. The CD based on this opus, performed by "Il terzo suono" conducted by G.P.Fagotto, has won the “Speciale raccomandazione della giuria del premio discografico internazionale A.Vivaldi”.

Pacchioni is also a well known ocarina maker.

== Works ==
=== Works published by Ut Orpheus Edizioni ===
28 Preludi per Flauto Dolce solo in forma di progressione musicale
8 Preludi (Studi) in forma di progressione melodica dalle «Sonate a Flauto solo» di Paolo Benedetto Bellinzani (Venezia 1720) per Flauto Dolce Contralto
9 Preludi (Studi) in forma di progressione melodica dai «XII Solos» di Francesco Mancini (London 1724) per Flauto Dolce Contralto
Baroquefantasy n. 1 (1996) per Clarinetto e Pianoforte
Baroquefantasy n. 2 (1996) per Viola e Pianoforte
Duo didattici in forma di progressione musicale estrapolati da diversi autori e atti a superare velocemente e con sicurezza le difficoltà della letteratura musicale Rinascimentale e Barocca. Vol. I: per 2 Flauti Dolci S[A]-T (Violino e Violoncello)
Duo didattici in forma di progressione musicale estrapolati da diversi autori e atti a superare velocemente e con sicurezza le difficoltà della letteratura musicale Rinascimentale e Barocca. Vol. II: per 2 Flauti Dolci S-A (Violino e Viola)
Il Canone alla cartella e alla mente senza Tenor. Studio sistematico dell’imitazione canonica attraverso i documenti di L. Zacconi, O. Tigrini e G. B. Martini
Il Canone alla cartella e alla mente sopra un Tenor. Studio sistematico dell’imitazione canonica da 3 a 8 voci sopra un canto fermo attraverso i documenti di L. Zacconi, F. Soriano e R. Rodio
Manuale di Diminuzione elaborato dalle opere di A. Corelli e G. Ph. Telemann per Flauto Dolce Contralto (Violino, Flauto Traverso, Viola da Gamba)
Manuale di Diminuzione elaborato dalle opere di Jacob Van Eyck per Flauto Dolce (Violino, Flauto Traverso, Viola da Gamba)
Passi strumentali in forma di progressione melodica da «Il Dolcimelo» di Aurelio Virgiliano (ca.1600) per Violino o Flauto Dolce in Sol
Passi strumentali in forma di progressione melodica da «Selva de’ varii Passaggi» di Francesco Rognoni (Milano 1620) per Violino o Flauto Dolce in Do e in Sol
Selva di Vari Precetti. La pratica musicale tra i secoli XVI e XVIII nelle fonti dell’epoca
Varie Partite sopra Bassi ostinati per 1, 2, 3 Flauti Dolci e Basso Continuo con una raccolta di Bassi ostinati dei secoli XVII e XVIII
