= De Giorgi =

De Giorgi is a surname of Italian origin.

== People with the surname ==
- Carlos De Giorgi (born 1984), Argentine professional footballer
- Cosimo De Giorgi (1842–1922), Italian scientist
- Elsa De Giorgi (1914–1997), Italian film actress and writer
- Ennio De Giorgi (1928–1996), Italian mathematician
- Ferdinando De Giorgi (born 1961), Italian professional volleyball coach and former player
- Gino de Giorgi (1914–1979), Italian admiral
- Giordano De Giorgi (1919–1996), Italian wrestler.
- Giuseppe de Giorgi (born 1953), Italian admiral and naval aviator
- Rosalba De Giorgi (born 1970), Italian politician and journalist
- Salvatore De Giorgi (born 1930), Italian prelate of the Catholic Church

== See also ==
- Rocca de' Giorgi, commune in Lombardy, Italy
- Villa De Giorgi
- Di Giorgi (surname)
- Di Giorgio
- Giorgi (surname)
- Giorgis
