= Zorzi (surname) =

Zorzi is an Italian surname. Notable people with the surname include:

== 13–17th century ==
- Bertolome Zorzi (fl. 1266–1273), Venetian nobleman, merchant, and troubadour
- Marino Zorzi (1231–1312), 50th doge of the Republic of Venice
- Chiara Zorzi or Giorgio, also Clara or Claire (died 1454), was duchess consort of Athens by marriage to Nerio II Acciaioli
- Nicholas I Zorzi (or Giorgi) (died 1345), Marquess of Bodonitsa
- Jacob Zorzi (also Giacomo Giorgi), the Marquess of Bodonitsa from 1388 to 1410
- Nicholas II Zorzi, Margrave of Bodonitsa, from 1410 to 1414
- Marino Zorzi (bishop of Brescia) (died 1631), Roman Catholic Bishop of Brescia (1596–1631) and Apostolic Nuncio to Florence
- Marino Giovanni Zorzi (died 1678), Roman Catholic Bishop of Brescia
- Zorzi Ventura, Italian mannerist painter of the Venetian school, active mainly in Venice, Istria and Dalmatia

== 20–21st century ==
- Alvise Zorzi (1922–2016), Italian journalist and writer from Venice
- Andrea Zorzi (born 1965), former Italian volleyball player who won two World Championships
- Angelo Zorzi (1890–1974), Italian gymnast
- Bruno Zorzi (1937–2026), Australian rules footballer
- Cristian Zorzi (born 1972), Italian cross country skier
- Delfo Zorzi, presently known as Roi Hagen, Italian-born Japanese citizen
- Giulio Zorzi (born 1989), South African swimmer
- Guglielmo Zorzi (1879–1967), Italian screenwriter and film director
- Juan Carlos Zorzi (1935–1999), Argentine musician, composer, and orchestra director
- Lucia Zorzi (born 1961), Italian television writer, producer and consultant
- Mario Zorzi (1910–1944), Italian sports shooter
- Renzo Zorzi (1946–2015), Italian racing driver
- Sergio Zorzi (born 1964), former Italian rugby union player and currently, coach
- Susanna Zorzi (born 1992), Italian racing cyclist
- Veronica Zorzi (born 1980), Italian professional golfer
- William F. Zorzi, journalist and screenwriter

== See also ==
- George (disambiguation)
- Giorgi (surname)
- Giorgi (disambiguation)
