= Palazzo Zorzi =

Palazzo Zorzi may refer to:

- Palazzo Zorzi Bon
- Palazzo Zorzi Galeoni

== See also ==
- Zorzi
- Zorzi (surname)
