= Treaty of Selymbria =

1411 Venetian-Ottoman treaty

The Treaty of Selymbria was an agreement concluded on 3 September 1411 between the Republic of Venice and the Ottoman prince Musa Çelebi, ruler of the European portion of the Ottoman Empire (Rumelia), at Selymbria. The treaty largely repeated previous agreements between Venice and Ottoman rulers, and recognized the possessions of the Republic in Greece and Albania.

== Background ==
Venice had been among the signatories of the Treaty of Gallipoli in 1403 with Süleyman Çelebi, ruler of the European part of the Ottoman Empire. Renewed in 1409, it ensured a period of peaceful relations between the Republic and the Ottomans, in exchange for the payment of an annual tribute by Venice. In 1410–11 however, Süleyman was defeated and overthrown by his brother, Musa Çelebi. Unlike Süleyman, Musa, who relied greatly on the akinji raiders, followed a policy extremely hostile to his Christian neighbours. The attacks against both the Byzantine Empire and Serbia, that had stopped after 1403, resumed.

Following Süleyman's defeat and death, the Venetians initially prevaricated; their payments to the Ottomans were allowed to lapse, but the bailo (permanent envoy) in the Byzantine capital, Constantinople, was ordered to contact Musa and assure him of the Republic's peaceful intentions, while Venice debated on the proper course of action. A motion to take advantage of the occasion and try to seize Gallipoli was defeated at the Venetian Senate, and finally, on 4 June 1411, the Senate appointed Giacomo Trevisan as its ambassador to Musa. While acknowledging that due to ongoing developments he should exercise his own judgment as needed, the Senate provided Trevisan with detailed instructions—according to historian Dimitris Kastritsis, "a rare glimpse into the complex situation in Rumeli as perceived by Venice in late spring and early summer of 1411, a time about which little is otherwise known."

== Trevisan's instructions ==
Map of the southern Balkans and western Anatolia in 1410. Ottoman and Turkish territories are marked in shades of brown, Byzantine territory in pink, and Venetian and Venetian-influenced areas in green

Trevisan was instructed to repeat the customary congratulations and assurances of the Republic's good will. In order to gain Musa's favour, he was also to hint that other "princes and communities" had offered to join Venice against Musa, but that the Republic had rebuffed them, preferring to renew with Musa the good relations she had enjoyed with his predecessors. Trevisan was to ensure that any treaty included the Venetian possessions and protectorates in Greece: the cities and fortresses of Pteleos, Argos, Nauplia, Lepanto, Coron and Modon, the islands of Crete, Negroponte (Euboea), Lepanto, Tinos, and Mykonos. The peaceful and unmolested navigation in the Dardanelles and the vicinity of Tenedos (Note: Tenedos itself had been depopulated and demilitarized under the terms of the Treaty of Turin (1381) between Venice and Genoa.) was to be guaranteed, and the provision of the 1403 treaty for the cession of a strip of land five miles wide on the mainland shore across Euboea reaffirmed.

Trevisan was also to raise the issue of the city of Patras, which Venice had been leasing since 1408 from its Latin Archbishop, Stephen Zaccaria. In 1409 the Venetians had agreed to pay 500 ducats per annum for the city and its environs, but Trevisan was instructed to ensure that henceforth the tribute would be levied on the Prince of Achaea, Centurione II Zaccaria, since the city was not formally Venetian territory. If pressed, however, he was authorized to pay the sum, but demand that in future, the payment was to be arranged with the Prince of Achaea and the Latin Archbishop. In a similar manner, Venice's possessions in Albania were also to be included in the treaty. Trevisan was to stop in Dalmatia and Albania on his way east and inquire about the wider political situation: through a local notary, Venice had concluded an agreement with Pasha Yiğit Bey, ruler of Skopje, for the protection of their possessions in Albania against Balša III and other local rulers, in exchange for an annual sum of 500 ducats, but the Senate was not aware if Pasha Yiğit was still alive, or what his position in Musa's regime was. Trevisan was to ascertain the situation, acquire documents about which territories were under Venetian control at the time, and renew the agreement of protection on the same terms. A further topic of concern for the Republic was the Marquisate of Bodonitza in central Greece, which was ruled by the Venetian Zorzi family. The small principality had recently been conquered by the Ottomans, with the Marquis Jacob Zorzi being killed and his heir Nicholas II Zorzi taken captive. Trevisan was to negotiate for the release of the latter, the restitution of his domains, and his inclusion in the treaty.

With respect to the tribute owed to Musa, Trevisan was instructed that the same sums as stipulated in 1409 should be aimed for: 1,000 ducats for Albania, to be paid every August, along with 100 ducats for Lepanto, and the 500 ducats for Patras. If Musa demanded the back payment of 1,000 ducats owed to Süleyman, he should argue that as Balša had been allowed to attack the Venetian possessions in Albania in the meantime, the payment was void; but if Musa insisted, Trevisan should again concede the sum, except for 17,800 akçes subtracted for a shipment of slaves captured from the Venetian merchant Niccolò Barbo. Trevisan was also authorized to offer further sums to Musa's main lieutenants, most notably Mihaloğlu Mehmed Bey, Pasha Yiğit, and Evrenos. The money was to be spent at his own discretion following his assessment of their place at Musa's court. If the negotiations for a treaty proved successful, he was to secure written firmans from Musa to his local commanders informing them of the fact. If, on the other hand, a treaty was not possible, Trevisan should at least try to secure a truce of one year. If either failed, then he was to go to Constantinople, inform Venice of developments, and begin negotiations for a Christian league with the Byzantine emperor, Manuel II Palaiologos. Manuel had previously sent for Venice to send him envoys to discuss such affairs; consequently Trevisan was instructed to keep the original purpose of his mission east secret.

To assist in his mission, Trevisan was given copies of the previous agreements and of the letters by previous Venetian envoys, as well as letters of accreditation to Pasha Yiğit and to Musa's brother Mehmed Çelebi, in case he should have overthrown Musa by the time Trevisan arrived—a clear indication of "how complicated and uncertain the situation in Rumeli had become" by that point. He was assigned an interpreter, Francesco Gezo of Modon, and given a salary of 250 ducats for the first four months, and a monthly salary of 30 ducats after that. He was to be conveyed east on the galley of the Venetian Captain of the Gulf.

== Conclusion of the treaty ==
Already before Trevisan arrived in the area, Venice's local representatives had reached a preliminary agreement, through the mediation of a certain Pietro dei Greci ("Peter of the Greeks"). The agreement was already in effect by 7 June, and the ships captured by Musa had been returned with their crews, although the confiscated merchandise had not. Trevisan reached the Ottoman prince's camp by late July, and the final treaty was arranged on 12 August outside Constantinople, which Musa was besieging at the time. Nevertheless, due to some disagreements between the two sides, a formal ratification was delayed until 3 September, by which time Musa had moved to lay siege to Selymbria. Trevisan had also left, and the treaty was signed in his stead by the Captain of the Gulf, Pietro Loredan.

A Venetian version of the text is preserved in the Venetian archives. According to its provisions, the relations between the two powers were to be peaceful, as regulated by the previous treaties of 1403 and 1409. Venice's possessions, including its recent acquisitions in Albania, were confirmed, under the condition that the bailo at Constantinople would pay a tribute of 1,000 ducats each August. Its possession of Lepanto was also recognized, but only of the city and the immediately adjacent buildings and fields, for which 100 ducats in tribute were to be paid. For the city of Patras the tribute remained at 500 ducats, but it would be negotiated separately between Musa, and the bailo of Constantinople and the Latin Archbishop of Patras.

== Sources ==
- Kastritsis, Dimitris (2007). The Sons of Bayezid: Empire Building and Representation in the Ottoman Civil War of 1402–13. BRILL. ISBN 978-90-04-15836-8.
- Setton, Kenneth M. (1976). The Papacy and the Levant (1204–1571), Volume I: The Thirteenth and Fourteenth Centuries. Philadelphia: The American Philosophical Society. ISBN 0-87169-114-0.
