= Giorgi =

Giorgi may refer to:

- Giorgi (name), a Georgian masculine given name
- Giorgi (surname), an Italian surname
- Giorgi family, a noble family of the Republic of Venice and the Republic of Ragusa

== See also ==
- Giorgio (disambiguation)
- Di Giorgi
- George (disambiguation)
- Zorzi
