= Nicholas Zorzi =

Nicholas Zorzi may refer to:

- Nicholas Zorzi (died 1354), Marquess of Bodonitsa
- Nicholas Zorzi (died 1436), Marquess of Bodonitsa
- Nicholas II Zorzi (fl. 1410–1414), Marquess of Bodonitsa
