= LCD (disambiguation) =

LCD, or liquid-crystal display, is a display that uses the light-modulating properties of liquid crystals.

LCD or lcd may also refer to:

== Science and technology ==
- Lowest common denominator, a mathematical quantity
- Lacida, a cryptograph
- Lattice corneal dystrophy
- Liquor carbonis detergens, medical coal tar

== Music ==
- LCD (music act), a performance group
- Loudest Common Denominator, an album by Drowning Pool

== Other uses ==
- Lesotho Congress for Democracy, a political party
- Lord Chancellor's Department, an historical United Kingdom government department
- Low-carbohydrate diet, a food regimen
- Local coverage determination, as opposed to national coverage determination in medical insurance
- Lori Chavez-DeRemer, the United States Secretary of Labor
- Lola language (ISO 639-3 code: lcd)
- Lechang East railway station (China Railway code: LCD)

== See also ==
- LCD Soundsystem, an American rock band
