= ILQ =

ILQ may refer to:

- The airport-code of the Ilo Airport in Peru.
- The abbreviation for InLine Qualified, a brand of bearings used in inline-skates.
- ILQ is an acronym for I Love Qatar.
- Lechang East railway station, China Railway telegraph code ILQ
