= White Rose Food Division =

Food wholesaler and distributor

- Company type: Division
- Founded: 1886; 139 years ago
- Defunct: 2014
- Fate: Sold assets at bankruptcy to C&S Wholesale Grocers, Inc.
- Area served: New York metropolitan area; Philadelphia
- Parent: DiGiorgio Corporation

White Rose Food Division (est. 1886) of DiGiorgio Corporation was the largest independent food wholesaler and distributor in the New York metropolitan area. It was mainly distributed at member supermarkets of the cool buying and marketing Co-operative Associated Supermarkets including Met Foods and Pioneer and had a large presence in the supermarket Western Beef. White Rose food could also be found in Thriftway/Shop'n'Bag stores in the Philadelphia metropolitan region.

White Rose utilized power from KDC Solar and had the second-largest rooftop solar panel in Carteret, New Jersey.

In 2014, White Rose filed for bankruptcy and sold its assets to C&S Wholesale Grocers, Inc.
