= Ponte del Paradiso =

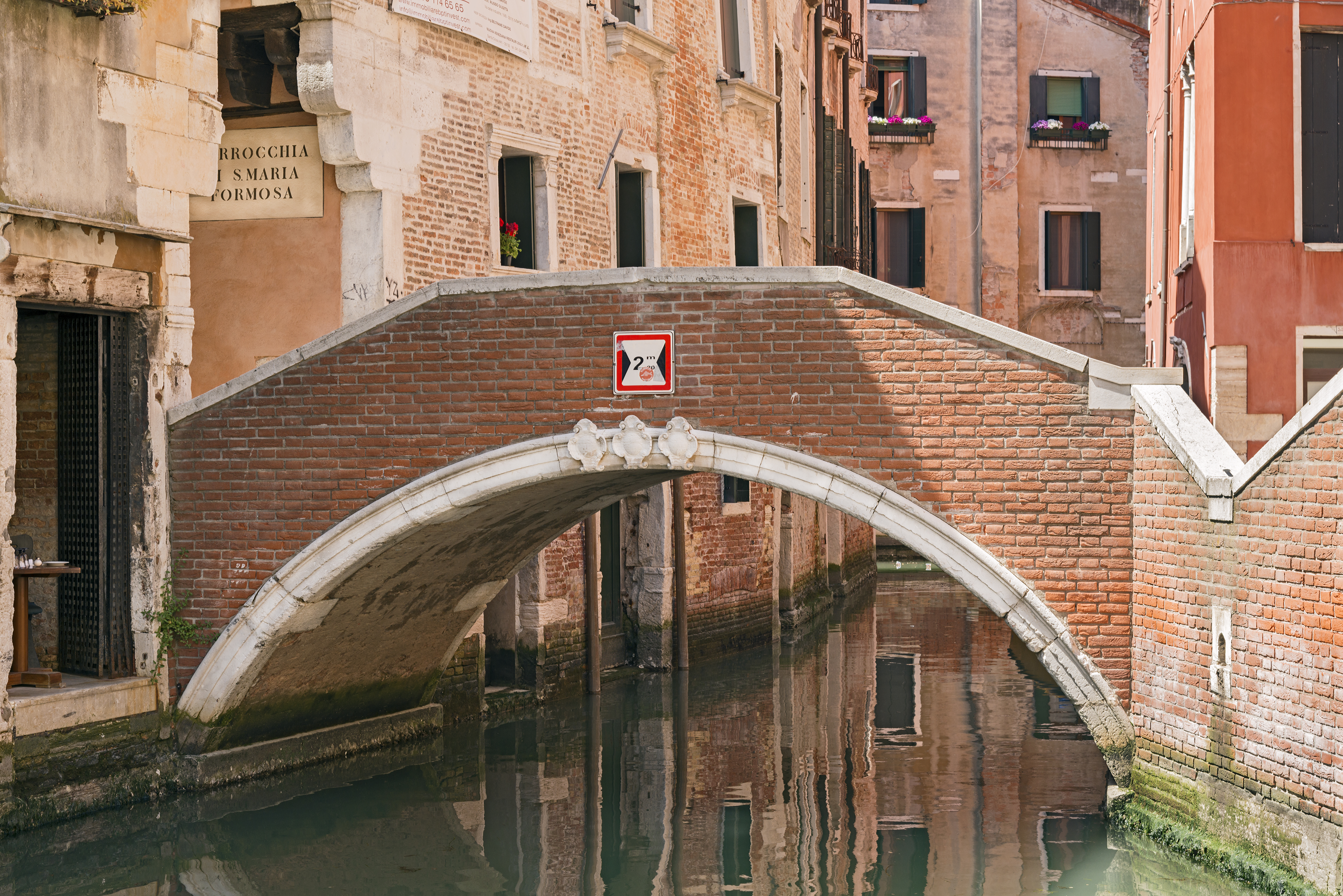
- Coordinates: 45°26′15″N 12°20′24″E
- Locale: Venice

Characteristics
- Total length: 5.45m
- Width: 3.6m
- Height: 2.17m

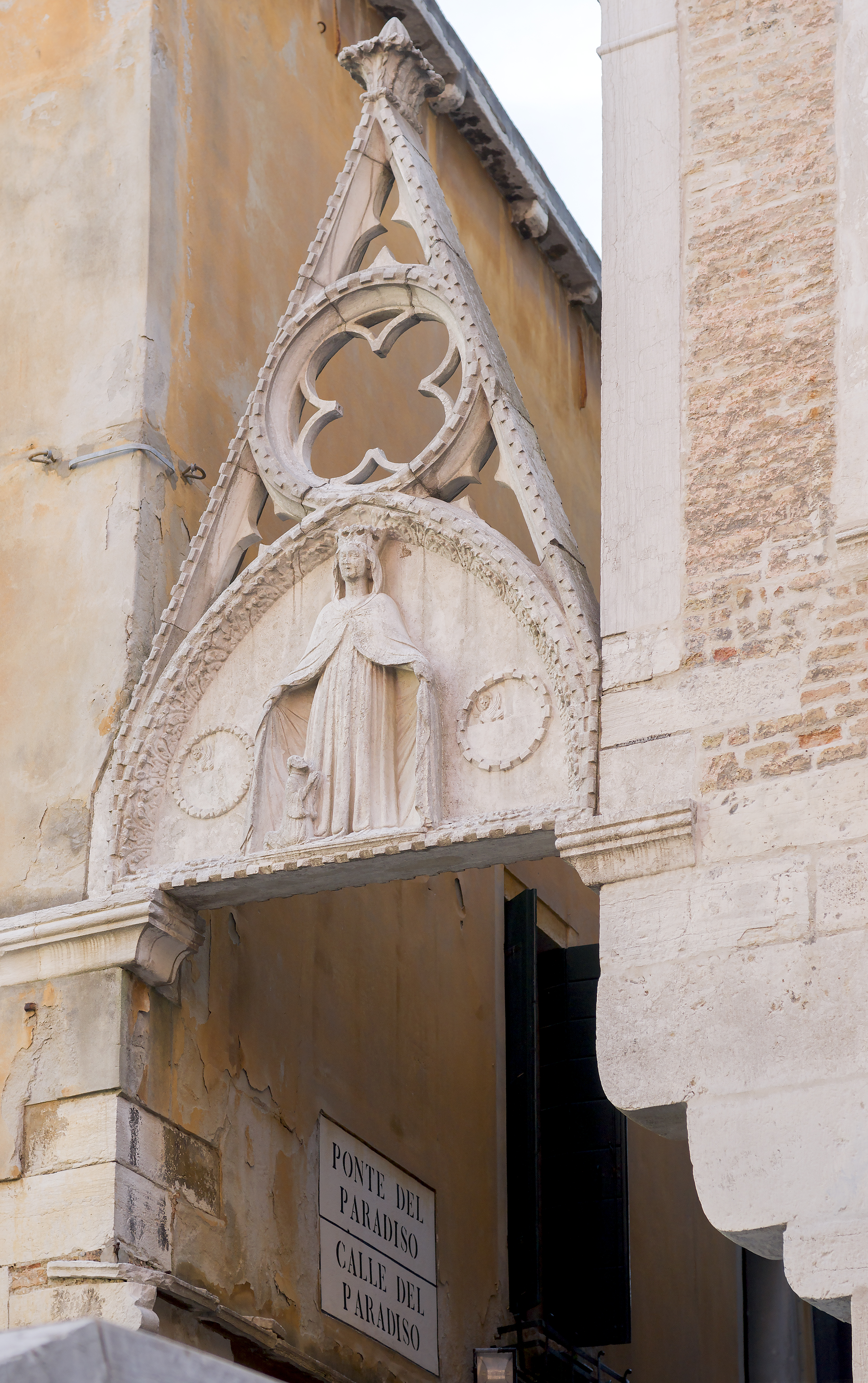
The Arco del Paradiso as seen from the canal

The Ponte del Paradiso is a bridge located in Venice, Italy. Crossing the Rio del Mondo Novo, the bridge is almost entirely constructed out of Istrian stone bricks while the steps are paved with Trachyte. It is located within Castello, the largest of the Venetian sestieres. The bridge is known for the unique arch on its southern side serving as an entrance to the Calle del Paradiso, an alley famous for its wooden overhanging eaves.

== The Name ==
According to Nuova encyclopedia Italiana: "[its] called because the patrician Paradiso family owned some houses in the area". Instead, the historian Tassini mentions the "patrician Paradiso family" but also remembers that it did not appear to own buildings in the area. Sources such as ASVE(1937), Sanudo(1970) and Bellavitis cite the birth of another rich Paradiso family in this city, now descended from Jewish converts such as Marco Paradiso and his son Francesco Paradiso (Jacob Meshulam and Saloman Meshulam).

== Arco del Paradiso ==
Above the bridge's southern doorway lies the Arco del Paradiso, also referred to as The Madonna Arch, is a carefully sculptured Gothic-style arch depicting a Madonna at whose feet rests a friar and a couple on the canal side and inward side respectively. To either side are the arms of the Mocenigo and Foscari families, likely commemorating a marriage between the two in 1491.

The arch was previously in poor condition until a restoration project led by UNESCO lasting from 1993 until 1994.
