= Associated Supermarkets =

Supermarket company

- Type: Private
- Industry: Grocery Retail
- Founded: 1954
- Headquarters: Port Washington, New York, New York, United States
- Number of locations: 250+
- Area served: Eastern United States
- Key people: Joe Garcia (Co-CEO & Co-President), Zulema Wiscovitch (Co-CEO & Co-President)
- Divisions: Associated Supermarkets, Compare Foods, Met Foods and Pioneer Supermarkets
- Website: http://shopassociated.com

Associated Foods Holdings, also referred to as Associated Food Stores, Associated Supermarkets or Associated, is the largest group of independently operated supermarkets based in the New York metropolitan area. Associated Supermarkets provide services to a network of approximately 250 independent grocery retail stores, many located in New York City.

The company also has stores on Long Island, in Upstate New York, New Jersey, Connecticut, Massachusetts, Rhode Island, North Carolina, South Carolina, Pennsylvania, and Virginia. Associated is a banner of Associated Supermarket Group (ASG). Other banners include Associated Fresh, Compare, Compare Fresh, Met Foods, Met Fresh, Metropolitan City Market, and Pioneer.

Both Associated and Compare banners are known to cater to multicultural demographics. Associated and all sister banner stores carry mainstream, ethnic, natural, and organic products and its private label Avenue A.

== History ==
In 1939, several New York City grocers came together to form a purchasing group called Queens Food Dealers. This would allow them to continue operating independently while buying their goods under one entity at lower prices from the manufacturers.

In 1954, the group became Associated Food Stores under founders Harry Laufer, Ira Gober, Sol Chalek, and others. At the time, the cooperative was made up of 18 individually owned stores.

AFS built a new warehouse and office complex at 179-45 Brinkerhoff Avenue, in Jamaica, Queens, replete with a loading dock that was served by a stretch of railroad track. They could now receive rail cars full of product and store it in their new, much larger warehouse. They decided that the butcher business within most of the stores would be concessions, but hired an expert to run the meat department of the corporation, which distributed the meat to those concessions within the membership. Soon, they were maintaining large amounts of grocery, dairy and even candling their own private label eggs.

While most of the stores were neighborhood size groceries, members began to build larger supermarkets on Long Island and other locations in the tri-state, metropolitan area.

In January 1972, Eric Steinberg was elected president and chief executive officer of Associated Food Stores, Inc. Chalek remained as chairman of the board. In July, Associated introduced a new slogan: “The little guy is fighting back,” which was advertised extensively in newspapers and on radio at the time. By 1975, the group declared bankruptcy to reorganize its debt. It was bought by the Maidenbaum family in the mid-1970s.

Associated and several other grocers feuded with the New York Daily News when the newspaper published a story in May 2001 that criticized the cleanliness of New York City stores. The co-op was among several others to pull advertisements from the paper. In June, the Daily News ran a four-page advertorial to woo the advertisers back.

In October 2008, two executives at the Associated Supermarket at 229 Knickerbocker Avenue in Bushwick were arrested cheating the store's grocery baggers out of $300,000 in wages and falsifying business records that were given to state officials. In July 2009, the owners of the store and a Pioneer Supermarket in the same neighborhood were ordered to pay $1.1 million in restitution to more than 50 baggers and delivery workers.

In March 2013, AUA Private Equity Partners, a New York-based firm, completed a recapitalization of Associated Food Holdings. Laufer and Gober remained under the new owners.

In January 2014, Associated added the Met Foodmarkets and Pioneer Supermarkets banners to its portfolio. In September, the cooperative's wholesaler, Associated Wholesalers, Inc., declared bankruptcy and was sold to C&S Wholesale Grocers. That month, Bob A. Sigel was named president of Associated Food Stores to replace the retiring Laufer. By November, Associated had signed on with C&S. However, it also maintains partnerships with Porky Products, Nebraskaland, and R-Best Produce, among others.

In 2015, Associated Food Stores officially became Associated Supermarket Group (ASG). In January 2018, Joe Garcia was named chief executive. In 2017, ASG introduced its Avenue A private label with more than 500 products.

In January 2021, AUA sold Associated Supermarket Group to ASG's senior management, led by CEO Joe Garcia and executive vice president Zulema Wiscovitch. Following the sale, Garcia and Wiscovitch were named co-president and co-CEO.
