= Jacob Zorzi =

Jacob Zorzi (also Giacomo Giorgi) was the Marquess of Bodonitsa from 1388 to 1410. He was the last considered true ruler of the Frankish state of Bodonitsa (now known as Mendenitsa).

Jacob was the eldest son of Francis Zorzi of Venice and Euphrosyne of the Cyclades. He succeeded to the throne under his mother's regency after his father's death circa 1388. Before his death, Francis had ceased to pay annual tribute to the Duchy of Athens, though he remained a peer of the Principality of Achaea. In 1393–1394, the Ottoman sultan Bayezid I invaded northern Greece and conquered the County of Salona, a Crusader state established during the Fourth Crusade. Lamia and Neopatria were captured and Pharsala and Domokos were abandoned by the Serbs, whose leader was Jacob's brother-in-law. Bodonitsa was spared and was consequently required to pay tribute to the sultan. In 1403, 1408, and 1409, he was party to the treaties between Venice and the Ottoman prince Süleyman Çelebi and in the first of these succeeded in ridding himself of his obligations of payment of tribute. By a treaty of 1405 between Venice and Antonio I Acciaioli of Athens, he was included to secure his southern border and relieve him of worry there.

He moved many citizens and with livestock to Karystos, the Euboean stronghold of his brother Nicholas, in an attempt to protect them from Turkish assaults, but he was content enough himself to remain in Bodonitsa and bid for Tenos and Mykonos, two islands which Venice was auctioning off in 1406. His bid failed.

Süleyman Çelebi died in 1410 and his successor, Musa Çelebi, renewed the war on Bodonitsa almost instantly. In early spring, Bodonitsa was besieged, Jacob resisted the attack. Nevertheless, he was killed by traitors while defending Thermopylae. His sons, including his eldest and successor, Nicholas II, continued to hold the castle until Venice could send relief, but the relief was too late in coming and the citadel fell and Nicholas was captured.
