= Met Foods =

Independently owned grocery stores

Met Foodmarkets
- Met Foods Logo
- Company type: Banner
- Industry: Grocery Retail
- Founded: 1941
- Headquarters: Port Washington, New York, U.S.
- Area served: New York City, Long Island, Central New Jersey
- Products: Deli, bakery, produce, meats, fish, snacks, non-foods, ethnic foods, frozen foods
- Parent: Associated Supermarket Group (ASG)
- Website: metfoods.com

Met Foodmarkets, also referred to as Met Foods, is a group of independently owned and operated stores, which operates in the New York Metropolitan Area. Most of its stores are in the four boroughs of New York City outside Manhattan and carry a variety of products. Met Foods is a banner of Associated Supermarket Group (ASG). Met Foods has various locations throughout the New York and New Jersey area.

Founded in 1941 in Syosset, Long Island, it was purchased by the DiGiorgio Corporation in 1964–65. The private label brand White Rose Brand (also previously owned by DiGiorgio and by C&S Wholesale Grocers) was common in all Met Foods stores along with Met Foods' less common Met Foods' Brand. Today the private label is Avenue A.

In January 2014, Met Foodmarkets as well as Pioneer Supermarkets banner names were acquired by the Associated Supermarket Group (ASG) company.

ASG is headquartered in Port Washington, New York.
