= Palazzo Zorzi Bon =

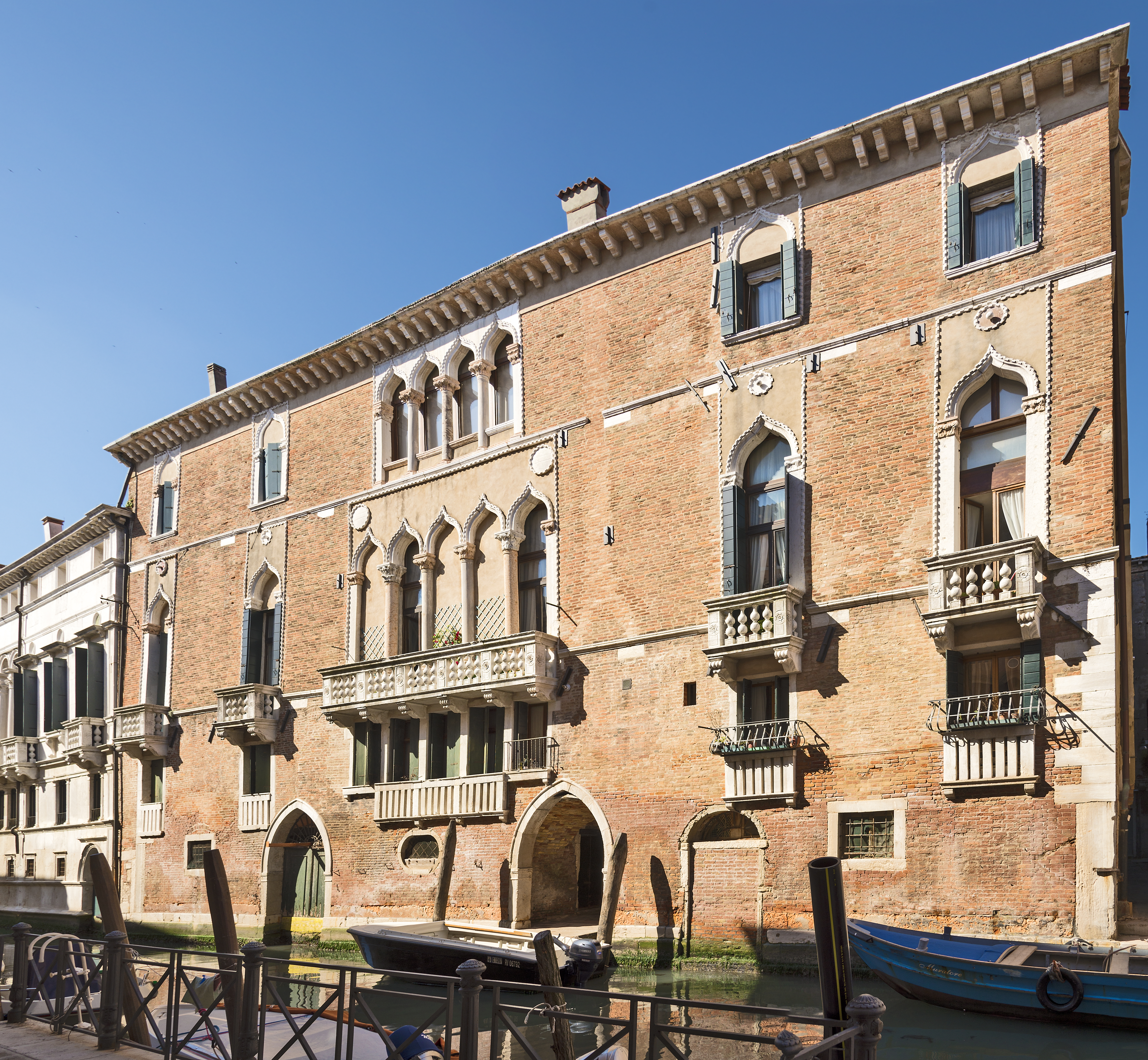
- Palazzo Zorzi Bon
- Interactive map of the Palazzo Zorzi Bon area

General information
- Type: Residential
- Architectural style: Gothic
- Location: Castello district, Venice, Italy
- Coordinates: 45°26′11.62″N 12°20′33.69″E
- Construction started: 14th century

Technical details
- Floor count: 4 levels

Palazzo Zorzi Bon is a historic palace in Venice located in the Castello district. The building inspired the book The Zorzi Affair by the American writer Sylva Prince.

== Architecture ==
The palace has four levels. Squeezed between Palazzo Zorzi Galeoni, with which it was once communicating, and the Palazzo Grimani di Santa Maria Formosa, the Palazzo Zorzi Bon boasts a 14th-century Gothic architecture which, although modified by Renaissance interventions, still retains a pentafora on the noble floor, surmounted by a quadrifora on the attic floor. These windows are each flanked by two pairs of monoforas.

All windows of the noble floor have projecting balconies. On the mezzanine below, the window structure is repeated, albeit with small, rectangular windows. On the ground floor, there are two arched portals to the water, shifted from the centre to the left, with a small oval window between them. To the right of the right portal is the third portal to the water, which was bricked up. The entire facade is made of exposed brickwork; the frames of the openings and the balconies are made of Istrian stone.

== Gallery ==
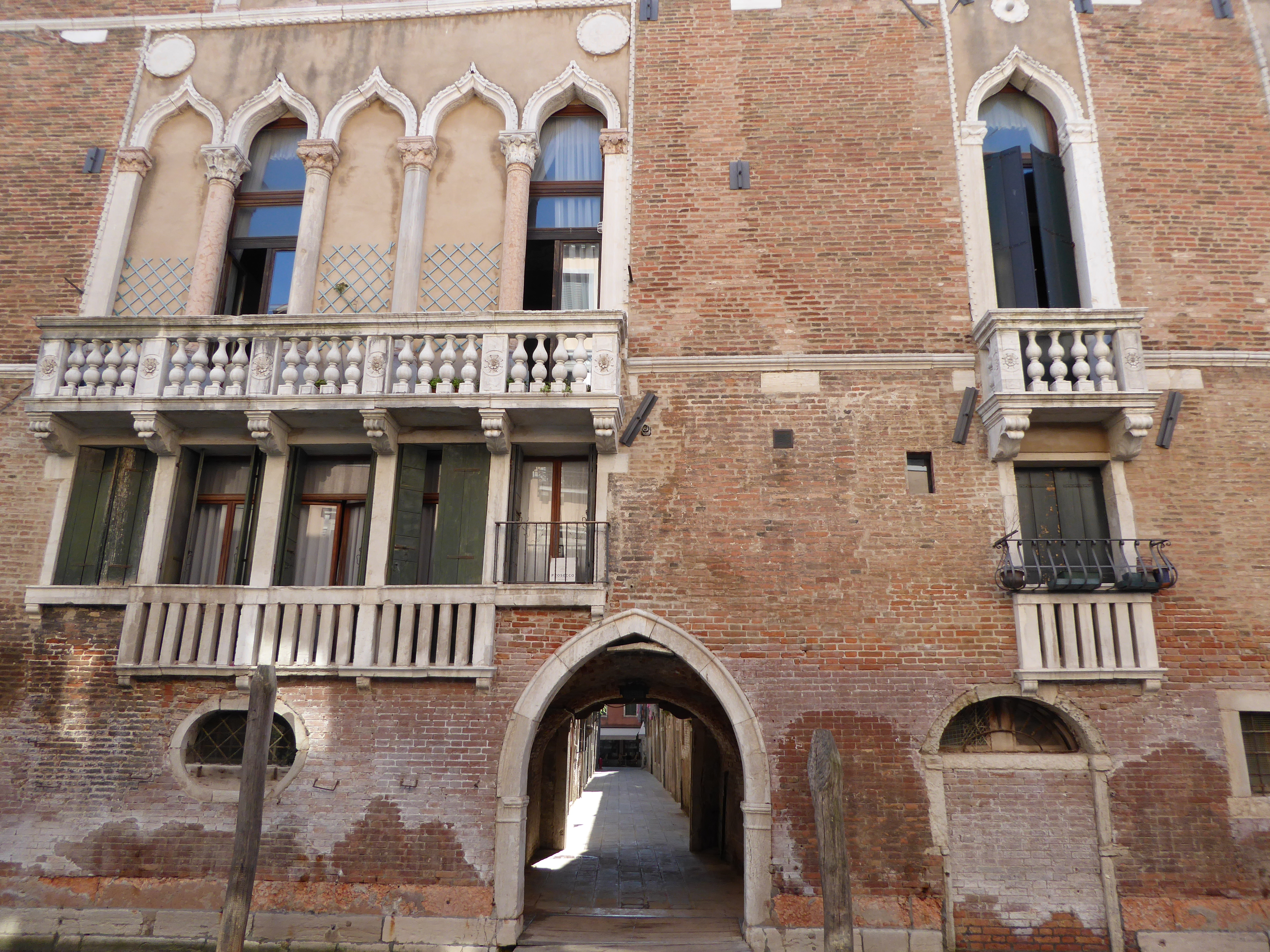
Facade details

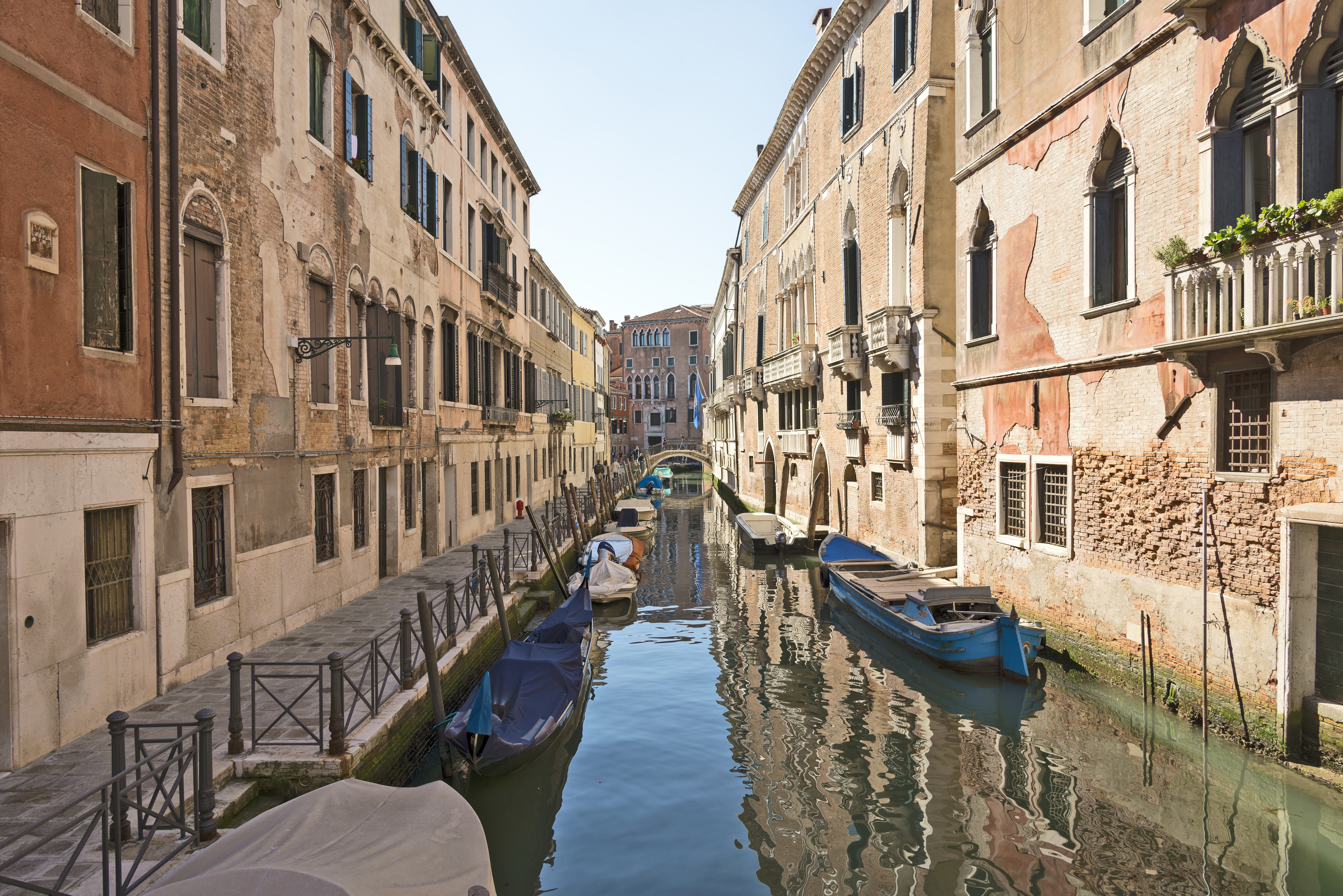
Rio San Severo

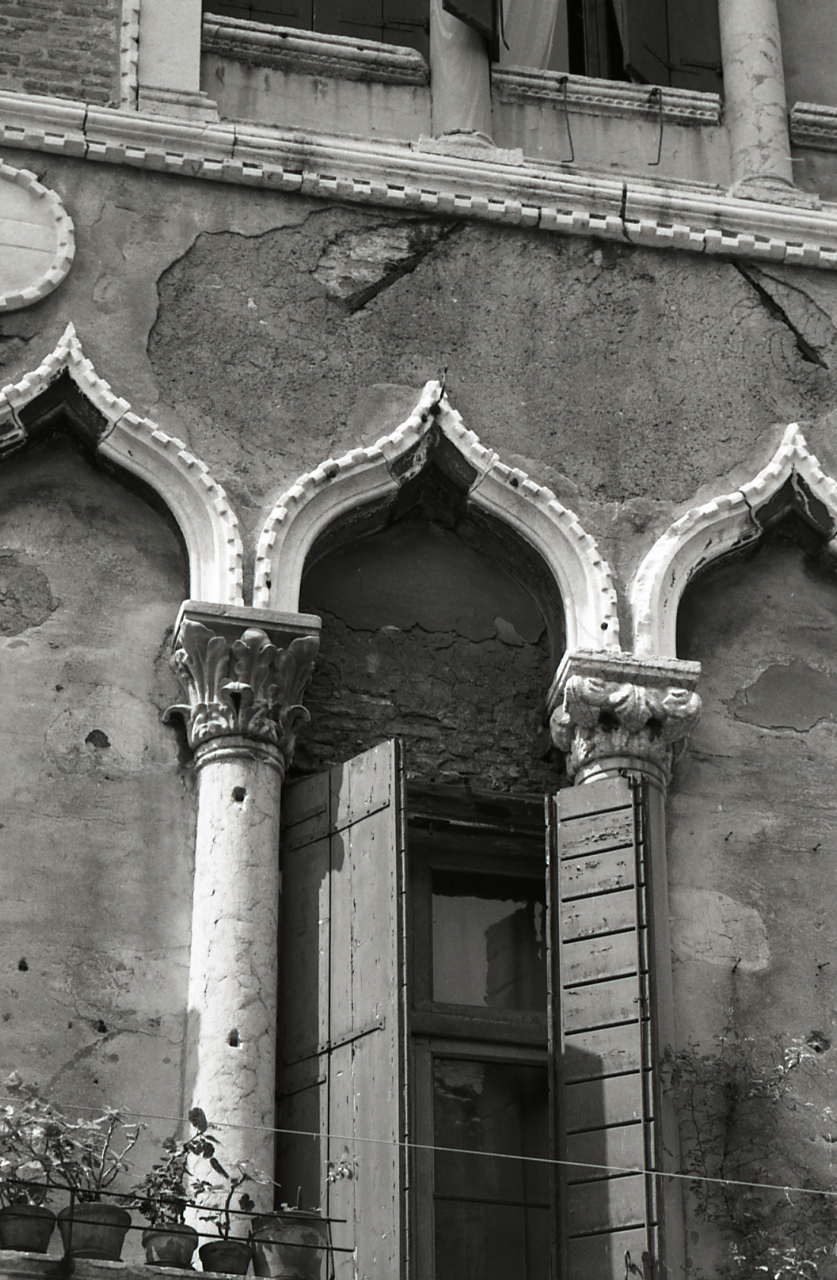
Detail of the facade of the building in a photo by Paolo Monti (1968)

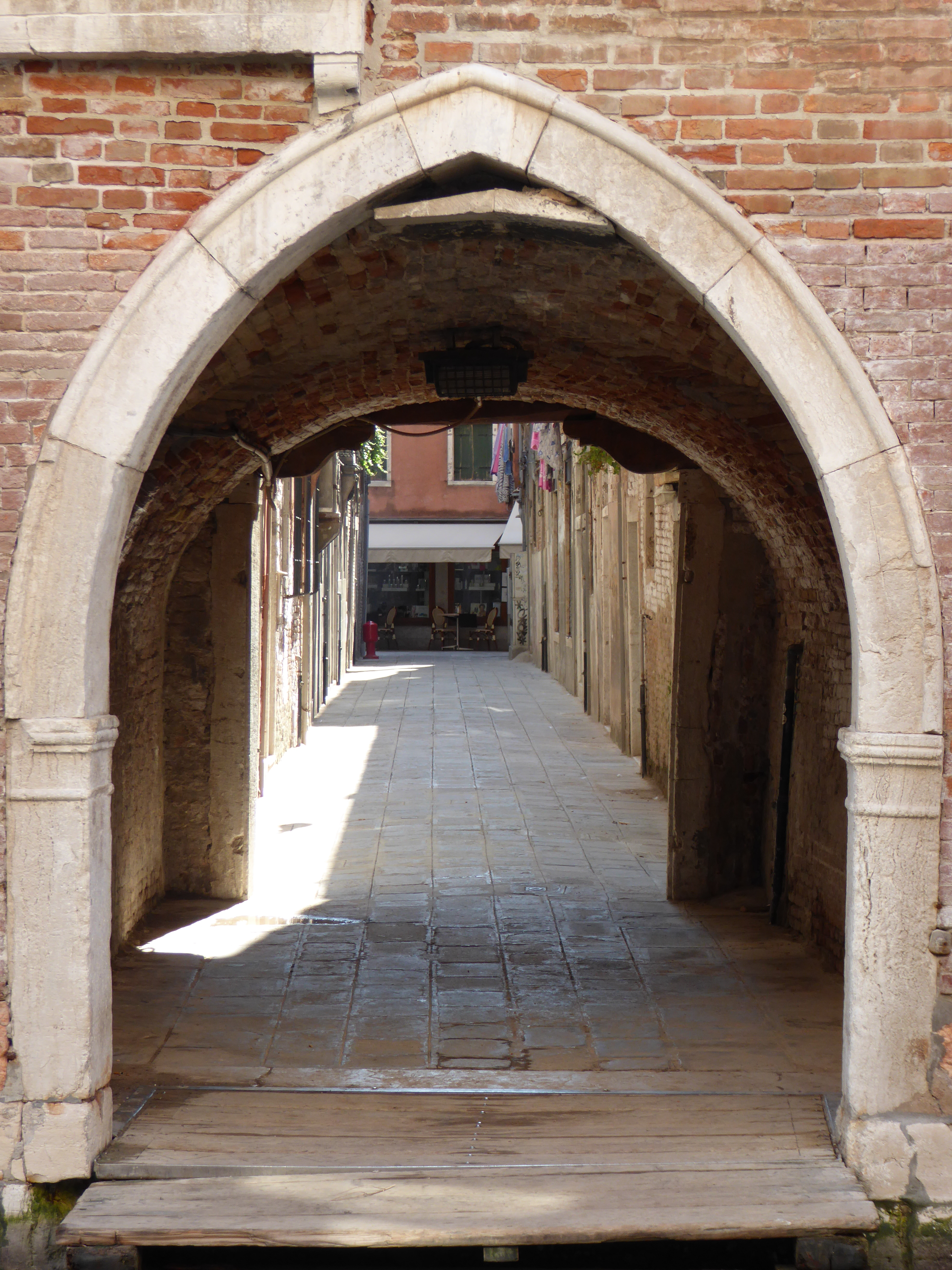
The arc

== See also ==
- Zorzi, a noble family of Venetian origin.
- Palazzo Zorzi Galeoni
