= Di Giorgio =

Di Giorgio may refer to:

- Di Giorgio, California
- DiGiorgio Corporation

== People ==
- Anthony DiGiorgio (1940–2020), American academics administrator
- Francesco di Giorgio (1439–1502), Sienese sculptor
- Frank Di Giorgio, Canadian politician
- Marosa di Giorgio (1932–2004), Uruguayan writer
- Massimo Di Giorgio (born 1958), Italian high jumper
- Steve Di Giorgio (born 1967), American bass guitarist
- Vito Di Giorgio (1880–1922), crime boss
