= Di Giorgi (surname) =

Di Giorgi is a surname.

== List of people with the surname ==
- Giácomo Di Giorgi (born 1981), Venezuelan footballer
- Rosa Maria Di Giorgi (born 1955), Italian politician

== See also ==
- Giorgi (surname)
- Di Giorgio
