= Giorgis =

Giorgis is the name of:

- Brian Giorgis (born 1955), American basketball coach
- Lamberto Giorgis (1932–2019), Italian football player and manager
- Fedele de Giorgis (1887–1964), Italian general
- Giorgis Koutsourelis (1914–1994), composer

== See also ==
- Giorgos
