= Marsilio Zorzi =

Venetian nobleman and statesman

According to family tradition, Marsilio Zorzi adopted this design as his family's coat of arms after the reconquest of Curzola

Marsilio Zorzi (fl. 1234–1271) was a Venetian nobleman and statesman, one of the first notable members of the Zorzi family. In 1242–1244 he served as bailo of Venice in the Kingdom of Jerusalem, where he became involved in the War of the Lombards. During his tenure there, he gathered historical material for his report, which is a crucial historical source on the Crusader states of the Levant. After serving as count of Ragusa in 1252–1254, in 1254 he became the hereditary count of Curzola (Korčula) in Dalmatia, which remained under first Zorzi rule until 1358. Marsilio also served Venice in several civic magistracies, as governor of the Republic of Ragusa, and as a diplomat. He was married but had no offspring.

== Life ==
The early life of Marsilio Zorzi is obscure. He was born, likely in Venice, at the turn of the 13th century. His father, Cardinale, belonged to the San Trovaso branch of the Zorzi family, while the origin of his mother, Maria, is unknown. Marsilio had at least one brother, Marino, and likely sisters, one of whom was the mother of Giacomo Dondulo. At the time of Marsilio's youth, the Zorzi had just begun their ascendance to the higher social and political ranks of the Republic of Venice: his father is known to have been a public treasurer (camerlengo di Comùn) in 1212, and ambassador to Padua in 1216, where he signed the treaty that ended the War of the Castle of Love.

Marsilio's public career is attested from 1234 on. In that year, he was sent as envoy to the autonomous Greek ruler of Rhodes, Leo Gabalas, who had only recently submitted to the Nicaean Empire of John III Vatatzes. Marsilio concluded a treaty with Gabalas, who recognized the suzerainty of the Doge of Venice, pledged his support in the troubled Venetian colony of Crete, and forming a joint front against the Vatatzes. The treaty was of short duration, however, as in the next year Gabalas returned to Nicaean allegiance. After his return from Rhodes, Marsilio was sent as ambassador to Ravenna, to receive a public oath by the commune and its governor to uphold the recent agreement with Venice.

=== Bailo of Acre ===
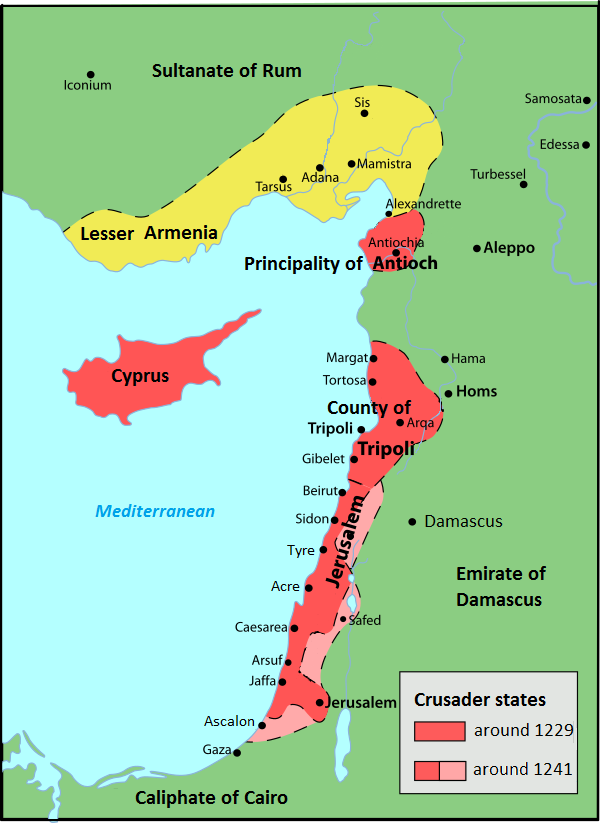
Map of the Crusader states of the Levant in 1240

Marsilio then disappears from the record until the early 1240s, when he is mentioned as bailo of Venice in Acre; he likely arrived in the city with the spring convoy of 1242. At the time, the Kingdom of Jerusalem was torn apart by infighting between pro-Papal and pro-Imperial forces. The Imperial forces occupied the Lordship of Tyre, and in reprisal for Venetian support to the Papal camp, Richard Filangieri, the viceroy for Emperor Frederick II Hohenstaufen, had allowed the confiscation of all Venetian property in Tyre. Not only that, but the pro-Imperials were moving against Acre as well.

As a result, Marsilio backed the pro-Papal barons, who succeeded in capturing Tyre in June 1242. According to Marsilio's account, the Venetian inhabitants of Tyre contributed to its fall, likely by providing information about its defences. Marsilio secured a restitution of Venetian possessions and privileges from Balian of Ibelin, as well as the Venetian share of taxation from the royal portion of the city. Despite opposition from royal officials, Marsilio was also able to claim de facto jurisdiction over Venetian citizens accused of crimes. Marsilio returned to Venice in 1244.

=== Count of Curzola ===
The sources are again silent on Marsilio's life between 1244 and May 1252, when he was appointed governor of the Republic of Ragusa (modern Dubrovnik), which had just submitted to Venice, with the title of count. His tenure, which lasted until July 1254, was successful: he concluded an alliance with the Bulgarian tsar Michael II Asen against the Serb king, Stefan Uroš I, and his rule was seen as just and prudent.

As a result of this success, in April 1254 the inhabitants of the nearby Dalmatian island of Curzola (Korčula) asked him to become their hereditary governor (comes perpetuus, 'perpetual count'). Marsilio accepted, but his rule was not to the Curzolans' liking: after two years in office he was expelled. Marsilio armed a galley and returned to the island, taking power again on 30 July 1256. It was on this occasion, according to family tradition, that Marsilio changed his coat of arms from the chequered blue and silver design used by the other branches of the family to that of a red band on silver field, supposedly symbolizing the smear left by Marsilio's red sword on a white flag.

To aid him in the administration of Curzola—and recover the expense of its recapture—Marsilio established a consortium of Venetian citizens. Marsilio himself apparently spent most of his time in Venice, as he was a judge there in 1255 and 1263, ducal councillor in 1261, a member of the Great Council of Venice in 1261/62, 1264/65, and 1267/68, and was involved in negotiations with Ravenna and Rimini in 1260/61. In his stead he sent representatives to govern Curzola and nearby Mèleda (Mljet). In 1265, the statute of Curzola (Statuta Curzolae), which had originally been written in 1214, was renewed, and gave Marsilio full control over all lands not actively cultivated by the locals at least a year before the date of his re-establishment.

On 30 January 1270, Marsilio, near his seventies and likely ill, composed two wills, one for his possessions in Venice itself (which mostly went to his wife) and one for Curzola, where he donated sums to churches and for public works, as well as arranging for his succession: being childless, he stipulated that the first of his relatives who within a month of Marsilio's death presented himself to the Procurators of Saint Mark and asked for the lordship, would receive it. When Marsilio died in October or November 1271, Ruggero Zorzi of the San Angelo branch, head of the Council of Forty in that year, presented himself to the procurators and received the county of Curzola. The succession over Mèleda was immediately contested by the local monastery of St. Mary, but it was not until 1338 that the Venetian Senate reached a decision in the monastery's favour. Zorzi rule would continue in Curzola until the island was conquered in 1358 by King Louis I of Hungary.

== Family ==
Marsilio Zorzi married once, to a certain Marchesina; either her family nor the date of their marriage are known. The couple was childless, and Marchesina remarried soon after Zorzi's death, to Leonardo Venier, a procurator of Saint Mark.

== Works ==
During his tenure as bailo of Acre, Zorzi collected documents and oral reports about the history of the Venetian presence in the Levant and Cyprus, which he compiled into a report. Its manuscript, preserved in the Querini-Stampalia Library in Venice, is one of the main historical sources for the Crusader states of the period.

- Berggötz, Oliver (1991). Der Bericht des Marsilio Zorzi. Codex Querini-Stampalia IV3 (1064). Frankfurt am Main: Peter Lang. 262 pages.

An older edition of the text can be found in:

- Tafel, Gottlieb; Thomas, Georg (1856). Urkunden zur älteren Handels- und Staatsgeschichte der Republik Venedig. Vienna. p. 354-398.

== Sources ==
- Jacoby, David (2016). "The Venetian Presence in the Crusader Lordship of Tyre: A Tale of Decline". In Boas, Adrian J. (ed.). The Crusader World. Venice: Routledge. pp. 181–195. ISBN 978-0-415-82494-1.
- Mazzon, Martino (2020). "ZORZI, Marsilio". Dizionario Biografico degli Italiani (in Italian). Vol. 100: Vittorio Emanuele I–Zurlo. Rome: Istituto dell'Enciclopedia Italiana. ISBN 978-88-12-00032-6.
- Setton, Kenneth M. (1976). The Papacy and the Levant (1204–1571), Volume I: The Thirteenth and Fourteenth Centuries. Philadelphia: The American Philosophical Society. ISBN 0-87169-114-0.
