= Zorba's Dance =

1965 instrumental by Mikis Theodorakis

Instrumental
- Published: 1964
- Released: 1965
- Composer: Mikis Theodorakis

"Zorba's Dance" (Greek: Ο Χορός Του Ζορμπά) is an instrumental by Greek composer Mikis Theodorakis. The music is part of the soundtrack for the 1964 film Zorba the Greek, and used in the film to accompany the dance known as sirtaki. It is now commonly played and danced to in Greek tavernas. The film's track has since been recorded as a standalone song by many different musicians from around the world.

== Background ==
The music of "Zorba's Dance" was composed by Mikis Theodorakis, who derived it from rebetiko, a form of urban music performed by Greek musicians with Turkish makam modes. The music, and its song "Strose To Stroma Sou Gia Dio" ("Make Your Bed for Two"), was adapted from a syrtos traditional composition from Chania by the Cretan musician Giorgis Koutsourelis, which was chosen as it had "energetic rhythm" and some resemblance to the rebetiko. The soundtrack recording was performed on a bouzouki.

The original soundtrack credited to Mikis Theodorakis was released as a single in 1965. It was among a number of different versions performed by different artists released around the world the same year due to the success of the film. Mikis Theodorakis's soundtrack version topped the charts in Austria and Belgium, and reached No. 5 on the Dutch Top 40 (which aggregated different versions). and No. 7 in West Germany.

The music, as with other works by Mikis Theodorakis, was banned by the Greek junta that ruled Greece from 1967 to 1974.

=== Sirtaki dance ===
The dance accompanied by the music of "Zorba's Dance" has been named "sirtaki". It was created specifically for the film rather than a traditional form of dance. The name suggests it was created based on "syrtos", a type of dance where the dancers drag their feet instead of hopping, however, the dance incorporates both a slower style hasapiko dance, and a faster one called hasaposerviko. The dance has become a popular form of Greek dance.

== Charts ==
Chart (1965)	Peak position
Austria (Ö3 Austria Top 40)	1
Belgium (Ultratop 50 Flanders)	1
Belgium (Ultratop 50 Wallonia)	1
Netherlands (Single Top 100)	6
Norway (VG-lista)	4
West Germany (GfK)	7

== Other recorded versions ==
- In the US, Herb Alpert and the Tijuana Brass recorded a brass version of the song (as "Zorba the Greek") for their 1965 album Going Places. Issued as an edited single with live audience dubbed in, the song reached number 11 on the Billboard Hot 100 chart and number 2 on the Easy Listening chart.
- Marcello Minerbi & His Orchestra released their recording (Durium Records DRS 54001), which reached number 6 in the UK Singles Chart in August 1965, and number 8 on the Irish chart.
- Duo Acropolis released a version which charted at No. 5 in the Netherlands and No. 1 in Belgium in 1965.
- Trio Hellenique released a version in Belgium which reached No. 1 in the Flemish chart.
- Jørgen Ingmann released a version titled "Zorba" in 1965 in West Germany, which reached No. 13.
- Dalida recorded a vocal version called "La danse de Zorba" with French lyrics by Françoise Dorin, which reached No. 24 on the Belgian Walloon chart in 1965.
- Atenna released a trance version in 1993 titled "Zorba The Greek", and it reached No. 31 on the Dutch chart and No. 22 on the Flemish chart.
- The British dance act LCD covered the song in 1998. Their version peaked at number 20 in the UK chart that year, and at number 22 when re-issued in October 1999. It also peaked at number 13 in Australia and was certified platinum.

== Legacy ==
The composition provided the inspiration for "Bend It!", a 1966 hit single by British group Dave Dee, Dozy, Beaky, Mick & Tich that reached number one in New Zealand, South Africa and West Germany.

== In contemporary culture ==
- The song is infamous in Peru for its association with Shining Path (Sendero Luminoso). In the early 1990s, excerpts of a video of Sendero Luminoso's leadership dancing to the song during a celebration was given to the media, showing that the organization's heads were hiding in middle-class districts of Lima itself.
- The song was featured, among others, in the film Lock, Stock and Two Smoking Barrels, and in the "Subdivision" episode of Prison Break, where Charles "Haywire" Patoshik raided a fast food joint and gorged himself on soda and ice cream.
- The instrumental was also performed as the interval act Folk Dances From Different Countries by the Igor Moiseyev Ensemble in the 2nd. Semifinal of the Eurovision Song Contest 2009 in Moscow, Russia.
- The track was also used for the Greek entry in the Eurovision Dance Contest 2007 held in London, United Kingdom performed by Ourania Kolliou and Spiros Pavlidis as their 2nd dance. They finished 13th with 31 points.
