= Istrian stone =

Type of limestone

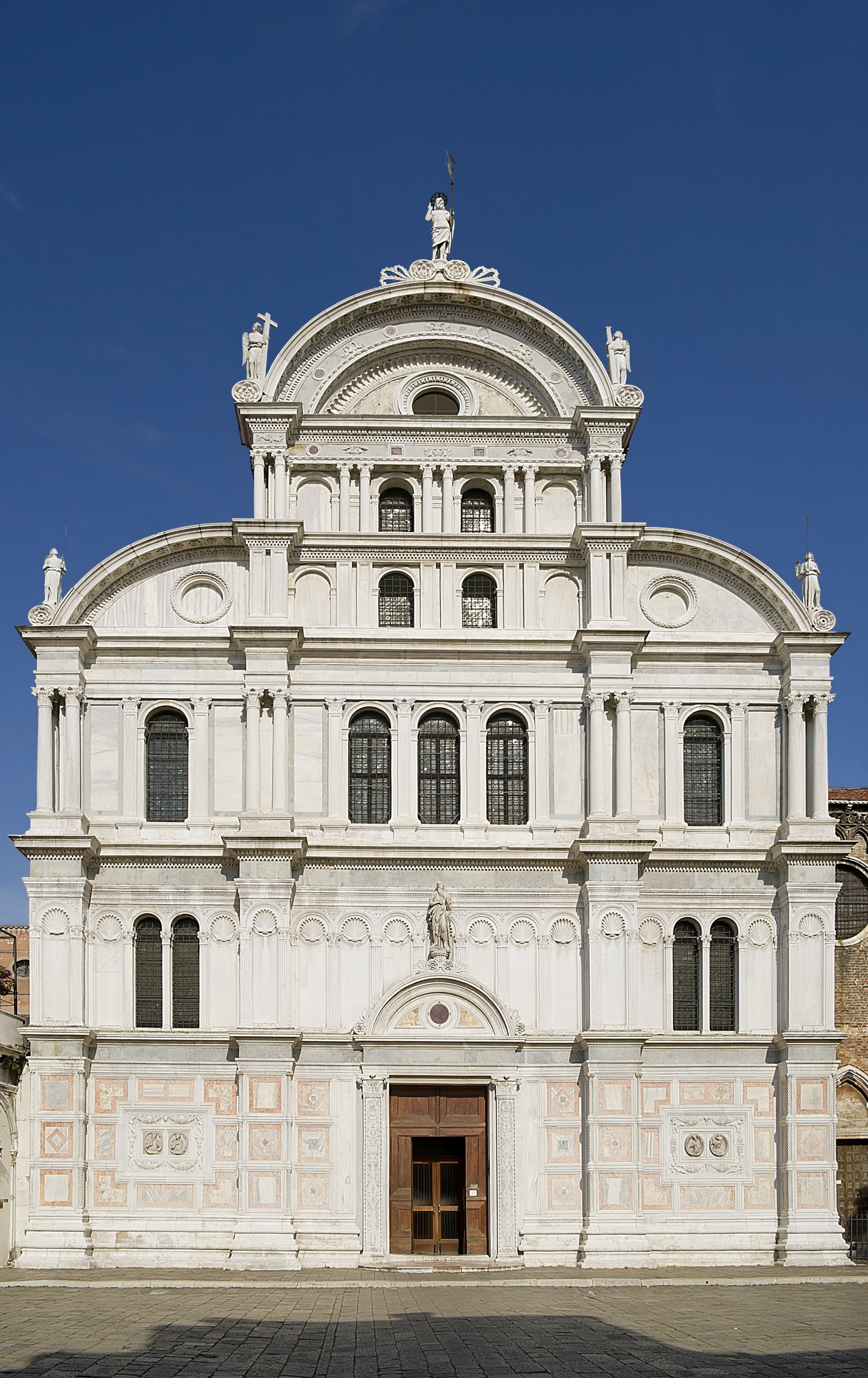
San Zaccaria, Venice, Mauro Codussi completed the upper parts of a church begun in Gothic, using contrasting stones.

Istrian stone, pietra d'Istria, the characteristic group of building stones in the architecture of Venice, Istria and Dalmatia, is a dense type of impermeable limestone that was quarried in Istria, nowadays Croatia; between Portorož and Pula. Limestone is a biogenetic stone composed of calcium carbonate from the tests and shells of marine creatures laid down over eons. Istrian stone approaches the compressive strength and density of marble, which is metamorphosed limestone. It is often loosely referred to as "marble", which is not strictly correct.

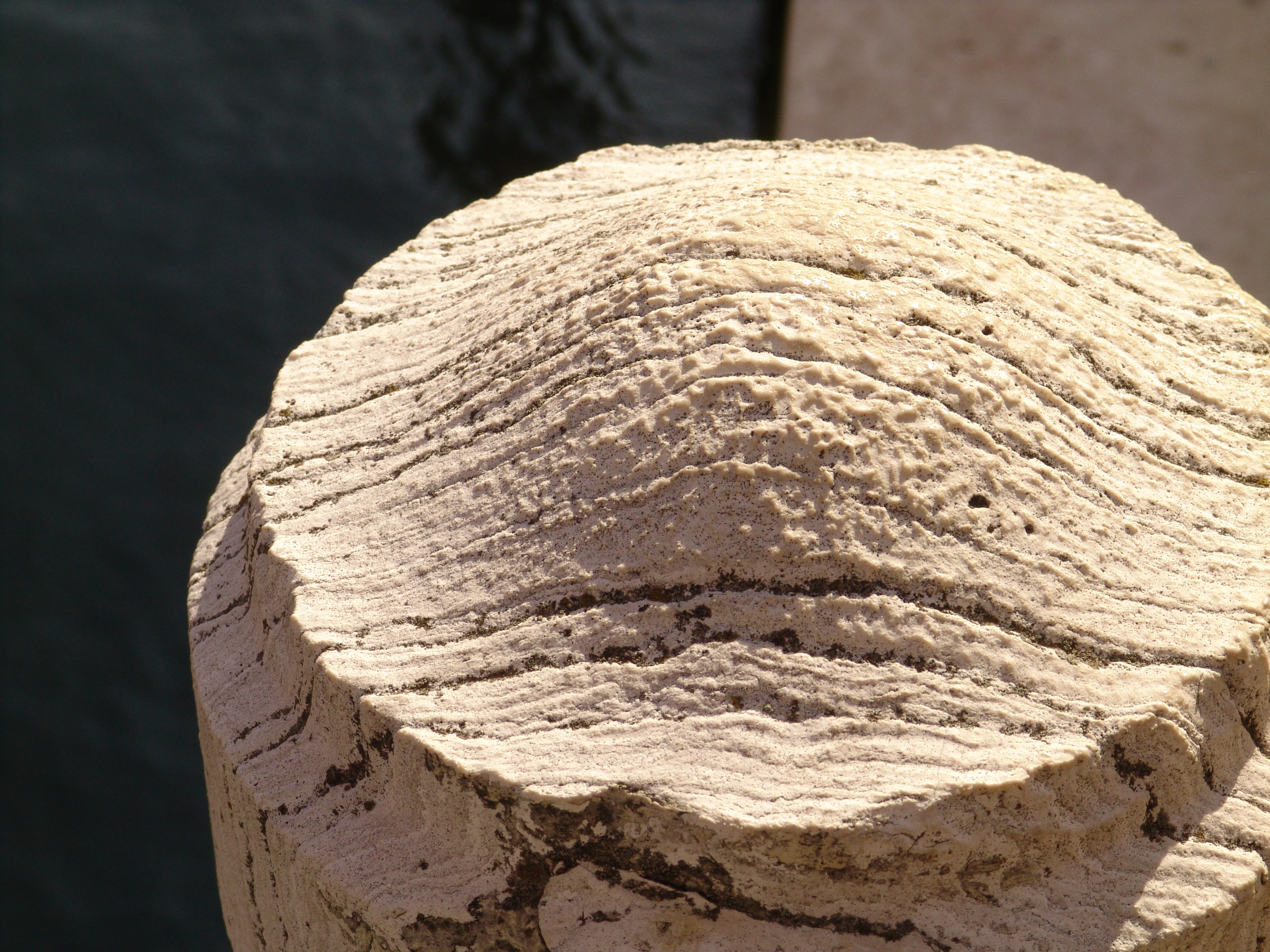
Weathered Istrian limestone in Venice

Venice, isolated in its lagoon, had no building stone at hand. The freshly quarried stone is salt-white or light yellowish, which weathers to a pale gray; the whiteness of Istrian stone contrasts well with coloured stones and brick. When Francesco, son of the architect Jacopo Sansovino, wrote Venetia citta nobilissima et singolare (1580) he emphasized the distinctive quality that Istrian stone and the coppery-red Verona brocatello limestone (so-called Veronese marble) lent to the city. It was brought, Sansovino said, from Rovigno and Brioni on the Istrian coast.

== See also ==
- List of types of limestone
