= Di Giorgio, California =

Unincorporated community in California, United States

- Unincorporated community Census designated place
- Location within California
- Coordinates: 35°14′55.83″N 118°50′38.95″W
- Country: United States
- State: California
- County: Kern
- County Subdivision: Bakersfield CCD

Area
  - Total: 0.085 sq mi (0.22 km^{2})
  - Land: 0.085 sq mi (0.22 km^{2})
  - Water: 0 sq mi (0 km^{2})
- Elevation: 495 ft (151 m)

Population (2020)
  - Total: 400
  - Density: 4,700/sq mi (1,800/km^{2})
- Time zone: UTC-8 (PST)
  - Summer (DST): UTC-7 (PDT)
- GNIS feature ID: 2804113

Di Giorgio is an unincorporated community and census designated place (CDP) in Kern County, California, United States. It is located 6.5 miles (10 km) south of Edison, at an elevation of 495 feet (151 m). As of the 2020 census, Di Giorgio had a population of 400.

The first post office at Di Giorgio opened in 1944. The name honors Joseph Di Giorgio, agricultural entrepreneur and founder of DiGiorgio Corporation. Di Giorgio overlies the large Mountain View Oil Field, and gives its name to one of the field's many productive areas.

== Demographics ==
Historical population
Census	Pop.	Note	%±
2020	400		—
U.S. Decennial Census; 1860–1870 1880-1890; 1900 1910 1920; 1930 1940 1950; 1960 1970 1980; 1990 2000 2010; 2020

Di Giorgio was first listed as a census designated place in the 2020 census.

=== 2020 Census ===
Di Giorgio CDP, California – Racial and ethnic composition Note: the US Census treats Hispanic/Latino as an ethnic category. This table excludes Latinos from the racial categories and assigns them to a separate category. Hispanics/Latinos may be of any race.
Race / Ethnicity (NH = Non-Hispanic)	Pop 2020	% 2020
White alone (NH)	6	1.50%
Black or African American alone (NH)	0	0.00%
Native American or Alaska Native alone (NH)	0	0.00%
Asian alone (NH)	0	0.00%
Native Hawaiian or Pacific Islander alone (NH)	0	0.00%
Other race alone (NH)	0	0.00%
Mixed race or Multiracial (NH)	1	0.25%
Hispanic or Latino (any race)	393	98.25%
Total	400	100.00%

== See also ==
- DiGiorgio Elementary School
