= Mauro Codussi =

Italian architect

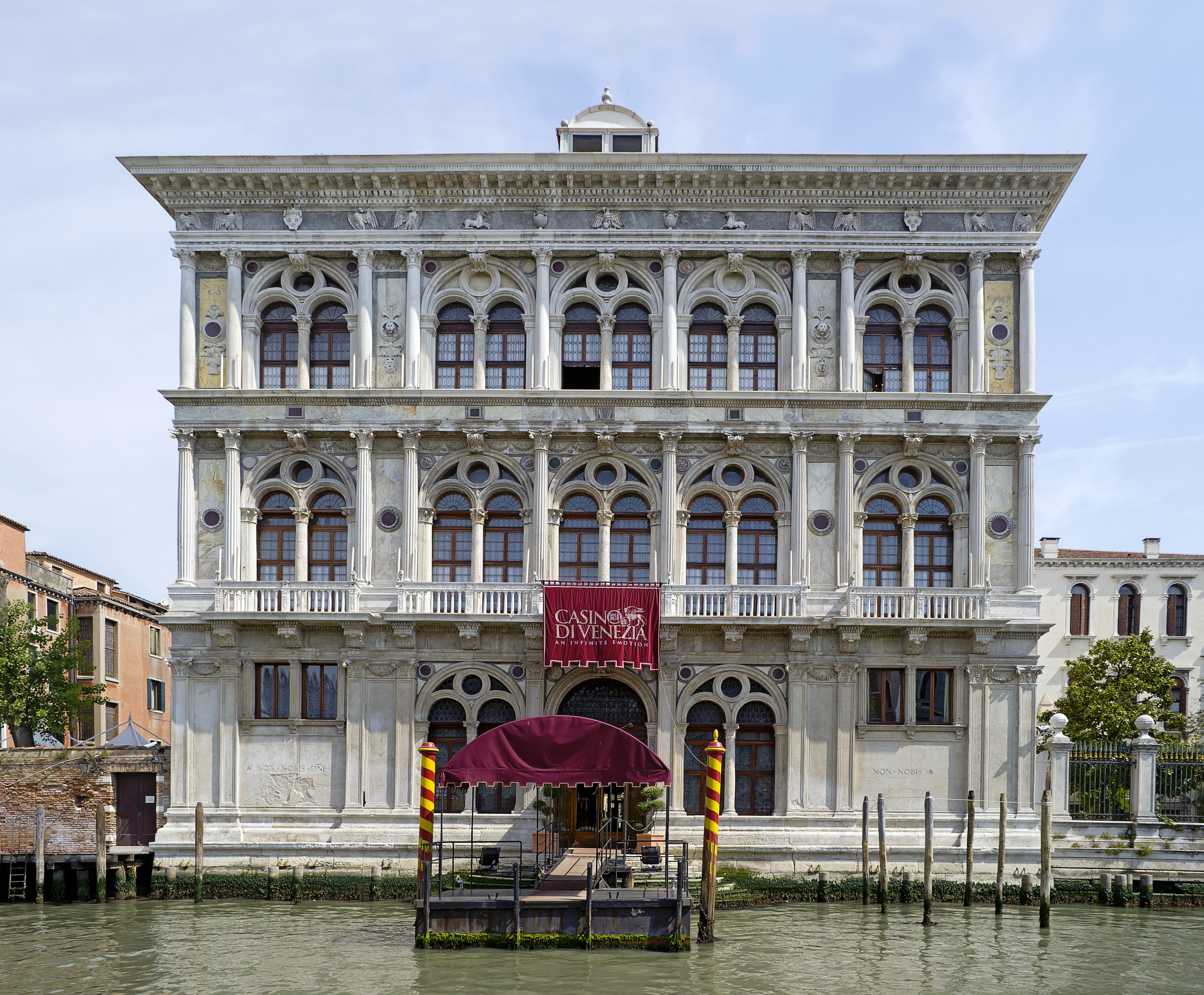
Ca' Vendramin Calergi, from 1481

Mauro Codussi (1440–1504) was an Italian architect of the Renaissance, active mostly in Venice. The name is also rendered as Coducci. He was one of the first to bring the neo-classical style of the Renaissance to Venice to replace the prevalent Byzantine and Gothic styles.

Born near in Lenna, near Bergamo about 1440, he is first recorded in Venice in 1469, where he was working on the church of San Michele in Isola (completed in 1480), an island north of Venice, halfway to Murano, where Venice now has its cemetery. Little is known of his early experience and training.

Other works include San Zaccaria, San Giovanni Crisostomo and Santa Maria Formosa, and the residences Ca' Vendramin Calergi and Palazzo Zorzi Galeoni.

The St Mark's Clocktower (Torre dell'Orologio), built in the Piazza San Marco between 1496 and 1499, is also attributed to him.
