= LCD (music act) =

- Origin: United Kingdom
- Genres: Dance-pop, Eurodance
- Years active: 1998-2000
- Labels: Virgin

LCD were a computer generated dance act, active in the late 1990s. Signed to Virgin Records, their only hit single was a Europop version of the Greek song "Zorba's Dance". The music video to the song, made in computerised animation, featured a band of overweight men playing the song.

The single was a club hit in the UK, charting twice in the top 40 of the UK Singles Chart, within 18 months of its original release, and was one of the first of its kind which was enabled to be played on a computer for its music video. The song was a big club hit in Australia due to its large Greek community supporting the song. The CD single proclaimed LCD "The world's first digital supergroup". The man behind the act was David K, a London-based record producer.

A second single, "Follow the Leader (Leader)", did not chart in the UK and in 2000, LCD was discontinued. The video for "Follow the Leader (Leader)" shows the act's name LCD stands for "Large Cool Dudes". The video also shows the four leading men were called Zed, Ed, Ned and Ted.

== Discography ==
List of singles, with selected chart positions
Title	Year	Peak chart positions			Certification
Title	Year	UK	AUS	NLD	Certification
"Zorba's Dance"	1998	20	13	15	ARIA: Platinum
"Zorba's Dance" (re-issue)	1999	22	—	—	
"Follow the Leader (Leader)"	2000	—	100	—	
