= Palazzo Zorzi Galeoni =

Coordinates: 45.4361°N 12.3428°E

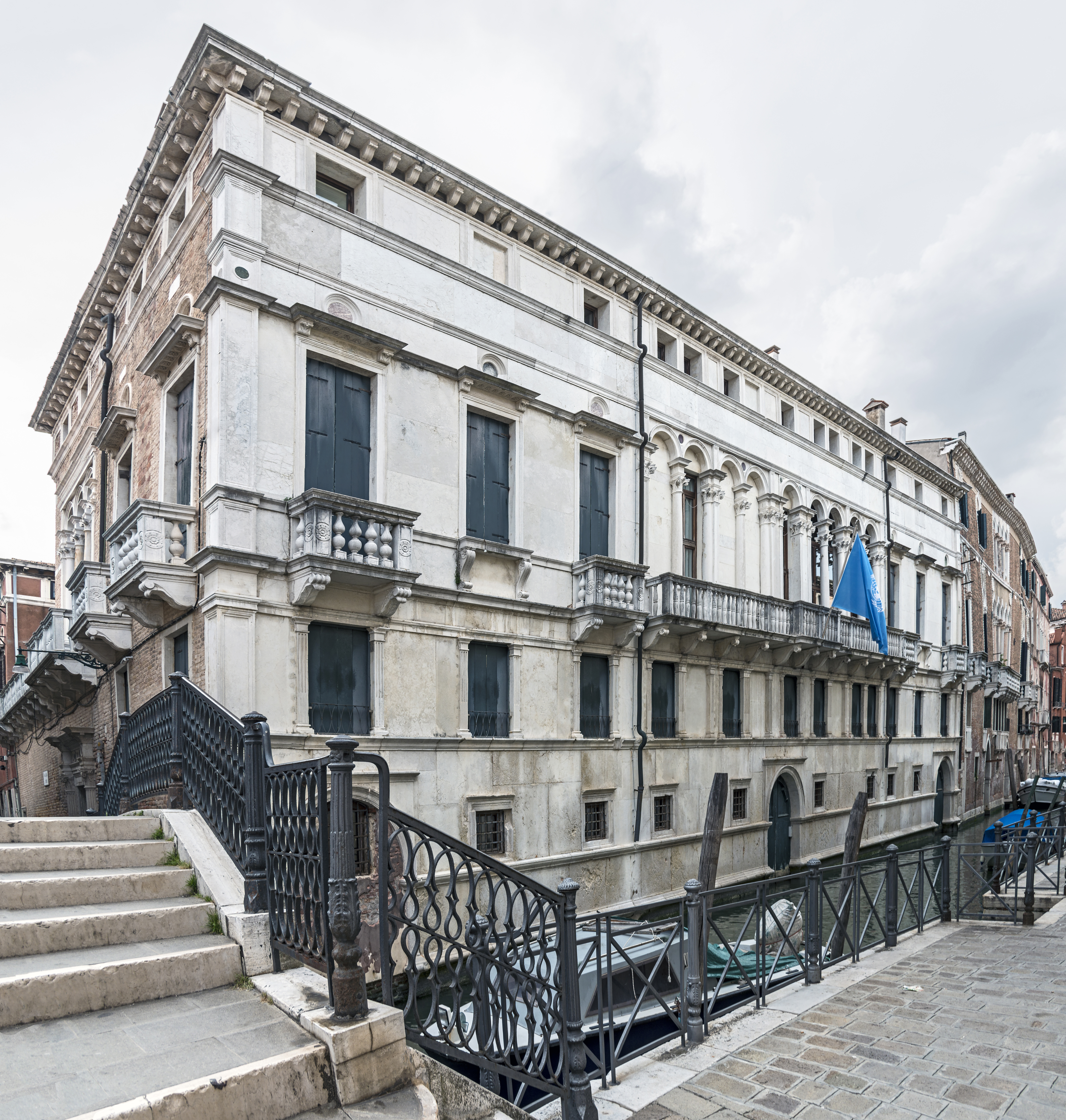
- Palazzo Zorzi Galeoni, facade on Rio San Severo

General information
- Type: Palace
- Architectural style: Renaissance architecture
- Location: Venice, Castello 4930, Italy
- Owner: Venice Municipality

Design and construction
- Architect: Mauro Codussi

The Palazzo Zorzi Galeoni or Palazzo Zorzi a Rio San Severo is a Renaissance style palace of the Zorzi family (also spelled Giorgi) in the Sestiere of Castello, number 4930, in central Venice, Italy; it was designed after 1480 by Mauro Codussi. It lies a few streets away from Santa Maria Formosa, also designed by Codussi. There are several Zorzi palaces in Venice, including the Palazzo Zorzi Liassidi and Palazzo Zorzi Bon.

The Zorzi Galeoni in 2018 houses the offices of UNESCO Regional Bureau for Science and Culture in Europe. The United Nations Educational, Scientific and Cultural Organization. It seeks to build peace through international cooperation in Education, the Sciences and Culture.

== Gallery ==
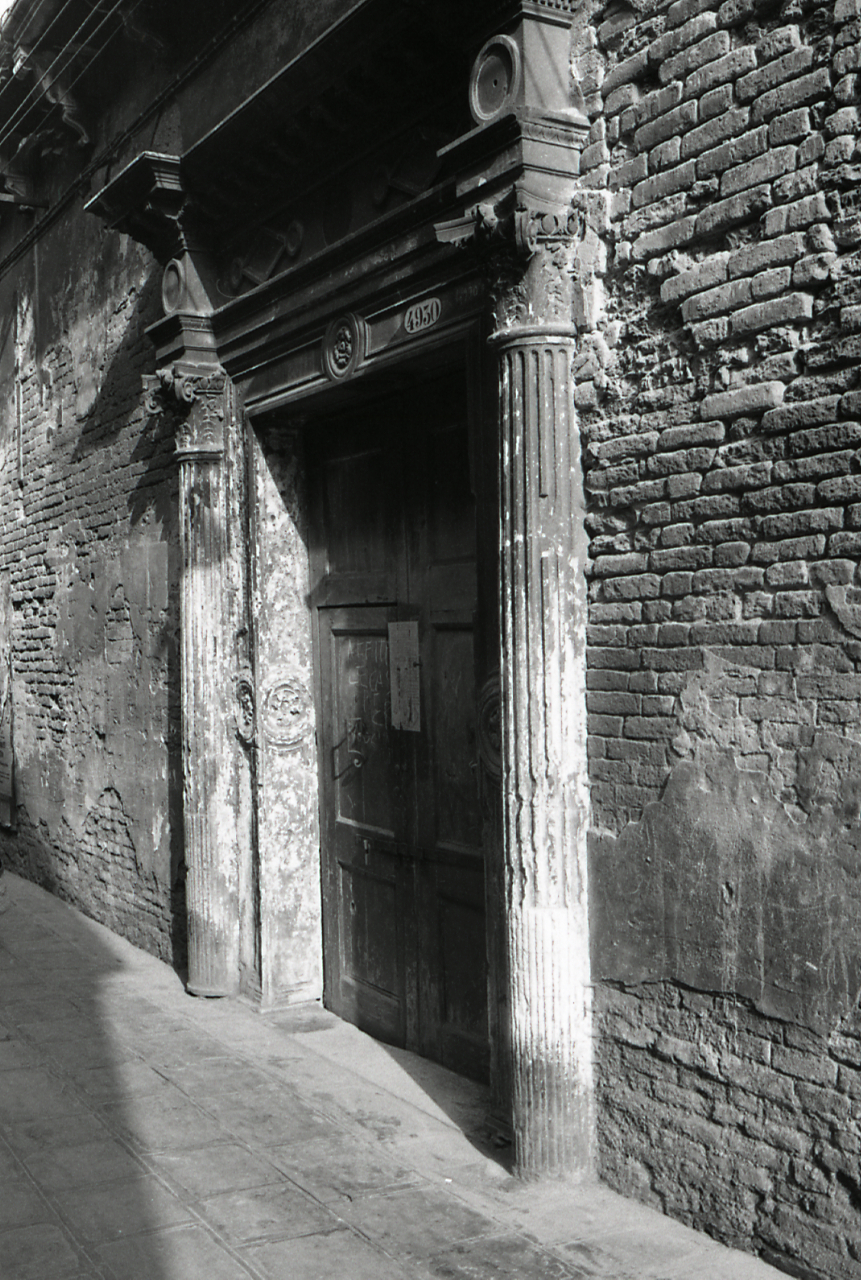
Palazzo Zorzi Galeoni, entrance. Photo by Paolo Monti

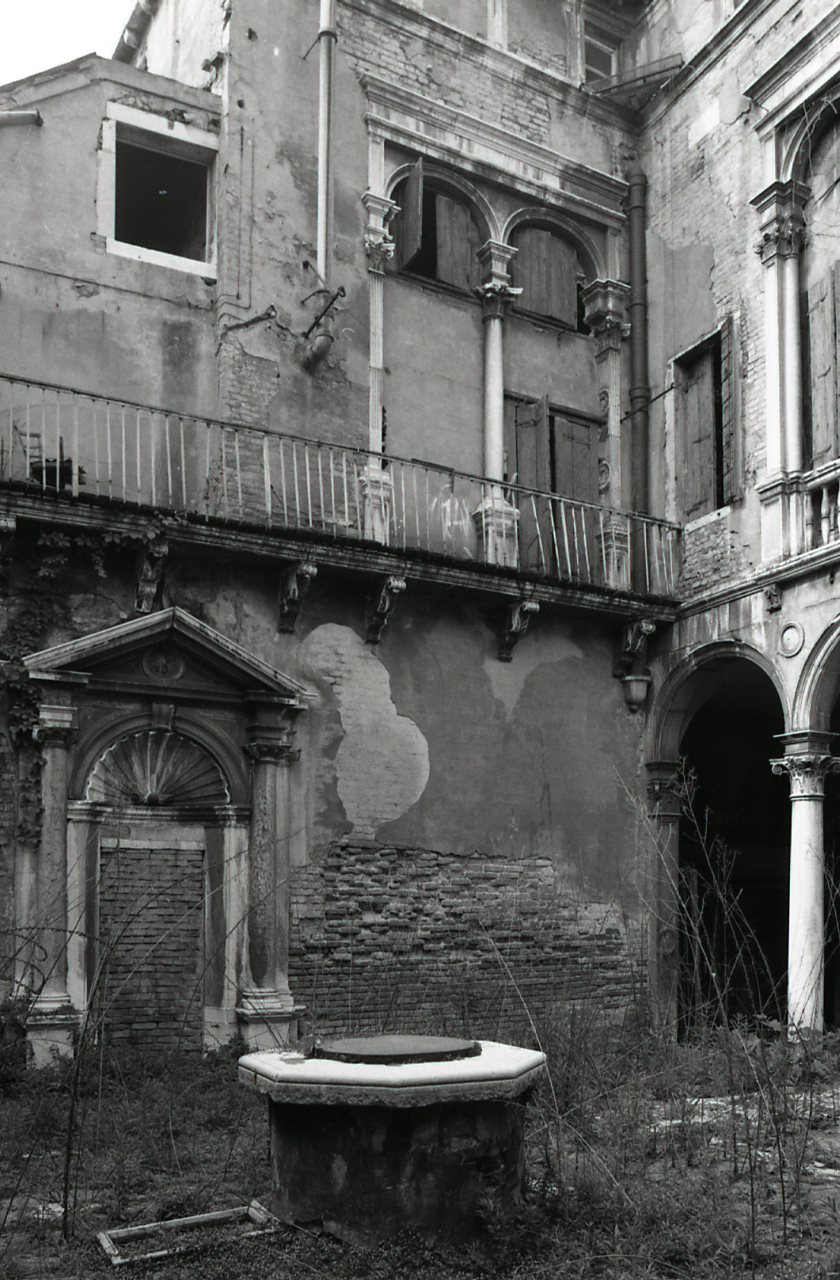
Palace courtyard (photo by Paolo Monti).

== See also ==
- Zorzi
- Palazzo Zorzi Bon
