= Giorgi (surname) =

Giorgi is an Italian surname. Notable people with the surname include:

- Agostino Antonio Giorgi (1711–1797), Augustinian monk and scholar
- Alessandro Giorgi (born 1993), Italian motorcycle racer
- Alex Giorgi (born 1957), Italian alpine skier
- Camila Giorgi (born 1991), Italian tennis player
- Débora Giorgi, Argentine politician
- Edolo J. Giorgi (1921–1993), American politician
- Eleonora Giorgi (1953–2025), Italian actress and film director
- Eleonora Giorgi (racewalker) (born 1989), Italian race walker
- Elsie Giorgi (died 1998), American physician
- Ennio De Giorgi (1928–1996), Italian mathematician
- Francesco Giorgi (1466–1540), Venetian Franciscan friar and author
- Francesco Giorgi (judoka) (born 1970), Judo
- Frank Giorgi (born 1981), Australian kickboxer of Italian origin
- Giácomo Di Giorgi (born 1981), Venezuelan footballer
- Giovanni Giorgi (1871–1950), Italian electrical engineer
- Hugo Giorgi (1920-?), Argentine footballer
- Luciano Giorgi (born 1940), Italian politician
- Melina Giorgi, Argentinian politician
- Monica Giorgi (born 1946), Italian former professional tennis player
- Oreste Giorgi (1882-1962), italian-brazilian railway worker and trade unionist
- Rosa Maria Di Giorgi (born 1955), Italian politician

== See also ==
- Giorgi (name), a Georgian name
- Di Giorgi (surname)
