= Giorgi (name) =

Giorgi (/ɡiːɒrɡiː/; Georgian: გიორგი, romanized: giorgi) is a Georgian masculine name being the most popular name in Georgia. It may refer to:

- Giorgi I (998/1002–1027), king of Georgia 1014-1027
- Giorgi II (c.1054–1112), king of Georgia 1072-1089
- Giorgi III (died 1184), king of Georgia 1156-1184
- Giorgi IV (1192–1223), king of Georgia 1213-1223
- Giorgi V (1286/1289–1346), king of Georgia 1299-1302 and 1314-1346
- Giorgi VI (died 1313), king of Georgia 1311-1313
- Giorgi VII (died 1405 or 1407), king of Georgia 1393-1407 or 1395-1405
- Giorgi VIII (1417–1476), king of Georgia 1446-1465
- Giorgi IX (died 1539), king of Kartli 1525-1527 or 1525-1534
- Giorgi X (c.1561–1606), king of Kartli 1599-1606
- Giorgi XI (1651–1709), king of Kartli 1676-1688 and 1703-1709
- Giorgi XII (1746-1800), last king of Georgia 1798-1800
- Giorgi Merchule (fl. 10th c.), Georgian monk, calligrapher and writer
- Giorgi Chkondideli (died c. 1118), Georgian churchman and court minister
- Giorgi Dodisi (fl. 12th c.), Georgian calligrapher
- Giorgi Saakadze (c. 1570–1629), Georgian military commander
- Giorgi Asanidze (born 1975), Georgian weightlifter
- Giorgi Baramia (born 1966), Georgian diplomat
- Giorgi Baramidze (born 1968), Georgian politician
- Giorgi Chogovadze (born 1969), Soviet diver
- Giorgi Demetradze (born 1976), Georgian footballer
- Giorgi Eristavi (1813–1864), Georgian playwright
- Giorgi Gakharia (born 1975), 14th Prime Minister of Georgia
- Giorgi Gugava (born 1974), Georgian politician
- Giorgi Kochorashvili (born 1999), Georgian footballer
- Giorgi Kvirikashvili (born 1967), 12th Prime Minister of Georgia
- Giorgi Latso (born 1978), Georgian-American pianist and composer
- Giorgi Lomaia (born 1979), Georgian footballer
- Giorgi Loria (born 1986), Georgian football player
- Giorgi Makaridze (born 1990), Georgian footballer
- Giorgi Margvelashvili (born 1969), 4th President of Georgia
- Giorgi Matiashvili (born 1977), Georgian major general
- Giorgi Mchedlishvili (born 1992), Georgian footballer
- Giorgi Melikishvili (1918–2002), Georgian historian
- Giorgi Merebashvili (born 1986), Georgian footballer
- Giorgi Nadiradze (footballer) (born 1968), Georgian footballer
- Giorgi Nadiradze (cyclist) (born 1987), Georgian road bicycle racer
- Giorgi Navalovski (born 1986), Georgian footballer
- Giorgi Sanaia (1975–2001), Georgian journalist
- Giorgi Shermadini (born 1989), Georgian basketball player
- Giorgi Tsetsadze (born 1974), Georgian football manager
- Giorgi Tsmindashvili (born 1976), Georgian judoka

== See also ==
- Giorgi (surname), an Italian surname
- Georgy (name)
- Giorgio (name)
