= Giorgis Koutsourelis =

Greek composer

Composer Giorgis Koutsourelis was born at Kissamos, Crete in 1914. He composed "Armenohorianos Syrtos", whose theme formed the basis of the song written by Mikis Theodorakis popularly known as "Zorba's dance". He died in Kissamos in June 1994.
