= Francis Zorzi =

Member of the Venetian Zorzi family

Francis Zorzi (or Giorgi) (Italian: Francesco) (1337–1388), called Marchesotto, was a member of the Venetian Zorzi family and the Marquess of Bodonitsa in Central Greece from 1345 to his death.

Francis was the son of Guglielma Pallavicini and her husband Nicholas, the first Zorzi lord of Bodonitsa. His parents were embroiled in a dispute when Nicholas died in 1354 and Guglielma raised Francis to co-rule with her. The Republic of Venice was pleased that one of its own was again ruling Bodonitsa and happily negotiated for Francis and his mother with the Catalan Duchy of Athens.

Francis was a vassal of the Duke of Athens, to whom he was obligated to send an annual of tribute of four armed horses. Francis tried to maintain his independence from the Catalan vicar general of Athens and resisted the attempts of Peter IV of Aragon to establish his authority in Greece. He also supported Maria of Sicily against Peter for the Trinacrian throne. Indeed, through inheritance and "mercantile venture" he had obtained "a very fine estate" and great wealth, being the most important of Mary's princely supporters. Francis even made overtures to the Navarrese mercenaries of Juan de Urtubia before his death, perhaps encouraging their sack of Thebes. He took part in the Council of Thebes on 1 October 1373.

He died around 1388 and was succeeded by his eldest son Jacob under the regency of his widow Euphrosyne Sommaripa of the Cyclades. He had a daughter whom he married to a Serbian lord in Thessaly (the Serbs had established themselves there under Dušan), Stephen, a son of Simeon Uroš.

== Sources ==
- Miller, William (1908). "The Marquisate of Boudonitza (1204–1414)". Journal of Hellenic Studies. 28 (2): 234–249. doi:10.2307/624608. JSTOR 624608.
- Setton, Kenneth M.; Hazard, Harry W., eds. (1975). A History of the Crusades, Volume III: The Fourteenth and Fifteenth Centuries. Madison and London: University of Wisconsin Press. ISBN 0-299-06670-3.
- Setton, Kenneth M. Catalan Domination of Athens 1311–1380. Revised edition. Variorum: London, 1975.
