= Agostino Antonio Giorgi =

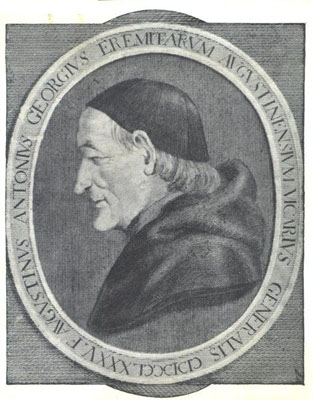

Agostino Antonio Giorgi (10 May 1711 – 4 May 1797) was an Italian Augustinian monk and scholar who produced the first description of the Tibetan language in Europe, the Alphabetum Tibetanum. He worked in the Bibliotheca Angelica in Vatican with the support of Pope Benedict XIV and published several catalogues.

== Life and work ==
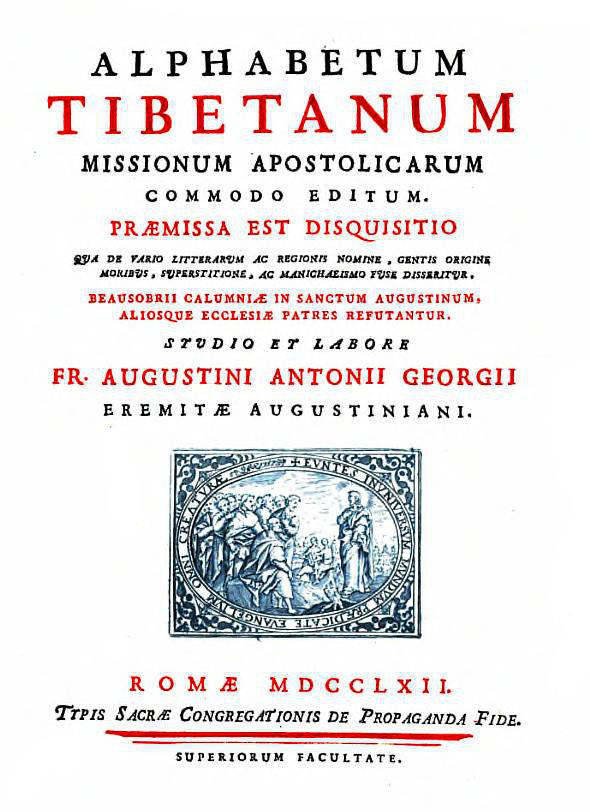
Cover of Alphabetum Tibetanum

Giorgi was born Francesco Maria to Antonio (1685–1723) and Antonia Semprini (1687–1767) in San Mauro di Romagna. At the age of twelve he lost his father and he took to reading and joined the order of the Augustinian Hermits in 1726. He took the name Agostino Antonio the next year. He passed exams in Latin and took courses in philosophy and metaphysics. In 1730 he studied physics, mathematics, meteorology, and metaphysics at Verona under Agostino Gioia (1695–1752). In 1733 he studied theology under Gianlorenzo Berti (1696–1766) and at the same time studied Hebrew, Aramaic and Syriac. He was ordained by cardinal Prospero Lambertini (1675–1758) (later Pope Benedict XIV) in 1738. He served as a rector at convents in L'Aquila, Siena, Florence, and Padua before moving to Bologna. In 1740, the newly appointed Pope Benedict wanted him in Rome as the chair of sacred writings at the Archiginnasio della Sapienza. Giorgi was appointed to the post in 1746. He produced a number of catalogues of the books in the library and he donated his own collections of manuscripts. In 1759 he published Alphabetum Tibetanum which introduced the alphabet, grammar and syntax of the Tibetan language. He was assisted by Cassiano da Macerata (1708–91) who lived in Lhasa for a year and a half along with Orazio della Penna Billi (1680–1745) and Costantino da Loro (1704–70) as part of the Tibet mission of the Capuchins. The text was ostensibly intended for missionaries. Modern Tibetan scholars consider it a poor work but it represented the early Western fascination with Tibet and this work was forgotten after the works of Ippolito Desideri and others became available. In 1742, Giorgi was visited by Casanova who noted that the entire city knew him for his erudition.

Giorgi attempted a history of Buddhism and gave wide publicity to the fable that Buddhism was related to the Classical God Mercury based on the word budha used for the planet Mercury.
