= Nicholas Zorzi (died 1354) =

Nicholas I Zorzi (or Giorgi) (Italian: Niccolò Zorzi; died 1354) was a Marquess of Bodonitsa, and the first member of the Zorzi family of Venice to hold the post, from 1335 to his death. In 1335, he married Guglielma Pallavicini, heiress of Bodonitsa and widow of Bartolommeo Zaccaria.

Though Nicholas was on good terms with Catalan Company then ruling the Duchy of Athens, he objected to the annual tribute of four destriers. Though he held the margraviate until his death and his descendants continued to rule it until the Ottoman conquest, his wife "tired of him" according to Setton.

He left three sons, Francis, James, and Nicholas, each of whom ruled the margraviate at some point or other.

== Sources ==
- Setton, Kenneth M. (general editor) A History of the Crusades: Volume III — The Fourteenth and Fifteenth Centuries. Harry W. Hazard, editor. University of Wisconsin Press: Madison, 1975.
- Setton, Kenneth M. Catalan Domination of Athens 1311–1380. Revised edition. Variorum: London, 1975.
