= DiGiorgio Corporation =

American agriculture company

Di Giorgio corporation was a fruit-growing corporation and eventual conglomerate in the 20th century. Once a vast company, owning much of California's central valley farm land, and multibillion-dollar corporation, a massive restructuring in the 1990s limited its breadth. Di Giorgio distributed food products under its White Rose brand name to New York, New Jersey and Connecticut.

== Founding ==
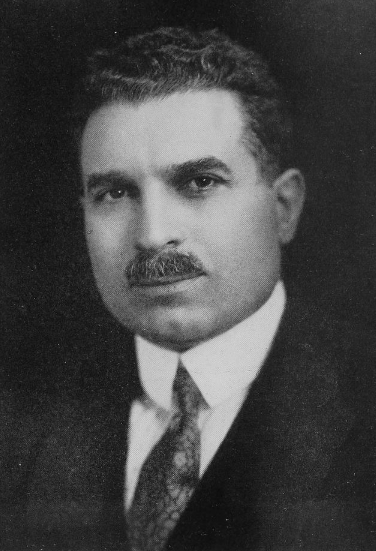
Joseph DiGiorgio

Joseph Di Giorgio (born Giuseppe Di Giorgio, 1874 in Cefalù, Sicily) immigrated to the United States in 1888, becoming a middleman for fruit sales. He founded the Baltimore Fruit Exchange in 1904 on borrowed money and eventually owned fruit exchanges in several major regions of the east coast. In 1911 was able to purchase the Earl Fruit Company, a California shipper to integrate further in the produce chain. In 1919, he bought 5845 acres of land outside Arvin in California's San Joaquin Valley. A year later, Di Giorgio founded Di Giorgio Fruit Co. His success came when he obtained water for the arid California land by drilling wells hundreds of feet deep. By 1929, just ten years after his original land purchase, Di Giorgio's company was the largest fruit-packing plant in the nation.

== Growth ==
The produce grown on the west coast became the main focus of the business. The end of Prohibition in 1933 saw Di Giorgio venture into the winery business, forming Del Vista Wine Co and bulk wine was shipped to the east coast in large tank cars. Di Giorgio was the largest wine producer in the country at that time though wine became a minor part of the corporation later. By 1946, the company occupied 33 square miles (85 km^{2}) of the San Joaquin Valley as well as land as far north as Washington state, in Marysville and south to the Mexican border. It was the largest grape, plum and pear grower in the world. Its revenue rose from $5.7 million in 1938 to $18.2 million in 1946, with Di Giorgio and his family owning 59% of the stock.

== Early setbacks ==
The shrinking and increasingly saline water table eventually forced Di Giorgio Co. to request federal irrigation water. However, it was disqualified by the US Bureau of Reclamation, which restricted its services to owners of less than 160 acres (0.65 km^{2}).

Ernesto Galarza also targeted Di Giorgio Co., organizing a strike from 1947 to 1950 and a boycott of the company's products. The strike lasted 30 months. Di Giorgio Co. eventually signed a contract with the United Farm Workers in 1966, after another long and highly publicized strike led by Cesar Chavez.

== Change in leadership & diversification ==
Joseph Di Giorgio died in 1951 and his nephew, Robert Di Giorgio rose to leadership, becoming president in 1962. By 1967, the agricultural portion of the business accounted for less than 2% of revenue and "Fruit" was dropped from the company's name. Its acquisitions included S&W Fine Foods, TreeSweet, White Rose, Serv-A-Portion (distributor of condiment packets for fast food), Los Angeles Drugs, Peter Carando Inc (Italian-style meats), Sun Aire Airlines and Las Plumas Lumber Co. Di Giorgio also became invested in land development across California. In 1965, assets had reached $82.9 million and sales had passed $100 million. Di Giorgio Co. ranked 9th in rate of sales growth in the nation at that time. Its products and services ranged from grocery distribution, fruit juices, campers, lumber, housing components, pharmaceuticals, wine and, of course, fruit. Modest exports were mainly to Europe and Japan.

== Decline ==
By the late 1970s, Di Giorgio's sales had reached $1 billion. The company was seen to lack focus due to the large scope of operations and the recession of the 1970s had negative effects on the camper and lumber businesses. Peripheral companies were sold off. Robert Di Giorgio eventually stepped down as chairperson in 1982 turning the company over to Peter Scott, former Chief Financial Officer.

The late '80s saw hostile takeover attempts by the Gabelli Group Inc. Restructuring began in 1984. Sun Aire was sold to SkyWest Airlines; TreeSweet, Allied Distributing Co., Los Angeles Drug Co., Serv-A-Portion and much of the real estate outside of Borrego Springs was sold as well. However, in doing so, it left Di Giorgio only two lines of business: food processing/distribution and building materials. In 1988, management enacted a $70 million, $21-a-share buyback offer. Trial lawyer and New Jersey native Arther Goldberg attempted to gain control of the remains, interested in the White Rose Company. By 1990 he had taken control of the company, moving the headquarters from San Francisco to Somerset, New Jersey. All but White Rose division were eventually sold off by 1994.

== Legacy ==
Di Giorgio Elementary School founded in 1897 and is the oldest school in Arvin. Following the burning of the original schoolhouse, agricultural entrepreneur Joseph Di Giorgio would donate $150,000 and 40 acres of land on Christmas Eve, 1945. Rockpile School would then change its name to Di Giorgio School to honor the gift.

The White Rose Company, successor to the Di Giorgio Company, changed hands and finally declared bankruptcy in late 2013.

However, Di Giorgio a town in the California San Joaquin Valley still bears the name of the once vast farming empire. The Di Giorgio family donated money to Cefalu, Sicily, which contains a "Di Giorgio Technical Institute" and "Plaza Di Giorgio".
