= Lechang East railway station =

Railway station in Shaoguan, Guangdong, China

Lechang East 乐昌东
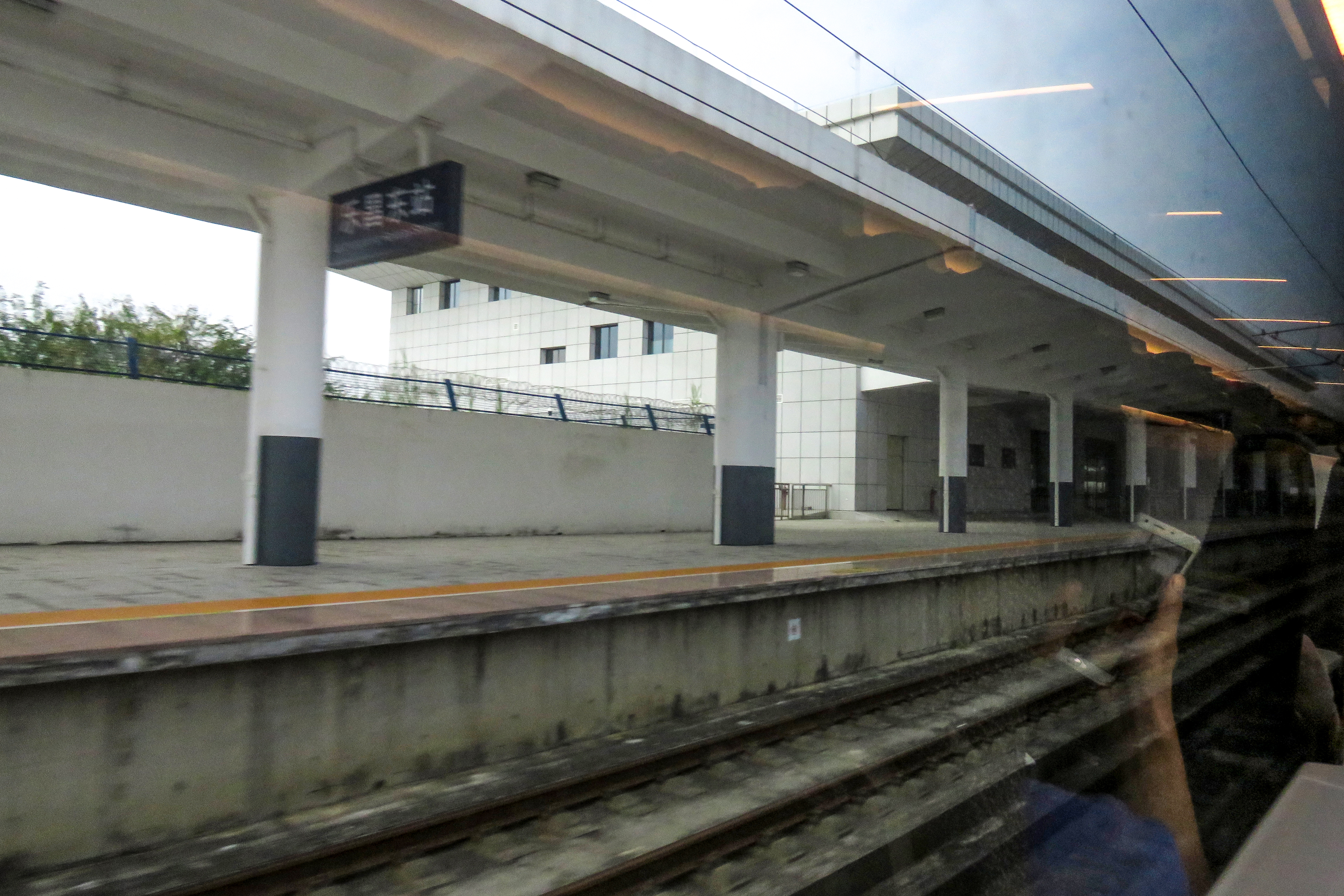

General information
- Other names: Lechangdong
- Location: Lechang, Shaoguan, Guangdong Province, China; China
- System: High Speed Rail Station
- Line: Beijing–Guangzhou high-speed railway
- Train operators: China Railway Guangzhou Group

Services
Preceding station	China Railway High-speed	Following station
Chenzhou West towards Wuhan	Wuhan–Guangzhou high-speed railway	Shaoguan towards Guangzhou South
Location

Lechang East (Chinese: 乐昌东站) is a railway station in Lechang, Shaoguan, Guangdong Province, China. The station opened on 1 May 2017. It is on the Beijing–Guangzhou high-speed railway. It is also the last station before the train goes across the border to Hunan Province.
