= Rosa Maria Di Giorgi =

Italian politician (born 1955)

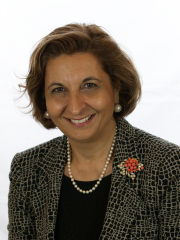
Rosa Maria Di Giorgi in 2013.

Rosa Maria Di Giorgi (born 11 August 1955) is an Italian politician.

== Political career ==
Di Giorgi was born in Reggio Calabria in 1955. She was a member of The Daisy between 2002 and 2007.

She was elected to the Italian Senate in the 2013 general election for the Democratic Party.

She was elected vice president of the Senate on 22 February 2017, replacing Valeria Fedeli.

She was elected to the Chamber of Deputies in the 2018 general election. She won the constituency of Florence-Scandicci with 56,565 votes (43%).
