= Nicholas Zorzi (died 1436) =

Nicholas ΙΙΙ Zorzi or Giorgi (Italian: Niccolò) was the Marquess of Bodonitsa, a member of the Zorzi family of the Republic of Venice, from 1416 to 1436, though the title was purely nominal by then. Before becoming marquess in an exchange with his nephew Nicholas II, he was the baron of Carystus (from 1410). He was a son of Guglielma Pallavicini and Marquess Nicholas I Zorzi.

He spent most of his adult career acting as a functionary of the Republic of Venice. He was an ambassador to the courts of Sigismund, Holy Roman Emperor and King of Hungary, and Murad II, the Ottoman sultan. He was poisoned, perhaps by Murad's men, in 1436.

His daughter, Chiara, married Nerio II of Athens.

== Sources ==
- Miller, William (1908). "The Marquisate of Boudonitza (1204–1414)". Journal of Hellenic Studies. 28 (2): 234–249. doi:10.2307/624608. JSTOR 624608.
- Setton, Kenneth M. (general editor) A History of the Crusades: Volume III — The Fourteenth and Fifteenth Centuries. Harry W. Hazard, editor. University of Wisconsin Press: Madison, 1975.
