= Zorzi =

Medieval noble family of Venetian origin

According to family tradition, Marsilio Zorzi adopted this design as the Zorzi coat of arms after the reconquest of Curzola in 1256

The Zorzi or Giorgi was a noble family of Venetian origin. They thrived in the Late Middle Ages, especially in the remnants of the Latin Empire in Greece, where they controlled the Margraviate of Bodonitsa and through marriage the Duchy of Athens until the Ottoman conquest.

Under Nicholas I they took control of Bodonitsa in 1335. Nicholas was succeeded by Francis, who governed the margraviate for almost forty years. In 1414, Nicholas II was defeated and the Turks took control of Bodonitsa, nonetheless Nicholas III continued to employ the title and garner the prestige that came with it. He married his daughter Chiara to the duke of Athens, Nerio II. She was to govern the duchy on behalf of her young son Francesco I.

== Gallery ==
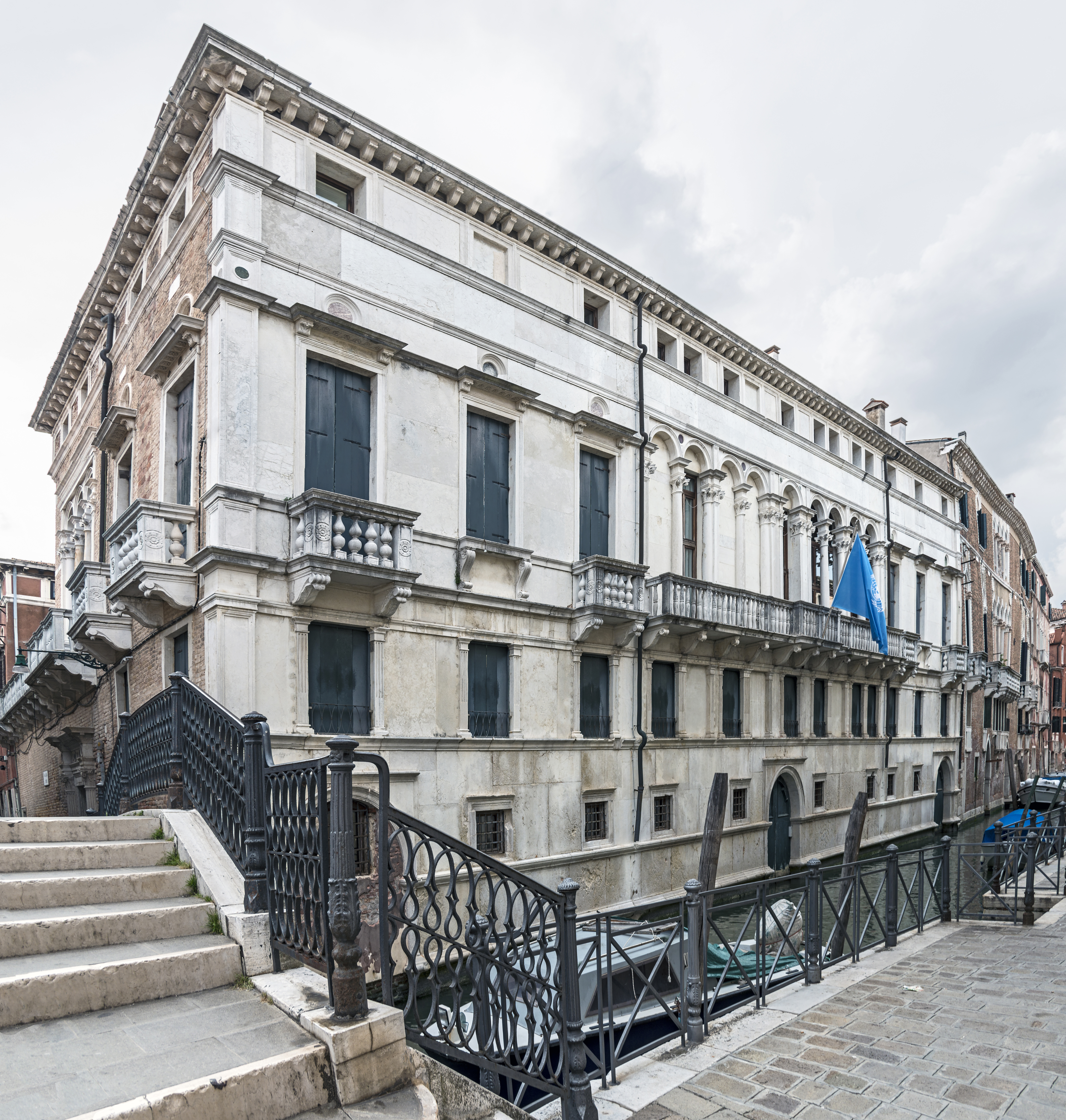
Palazzo Zorzi Galeoni

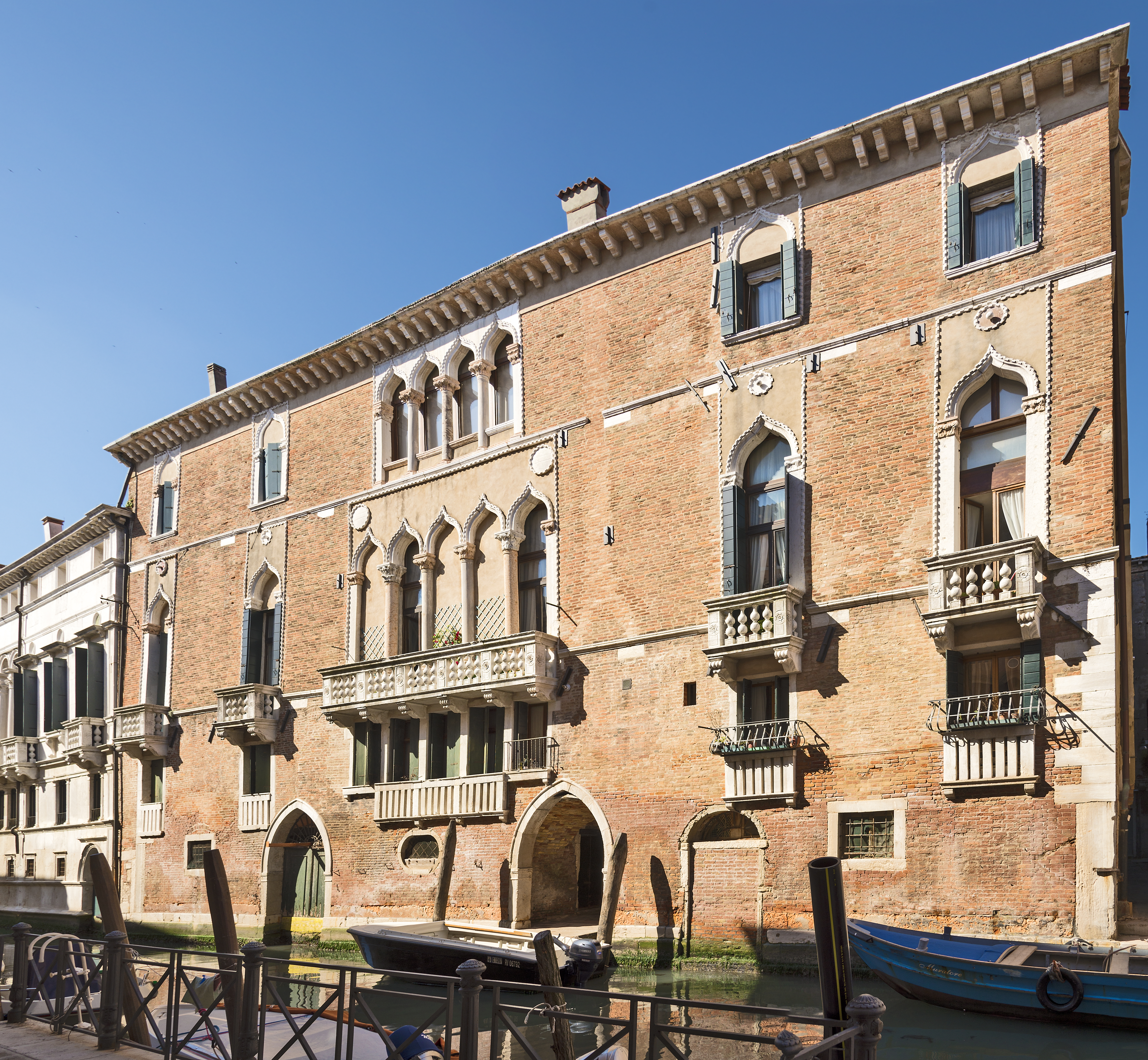
Palazzo Zorzi Bon

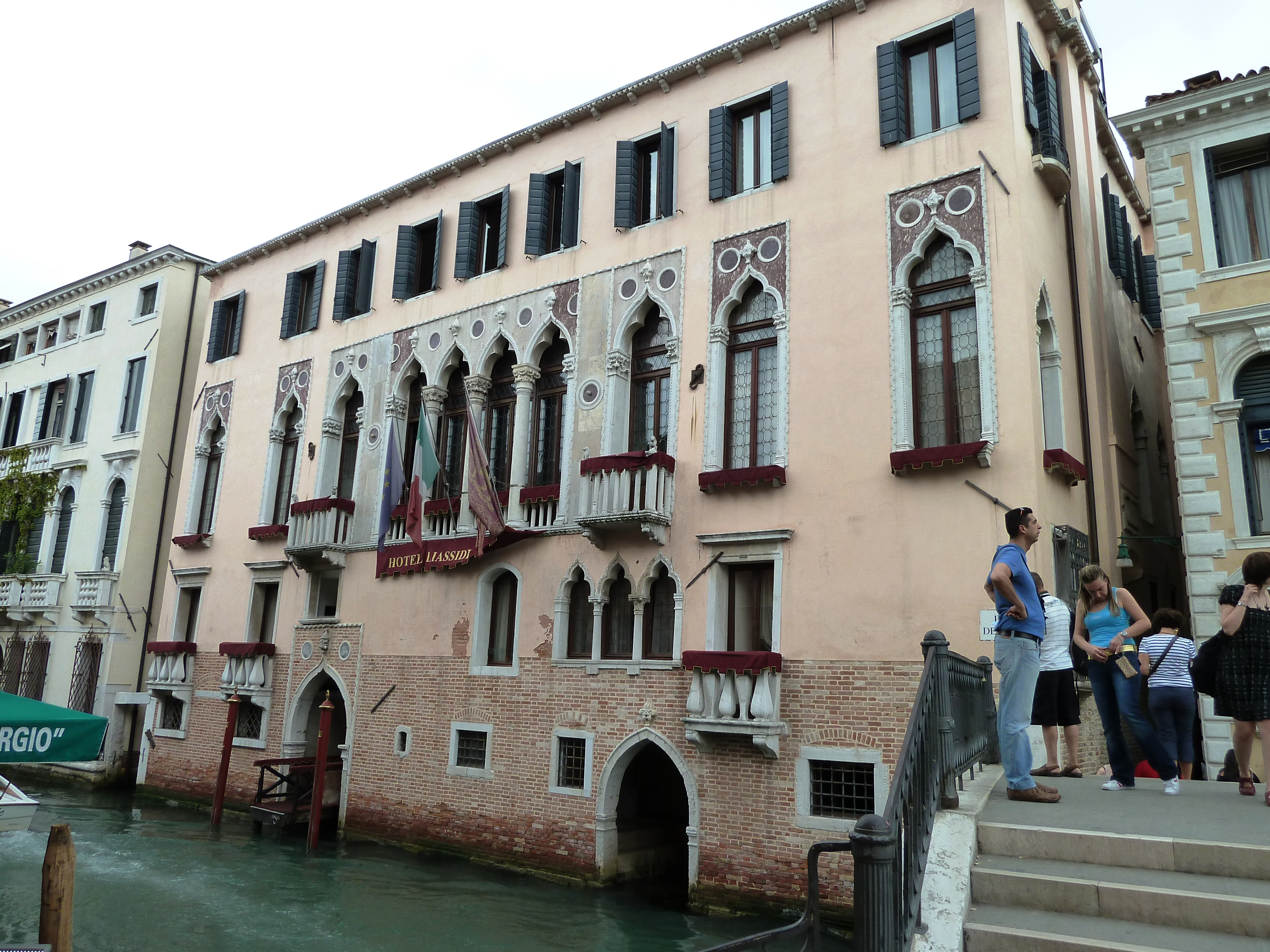
Palazzo Zorzi-Liassidi

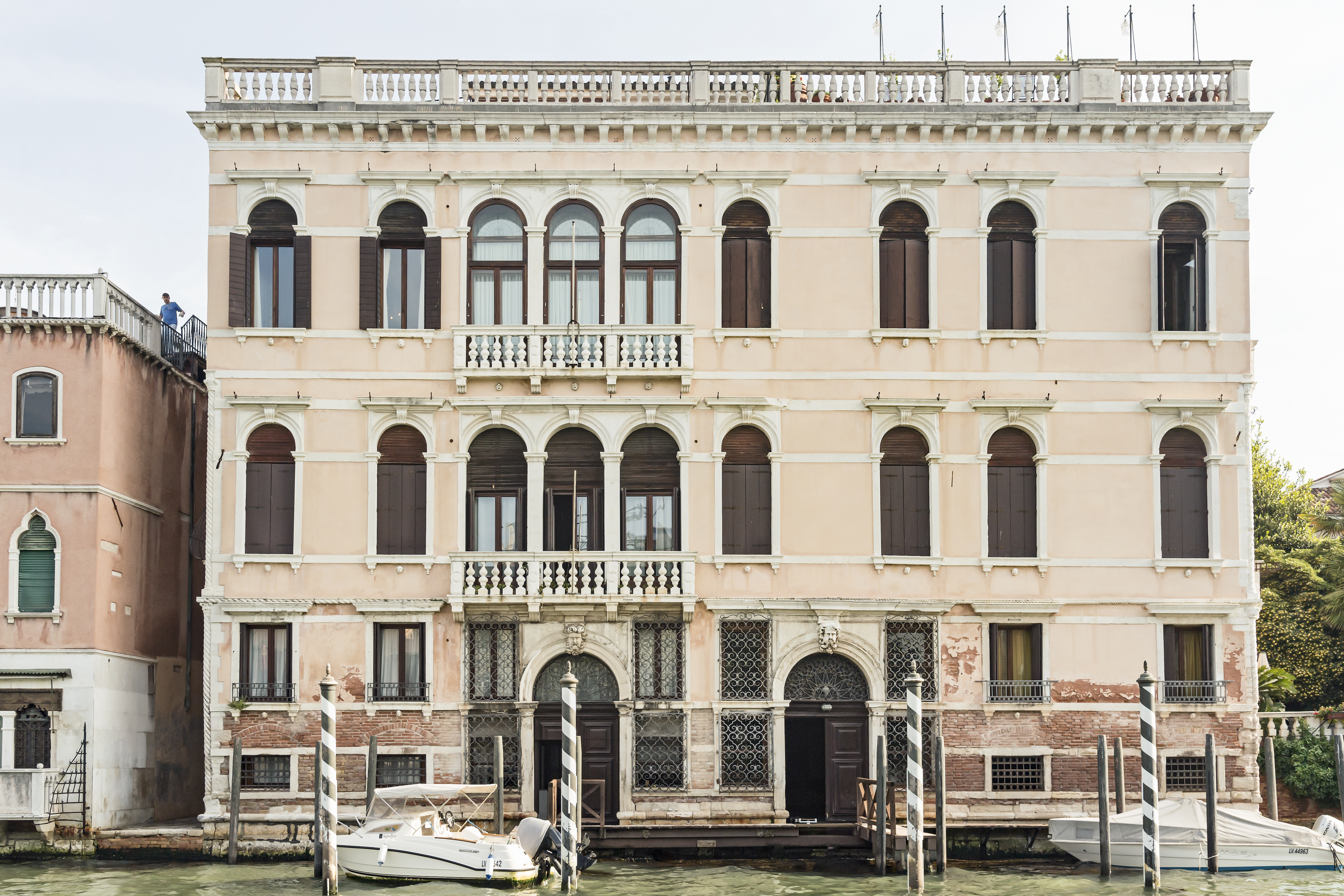
Palazzo Correr Contarini Zorzi
