= Nicholas II Zorzi =

Nicholas II Zorzi or Giorgi (Italian: Niccolò) was the Margrave of Bodonitsa, a member of the Zorzi family of the Republic of Venice, from 1410 to 1414. He was the last Venetian margrave to actually rule before the Ottoman Turkish conquest.

He was the son of either Francis or Jacob, brothers and successive margraves of Bodonitsa. He succeeded the latter on his death. He was a prisoner at the court of the Sultan Mehmet I in Adrianople, but was released in accordance with a treaty with Venice. He then ruled for a short while before his territory, which guarded the important pass of Thermopylae, was conquered on 20 June 1414. He then fled to Venice, but was restored to power by another treaty in 1416. However, he ceded his rights to Bodonitsa to his uncle Nicholas III in return for the rectorate of Pteleon. The margravial title was purely nominal after that.

== Sources ==
- Miller, William (1908). "The Marquisate of Boudonitza (1204–1414)". Journal of Hellenic Studies. 28 (2): 234–249. doi:10.2307/624608. JSTOR 624608.
- Setton, Kenneth M. (general editor) A History of the Crusades: Volume III — The Fourteenth and Fifteenth Centuries. Harry W. Hazard, editor. University of Wisconsin Press: Madison, 1975.
