= Sylke von Gaza =

German painter

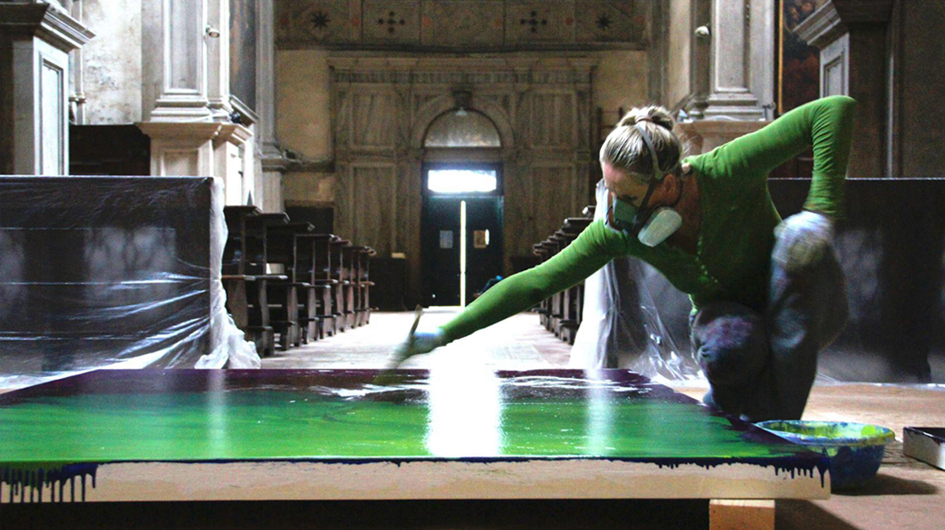
- Sylke von Gaza painting inside San Fantin church in Venice, 2014
- Born: 1 July 1966 (age 59); Hamburg, Germany
- Education: Academy of Fine Arts Munich
- Known for: Painting
- Notable work: Red Veil Paintings, Grey Veil Paintings, Lucifero
- Awards: Meisterschülerin (2007)
- Website: vongaza.com

Sylke von Gaza (* 1 July 1966 in Hamburg as Sylke von Gazen genannt Gaza) is a German artist. First and foremost an abstract painter, she also pursues numerous projects that investigate the effect and impact of painting in architectural spaces and the process of painting including site-specific settings. Von Gaza lives and works in Munich, Venice and Zurich.

== Life ==
The Hamburg-born artist Sylke von Gaza was first taken to Italy as a three-year-old by her great-grandmother, whom she accompanied on long journeys to Venice and the Emilia-Romagna. It was during those childhood visits to the churches of Ravenna, Assisi and Venice, to name but a few, that she first came to appreciate painting and architecture. The experience made a lasting impression and continues to inspire her work to this day.

Sylke von Gaza's first university degree is in engineering. Later, as a student of painting at the Academy of Fine Arts in Munich from 2002 to 2007 under the Irish painter Sean Scully, she found herself drawn to the Old Masters and Abstract expressionism. She completed her studies at the Academy of Fine Arts in Munich in 2007, graduating with a Meisterschüler diploma ("summa cum laude").

== Work ==
Netherlandish and Italian Renaissance painting has always been a key source of inspiration for Sylke von Gaza. With her large-scale abstract oil paintings she positions herself within the tradition of the Old Masters without, however, referencing them directly in her formal language. Oscillating between past and present, Venice provides an ideal creative environment for the artist, whose works not only probe the questions of tradition and identity in painting, but also provoke a discussion of the intrinsic value of art and society.

Her work thus far can be divided into different strands. Her principal body of work consists of Early Works, individual works, themed groups of works, site-specific works and the series of Veil Paintings, among them the Grey Veil Paintings and Red Veil Paintings.

In Sylke von Gaza's creative practice, the veil, the metaphor for transcendence and permeability, plays a central role. The ability to disclose by concealing, to render visible by shrouding – the artist has internalised this fundamental potential of painting and made it central to her work.

Since 2012, the artist has been working on projects that focus on painting in sacred spaces, primarily in Venetian churches. Since 2013, in collaboration with Curia Patriarchale di Venezia, von Gaza has been painting in the Chiesa San Fantin (2014), the Chiesa San Lio (2015), the Cappella Santissima Trinità (2016).

A classification in the art historical narrative took place in 2016 on the occasion of the museum exhibition Behind the Curtain. Concealment and Revelation since the Renaissance at the Museum Kunstpalast Düsseldorf, curated by Beat Wismer and Prof. Claudia Blümle. The thematic show featured two large Veil Paintings by the artist. Other works by Sylke von Gaza are part of museum collections at the Sprengel Museum Hannover, the Städtische Galerie im Lenbachhaus Munich and the Museum of the Diocese of Venice, among others.

To mark the Venice Biennale of 2015, the Venetian Curia commissioned von Gaza with a site-specific work for the Renaissance chapel of the Gussoni family in the church of San Lio. Working on site inside the chapel during the Beyond the Veil project, the artist created the Gussoni Red Veil Paintings Triptych, which is now permanently installed in the Renaissance chapel designed around 1479 by Tullio and Pietro Lombardo. The famous Venetian painter of Veduta Giovanni Antonio Canal (1697–1768), better known as Canaletto, is buried in the chapel.

At the invitation of the Seminario Patriarcale di Venezia von Gaza was creating the project Il Nido. A Pilgrimage towards Equilibrium for the Padiglioni Paralleli in the Basilica Santa Maria della Salute to coincide with the 57th International Art Exhibition La Biennale di Venezia 2017. In spring 2019, the installation Il Nido travelled on to Gedächtniskirche in Berlin.

== Recognition ==
- 2007: Meisterschülerin in Fine Arts at the Akademie der Bildenden Künste München under Prof. Sean Scully.
- 2015: Work commission for Gussoni Renaissance Chapel by Curia Patriarcale di Venezia
- 2017: Invitation to Padiglioni Paralleli for the 57th Venice Biennale by Curia Patriarcale di Venezia

== Exhibitions (selection) ==
- 2024: Colour Turns Me On, Gallery Beck & Eggeling, Düsseldorf
- 2023: INTRO | RETRO | SPECTIVE, Sotheby's, Hamburg (solo)
- 2021: BIG! Large-Format Works from the Sprengel Museum Hannover, curated by Reinhard Spieler, Sprengel Museum Hannover
- 2019: Early Works, Palazzo Martinengo Fortuny, Venedig (solo)
- 2019: Il Nido in der Gedächtniskirche, Berlin, (solo)
- 2019: Velvet & Paper, Galerie Biedermann, München (solo)
- 2018: Il Nido inside Basilica Santa Maria della Salute, Venice (solo)
- 2018: Gabriel & Lucifero. The most precious Pigment of Renaissance Venice, Palazzo Contarini Polignac, Venice (solo)
- 2018: BIAS Biennale Internazionale 2018, Museo Riso, Capella dell' Incoronazione, Palermo
- 2017: Il Nido. A Pilgrimage towards Equilibrium, project start for Padiglioni Paralleli of Curia Patriarcale di Venezia and glasswork with Berengo Studio, Murano, during 57th Venice Biennale, at Basilica della Salute, Osservatorio del Seminario Patriarcale, Punta della Dogana, Venice (solo)
- 2017: Summertime: Brüning, Erben, von Gaza, Huidobro, Merschmann, Münch, Gallery Hans Strelow, Düsseldorf
- 2017: 52nd Art Cologne, Gallery Hans Strelow, Cologne
- 2016/17: Behind the Curtain. Concealment and Revelation since the Renaissance. From Titian to Cristo, curated by Beat Wismer and Prof. Dr. Claudia Blümle, Museum Kunstpalast Düsseldorf
- 2016: Private View Villa von Schulthess-Bodmer, Zürich (solo)
- 2016: Fabrica Ecclesiae, Museo Diocesano d'Arte Sacra Sant' Apollonia, San Marco, Venice
- 2015: Beyond the Veil, project with and commission for Curia Patriarcale di Venezia during 56th Venice Biennale, Chiesa San Lio, Venice (solo)
- 2014: Power of Glass, Hofglasmalerei Gustav van Treeck, Munich
- 2013: Handwerk und Kirche, Gallery Handwerk of Chamber of Commerce of Munich and Upper Bavaria in collaboration with Erzbischöfliches Ordinariat München, Carmelite Church of St. Nicholas, Munich
- 2013: Spirituality in Painting, Gallery Art Consult, Munich (solo)
- 2012: Positionswechsel, BayWa, Munich
- 2011: Light & Painting, Palazzo Ca' del Duca, Venice (solo)
- 2010: Jahresgaben, Munich Art Society, Munich
- 2009: The Process of Creation, Rich Gallery, London (solo)
- 2009: Malerei, Gallery Biedermann, Munich (solo)
- 2008: Jahresausstellung des 15. Kunstpreises, Aichach Art Society, Aichach
- 2007: Jahresausstellung, Traunstein Art Society, Traustein
- 2007: Diplomausstellung Abschlussklasse Prof. Sean Scully, Akademie der Bildenden Künste München, Munich

== Permanent Installations ==
- since 2015: Gussoni Red Veil Triptych, Gussoni Renaissance Chapel, Chiesa San Lio, Venice

== Public & private collections (selection) ==
- Städtische Galerie im Lenbachhaus, Munich
- Museo Diocesano d'Arte Sacra Sant' Apollonia, San Marco, Venice
- Sammlung Schnetkamp, Düsseldorf/Oldenburg
- Collezione Seminario Patriarcale di Venezia, Venice
- Sammlung Hackenberg, Munich
- Sprengel Museum Hannover, Hannover

== Bibliography ==
- Reinhard Spieler: BIG! Large-Format Works from the Sprengel Museum Hannover, exhibition catalogue Sprengel Museum Hannover, Hannover 2021.
- Tim Ackermann: Eier und Eiermann - das Kunstwerk "Il Nido" gastiert in der Berliner Gedächtniskirche, Weltkunst 8. Juni 2019, Berlin/Hamburg 2019.
- Julian Bruno Vogel: Himmel über Berlin. Die Installation Il Nido der deutschen Künstlerin Sylke von Gaza macht Halt im Alten Turm der Gedächtniskirche zu Berlin, Zeitkunst (5/2019), Neu-Isenburg, 2019.
- Ein Nest für die Gedächtniskirche, Berliner Morgenpost 29/4/2019, Berlin 2019.
- Tim Jäger: Das Nest in der Gedächtniskirche, RBB Abendschau, ARD 27/4/2019, Berlin 2019.
- Tim Ackermann: Il Nido - Venedigs geheimes Nest, Weltkunst 8. December 2017, Berlin/Hamburg 2017.
- Guido Brivio: Mysterium Coniunctionis. Gabriel & Lucifero by Sylke von Gaza, Venezia & Torino 2017.
- Alan Jones: „As High as the Eagle“ - Sylke von Gaza’s Installation „Il Nido“ in Venice, Venezia 2017.
- Petra Schaefer: Hoch über den Kirchendächern von Venedig. Die deutsche Künstlerin Sylke von Gaza präsentiert die Installation "Il Nido", Zeitkunst (11/2017), Neu-Isenburg 2017.
- Irmgard Bernrieder: Dem Blick entrückte Huldigung, Textcluster 29. November 2017, Brüggen 2017.
- Beat Wismer, Claudia Blümle (Ed.): Hinter dem Vorhang. Verhüllung und Enthüllung seit der Renaissance – von Tizian bis Christo, with contributions by Horst Bredekamp, Georges Didi-Huberman, Wolfgang Kemp, Roland Krischel, Oskar Bätschmann, Lia Bertram, Dortje Fink, Vincent von Frankenberg, Klaus Krüger, Saskia C. Quené, Patrik Reuterswärd, Julia Ryll, Barbara Schnellewald, Beate Söntgen, Victor I. Stoichita and Gerhard Wolf, exhibition catalogue Museum Kunstpalast Düsseldorf, Hirmer, Munich 2016, ISBN 978-3-7774-2646-4.
- Helga Meister: Im Ehrenhof wird der Vorhang gelüftet, Westdeutsche Zeitung WZ 30 September 2017, Wuppertal, Krefeld, Düsseldorf 2016.
- Thomas Köster: "Hinter dem Vorhang" im Museum Kunstpalast, Westdeutscher Rundfunk WDR 30 September 2016, Cologne 2016.
- Tim Ackermann: Venedig wird abstrakt, Weltkunst 106 (10/2015), Berlin/Hamburg 2015.
- Gianmatteo Caputo: Beyond the Veil: Red Veil Paintings nella Chiesa di San Lio, Uffici Beni Culturali & Turismo della Curia Patriarcale di Venezia UBC, Venice 2015.
- Gustav van Treeck (Ed.): Power of Glass, exhibition catalogue, Munich 2014.
- Maurits J. Sinninghe Damsté: Sylke von Gaza's paintings: Sacraments of a Deeper Reality, Groningen-Leeuwarden 2013.
- Laura Schwarz: Schichtarbeit, Architectural Digest AD (10/2013), Munich 2013.
- Jolanda Drexler: Sylke von Gaza in Conversation with Jolanda Drexler, Artology 2 (2013), Munich 2013.
- Florian Seidl (Ed.): Jahresgaben 2010, Kunstverein München e.V., Munich 2010.
- Steven Rich (Ed.): Sylke von Gaza: Red Veil Paintings. The Process of Creation, London 2009.
- Petra Giloy-Hirtz: From the Grey to the Colourful. Interview with Sylke von Gaza, Munich 2008.
- Martin H. Schmidt: Die Schleier der Sylke von Gaza – Who is afraid of grey, white and red?, Kronberg 2007.
