= Pietro Antonio Novelli =

Italian painter

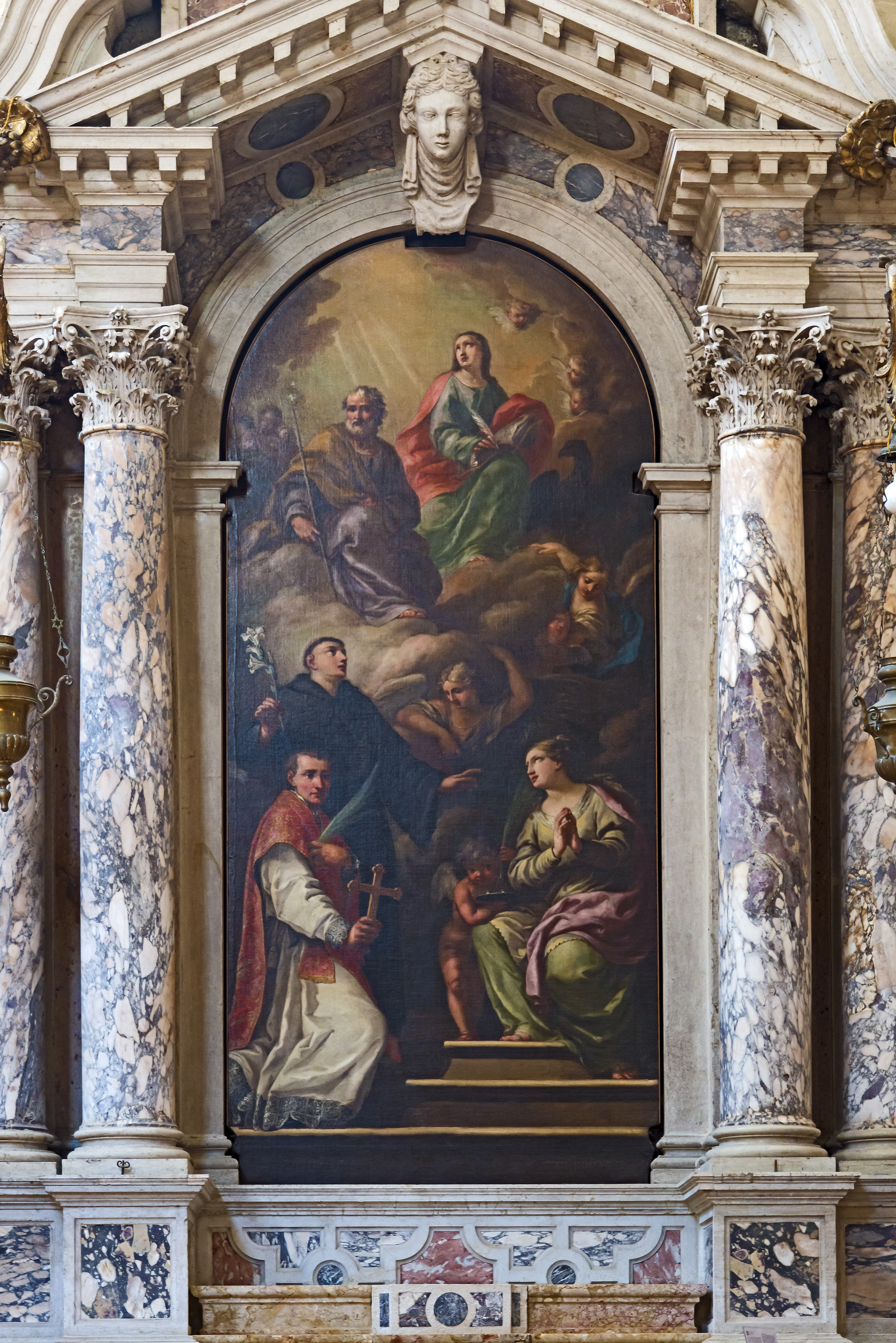
Holy Father with Saints (1779), Church of San Lio, Venice

Pietro Antonio Novelli (1729–1804) was an Italian painter and engraver.

== Biography ==
Novelli trained with the Venetian painter Jacopo Amigoni. In 1768, he was accepted as a member of the Accademia di Belle Arti in Venice. Novelli produced altarpieces and frescoes throughout northern Italy. Some of his commissions came from Catherine the Great. He moved to Rome around 1779, where he remained for over 20 years. He later returned to Venice, where he died in 1804. His memoirs were published posthumously in 1834.

== Works ==
Drawing, Colour and Invention, (1769) - Gallerie Accademia, Venice

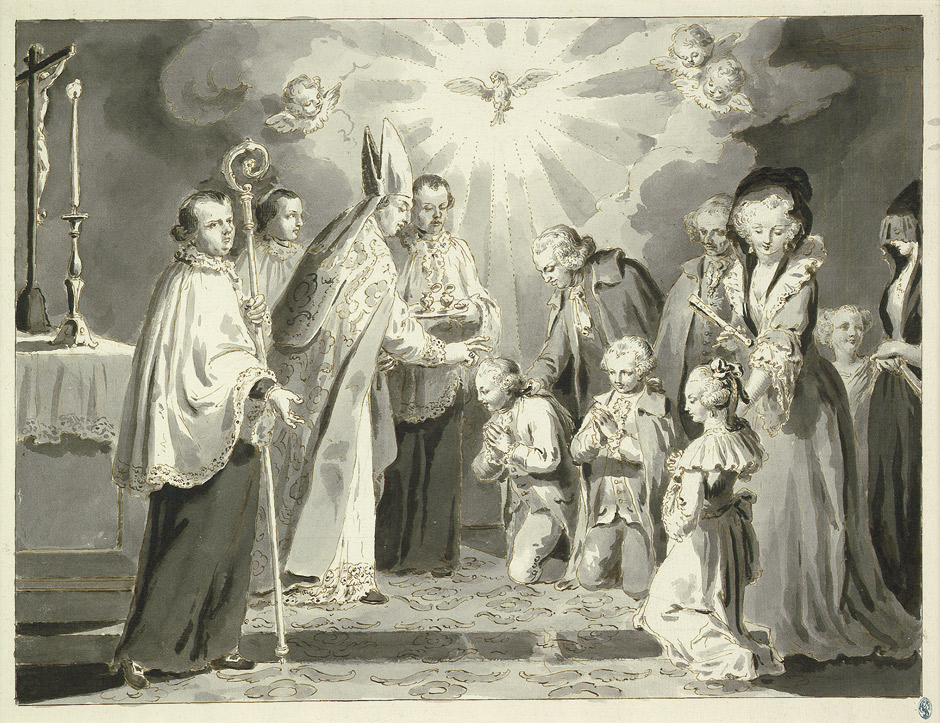
The Seven Sacraments: Confirmation (1779) engraving by Novelli

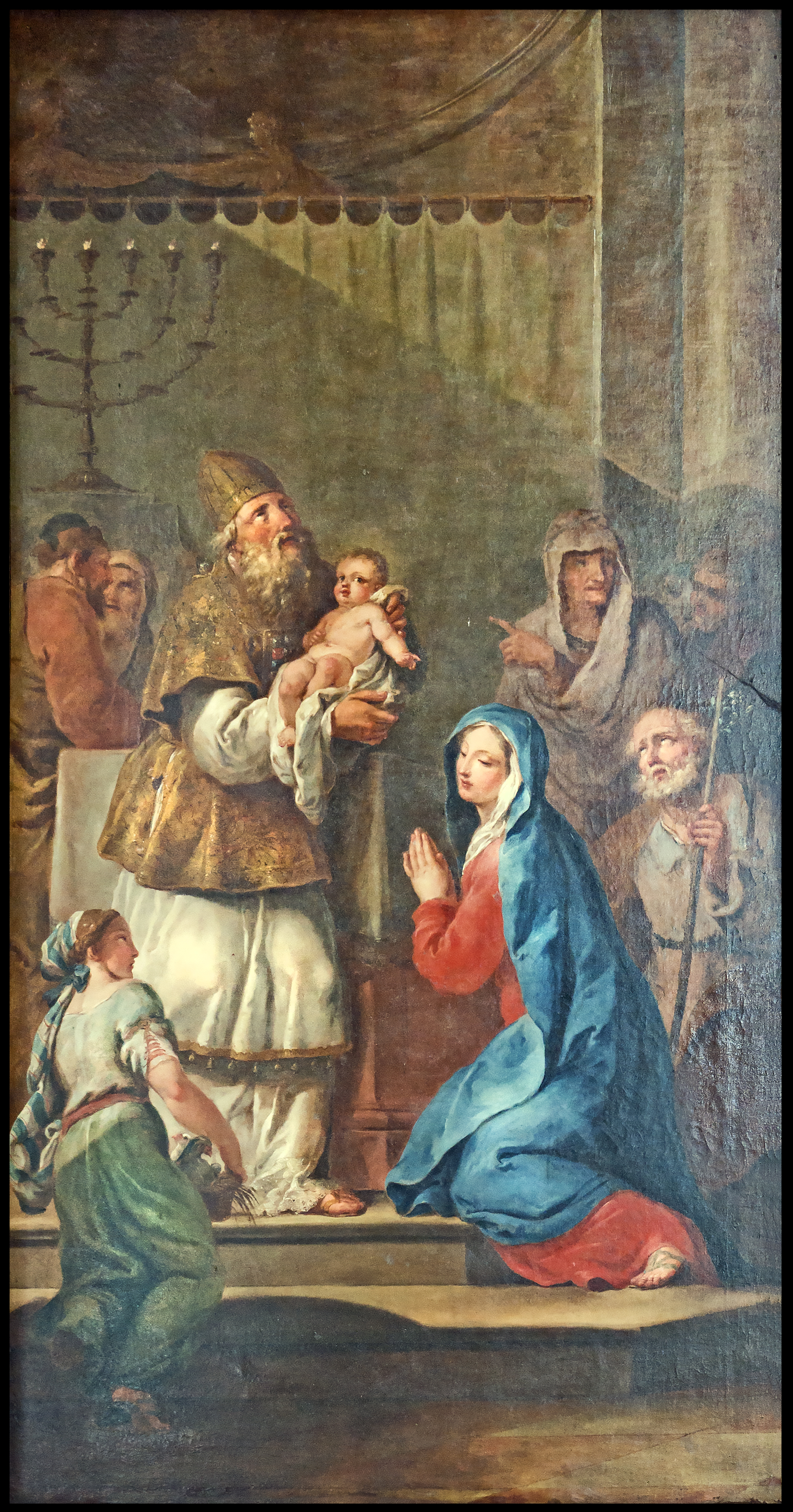
Purification of the Virgin Mary (1804), Church of San Geremia, Venice
