= San Lio, Venice =

Church in Castello, Venice

San Lio
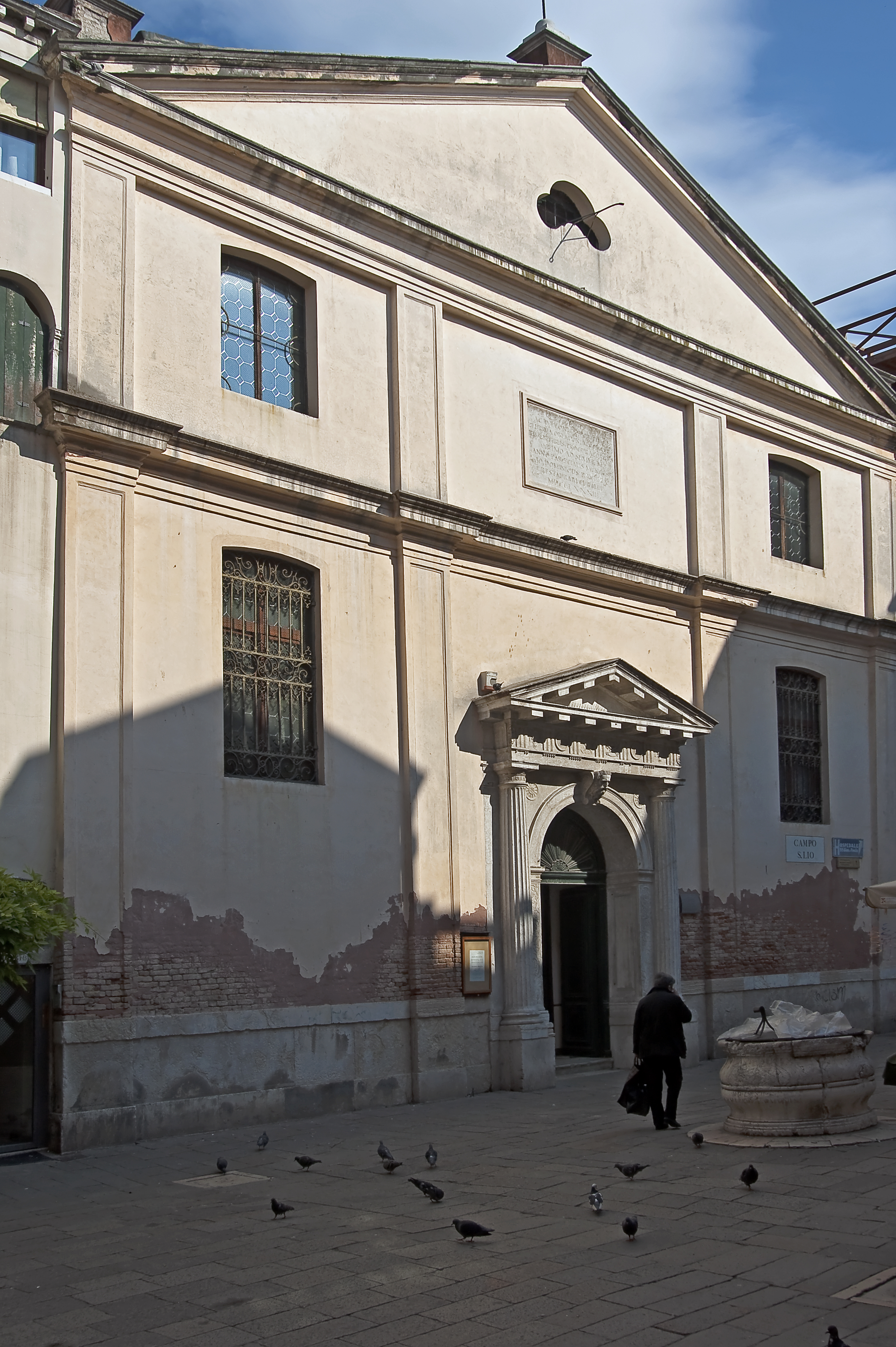
- San Lio in Venice

- Location within Venice Location within Italy

Religion
- Affiliation: Roman Catholic
- Province: Venice

Location
- Location: Venice, Italy
- Interactive map of San Lio
- Coordinates: 45°26′15″N 12°20′19″E

Architecture
- Completed: 9th century

San Lio is a church located on the campo of the same name in the sestiere of Castello.

== History ==
Built in the 9th century by the patrician family of the Badoer it was first named St Catherine of Alexandria. In 1054, it was rededicated to St Leone (San Lio in venetian dialect) in honor of pope Leo IX, who had favored the cause of Venice in a 1043 dispute between the Doge Contarini of Venice, the Patriarch of Aquileia over who had supremacy over the region of Grado.

The painter Canaletto was baptized and buried at this church.

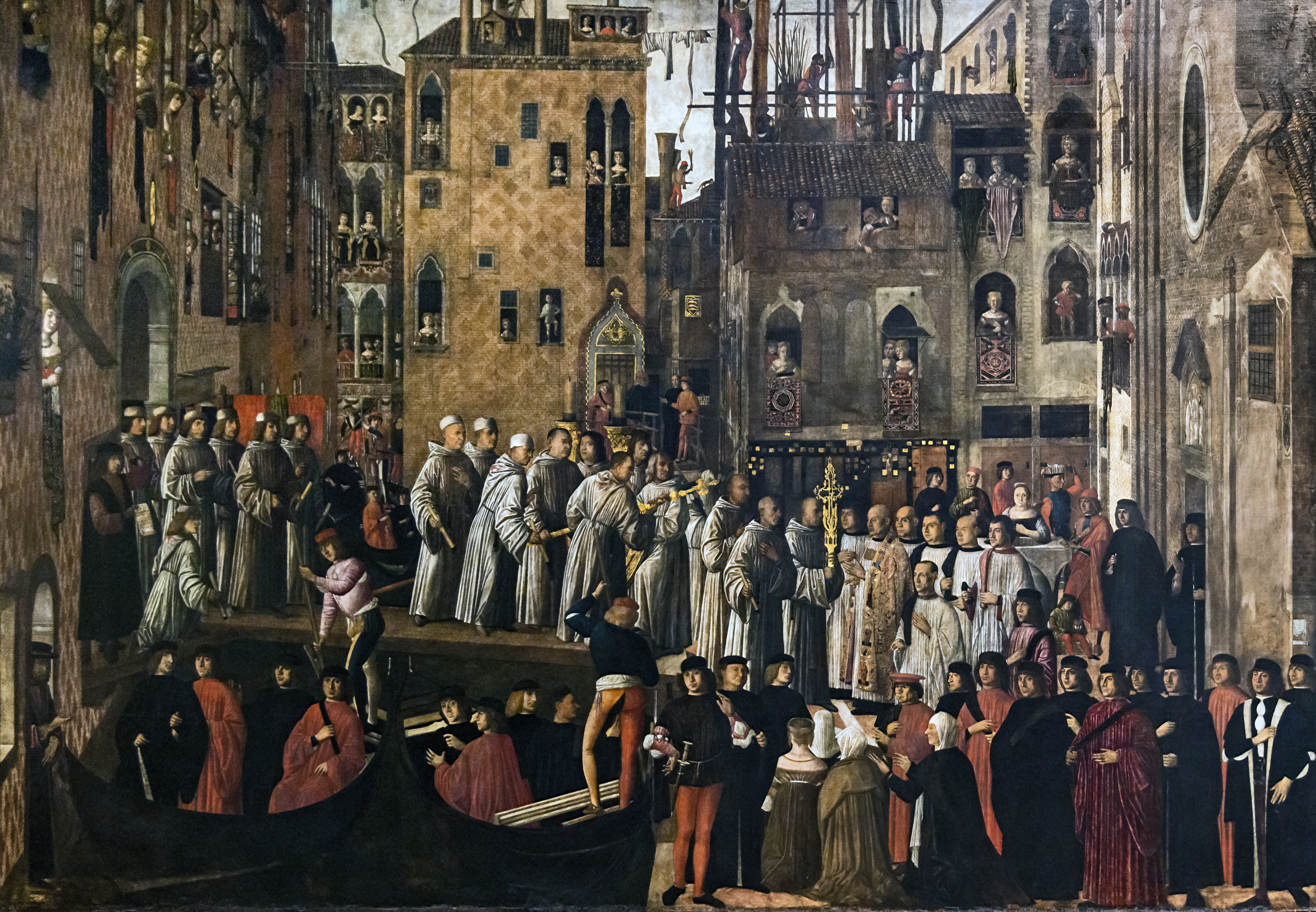
Miracle of the relic of the Holy Cross in Campo San Lio by Giovanni Mansueti, 1494

== Architecture and Interior Decoration ==
The presbytery was rebuilt in the 15th century, and the church underwent a major reconstruction and design in 1783. The latest reconstruction led to a single nave; the bell-tower was taken down. The interior retains some paintings and sculpture including:

- St James the Major (c. 1540) by Titian
- Angels and virtues by Giandomenico Tiepolo
- St Leo in Glory by Giandomenico Tiepolo
- Dead Christ upheld by Saints and Angels (main altarpiece) by Jacopo Palma il Giovane
- Above the entrance to the chapel to the left is the funeral monument to Andrea Pisani, who died in 1718.
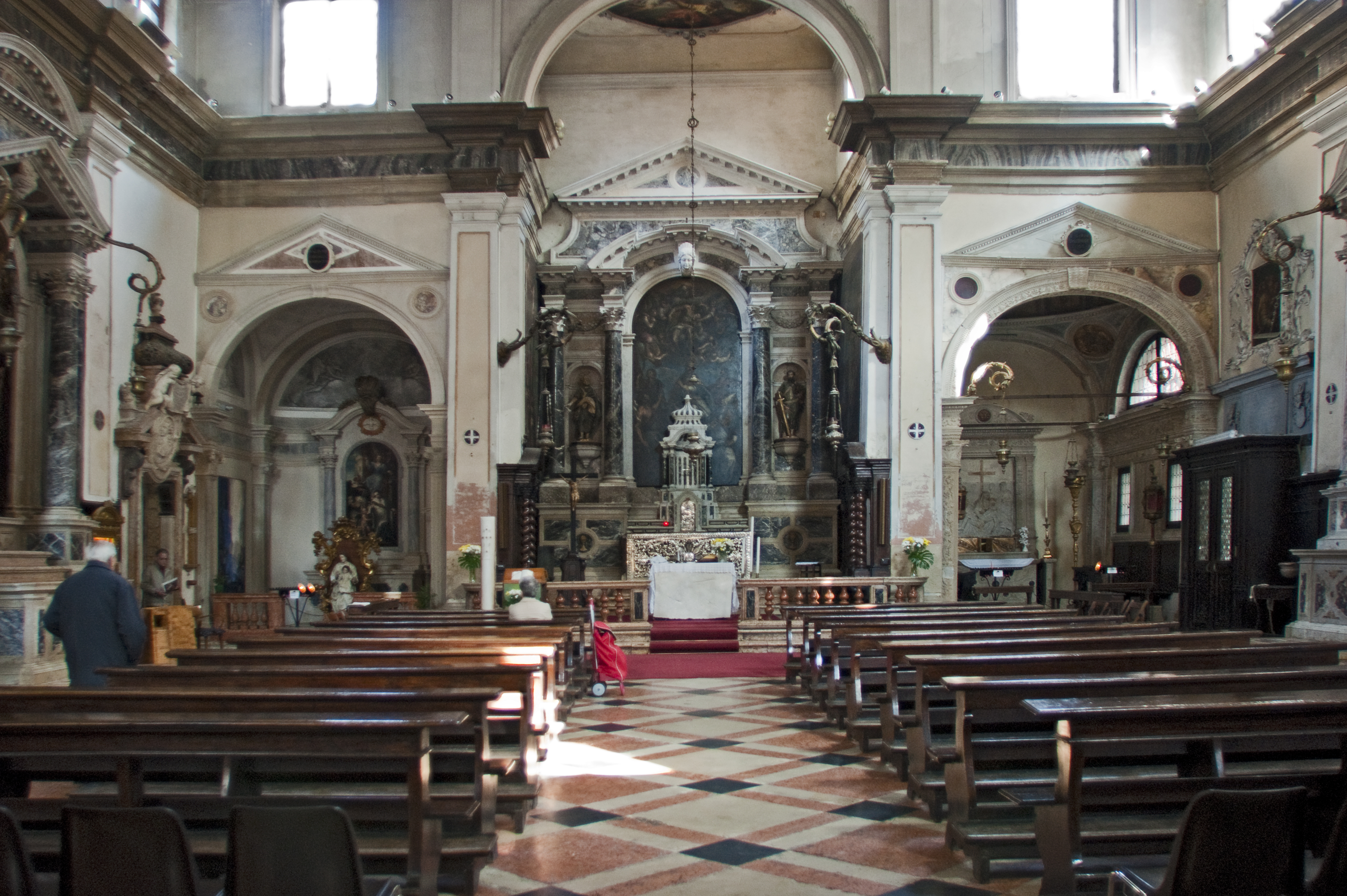
Interior

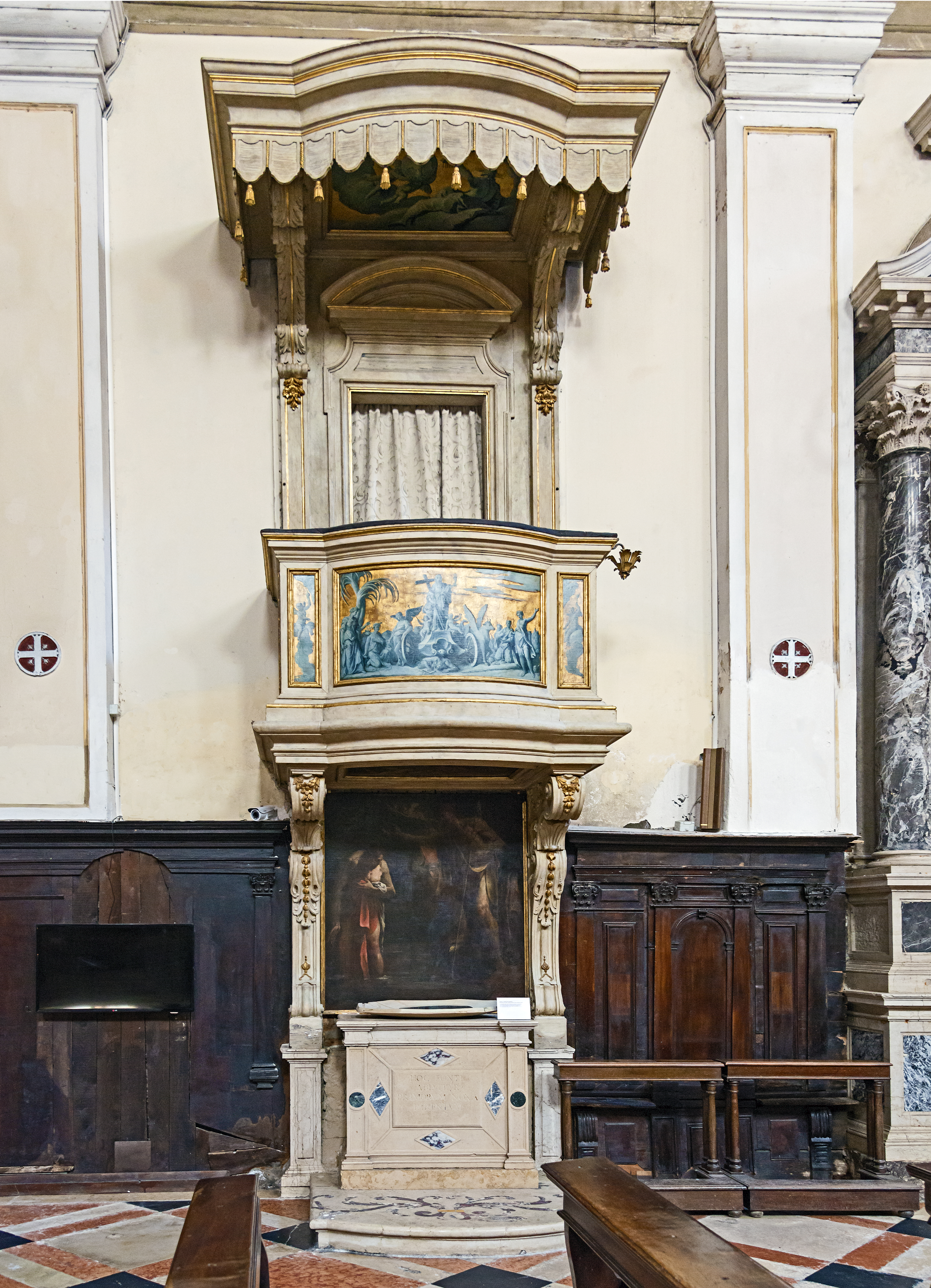
Baptismal font and Pulpit

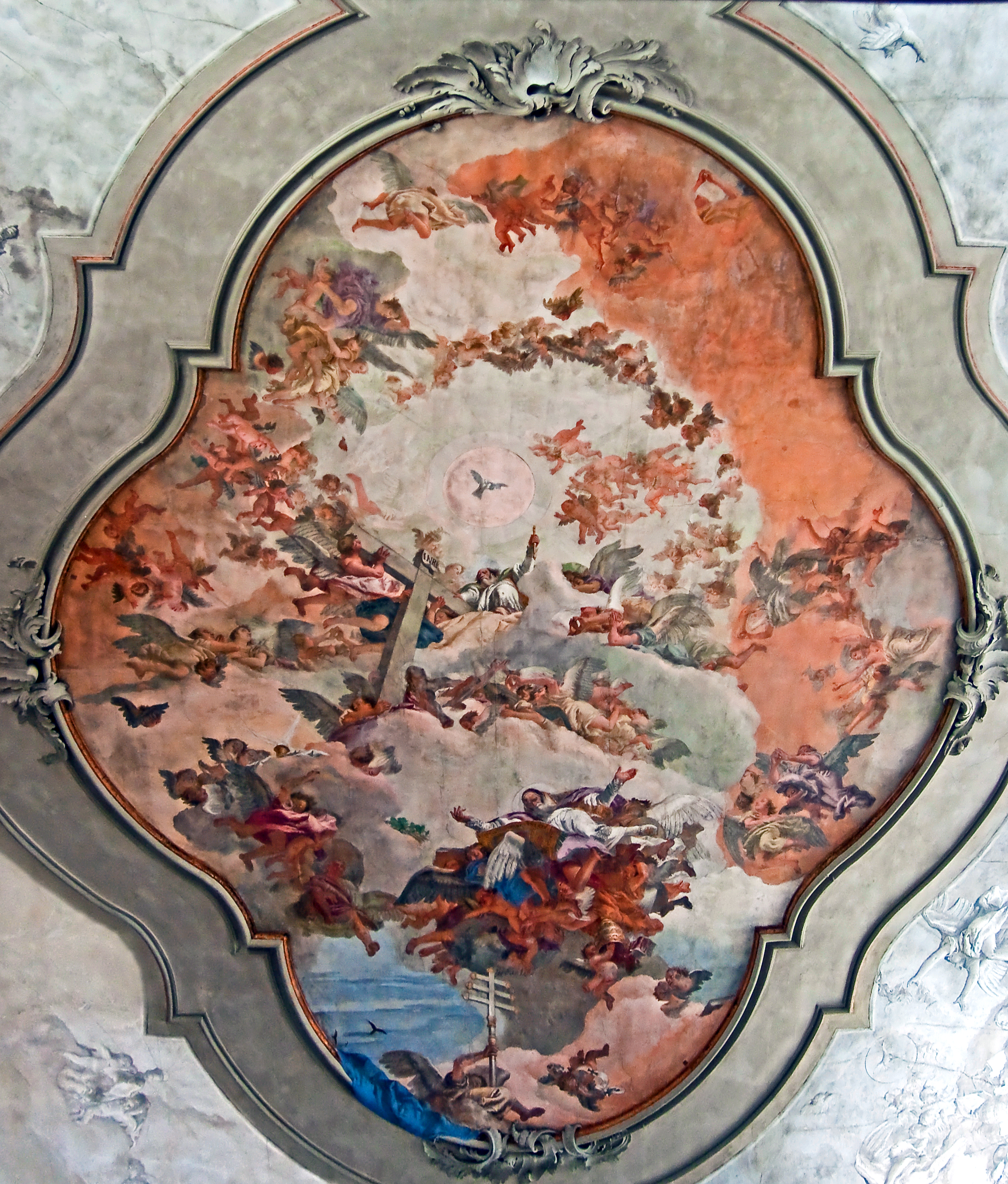
Angels and virtues by Giandomenico Tiepolo

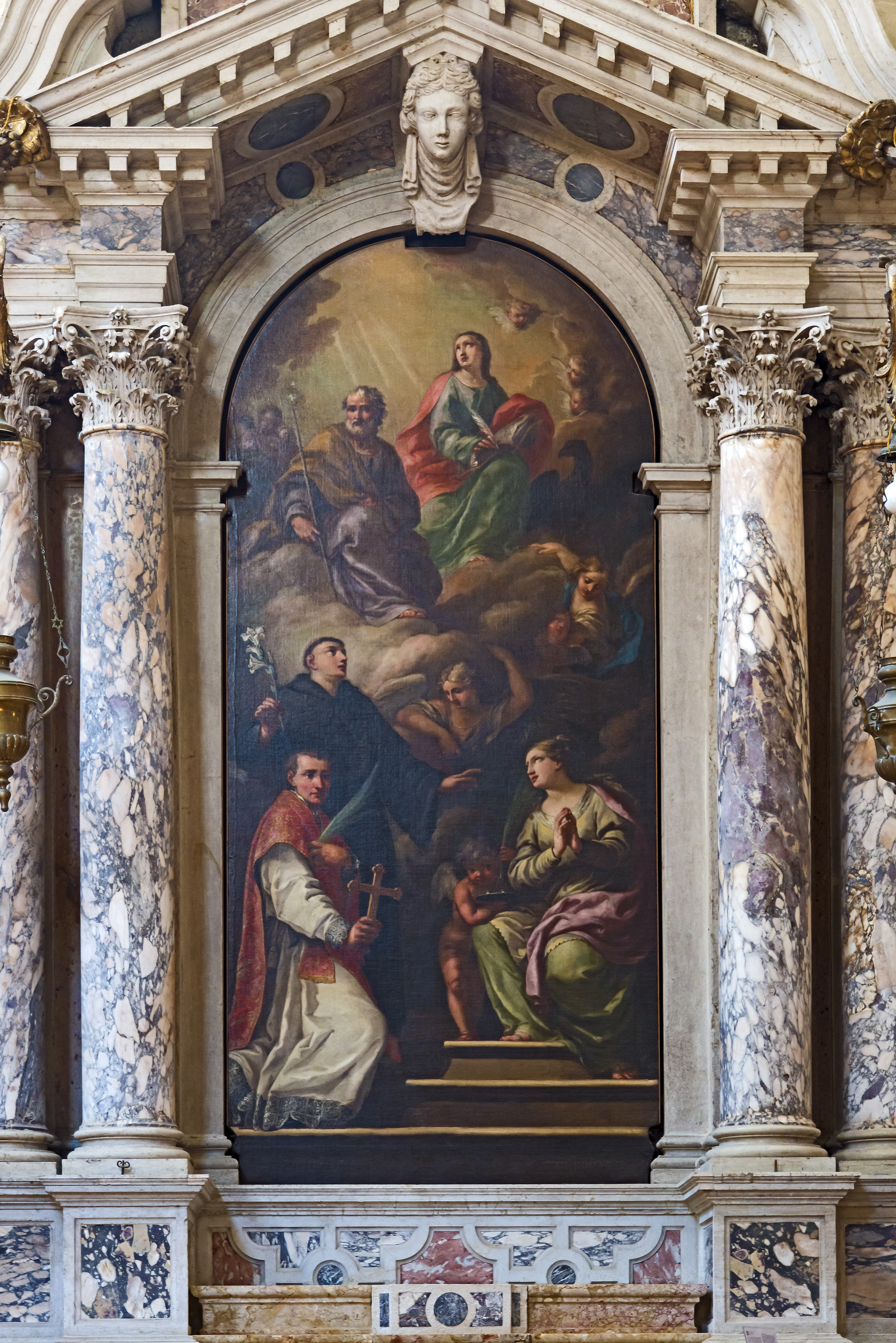
Padre Celeste con santi Pietro Antonio Novelli

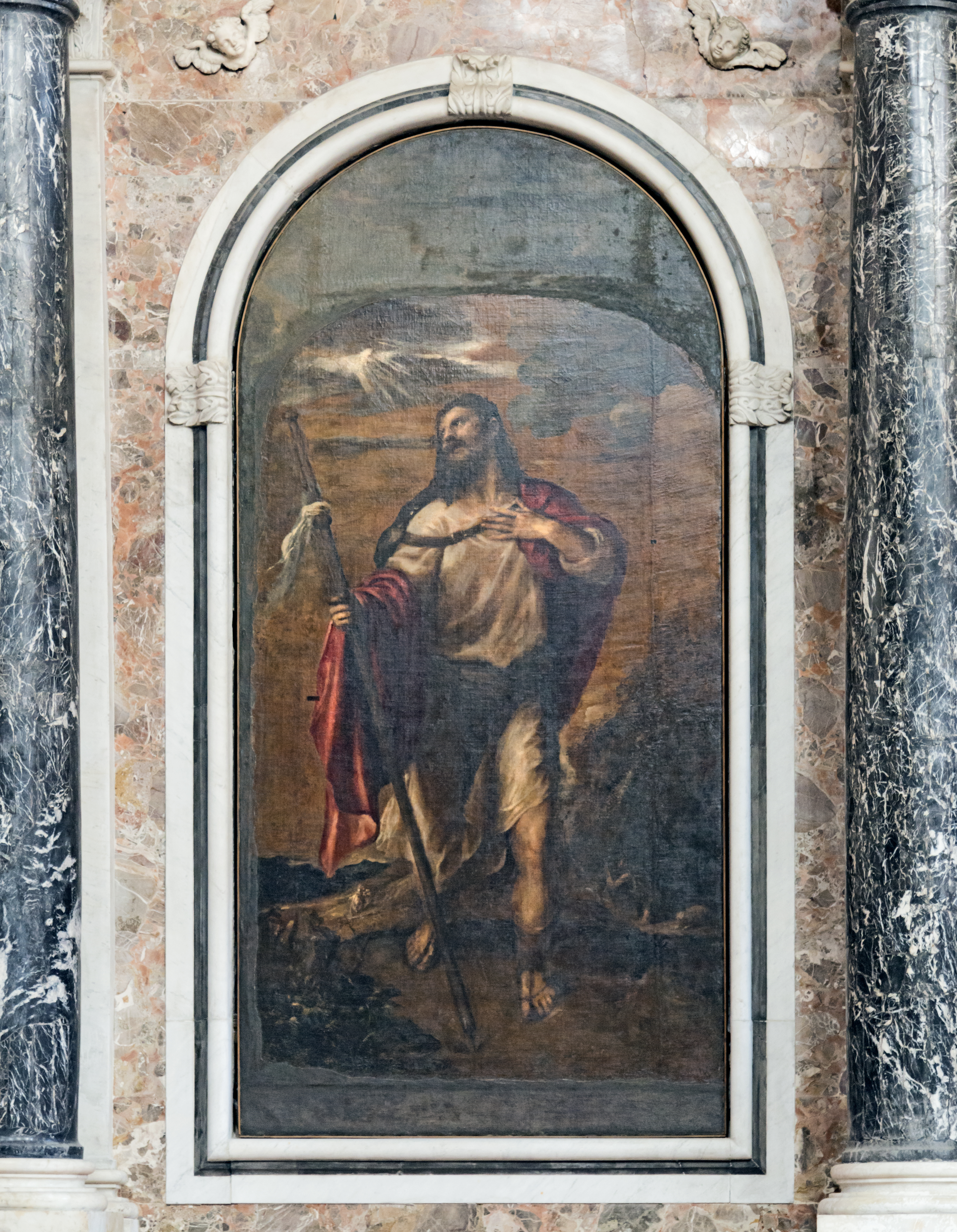
Apostolo Giacomo il maggiore - Titian - 1558

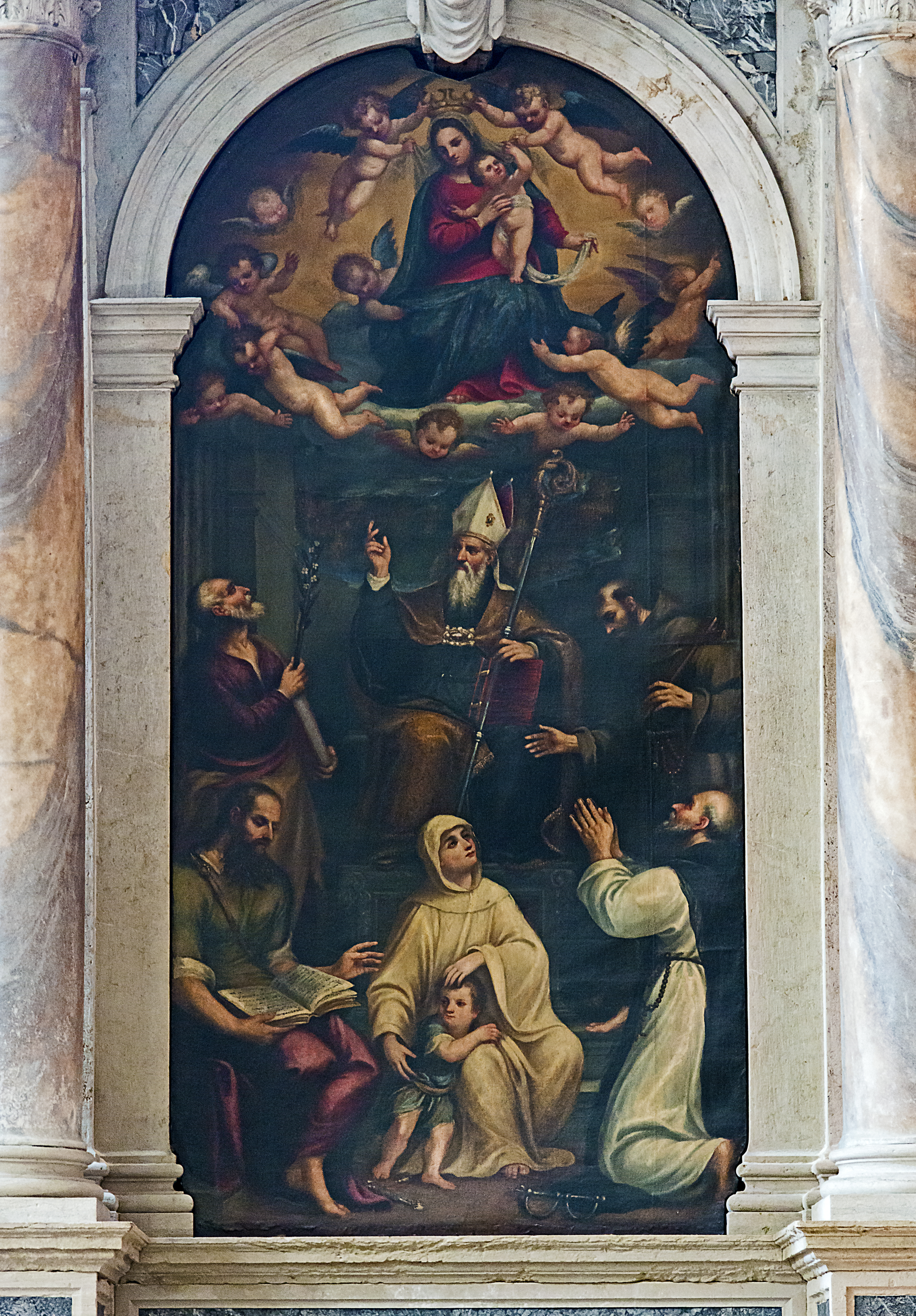
Gloria di Maria - Venetian school before 1700.

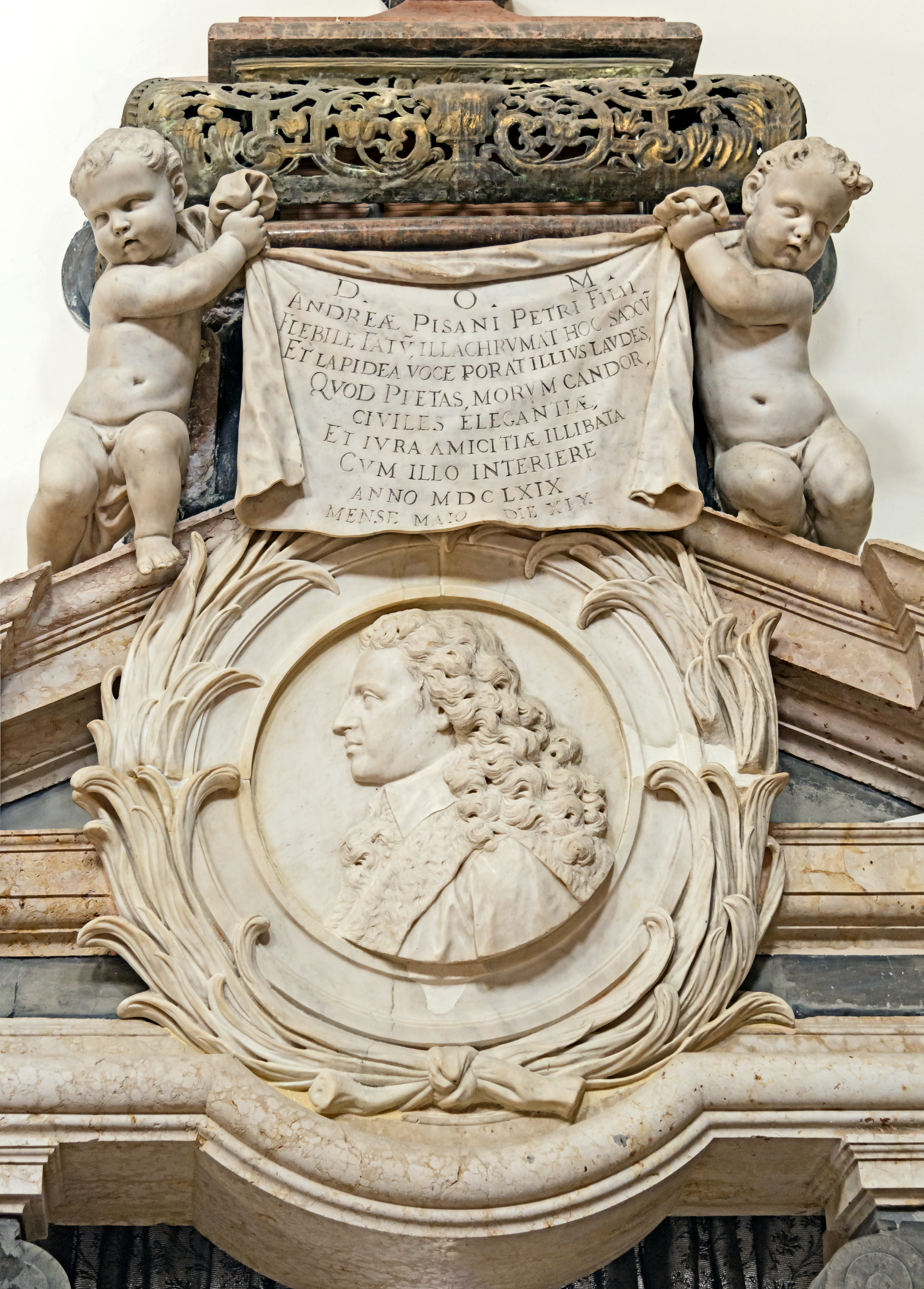
Monument to Andrea Pisani

=== Choir ===
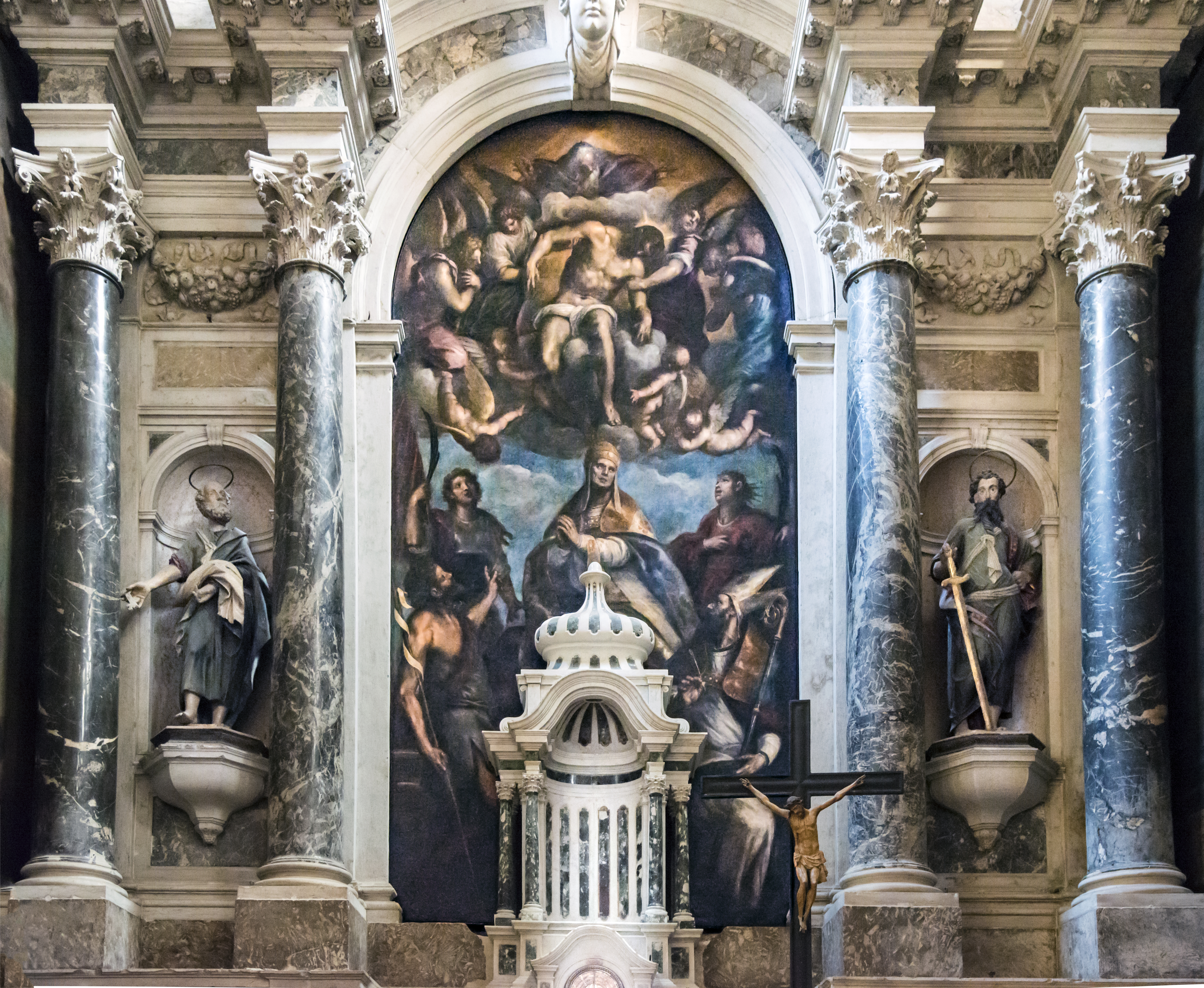
Dead Christ upheld by Saints and Angels by Jacopo Palma il Giovane

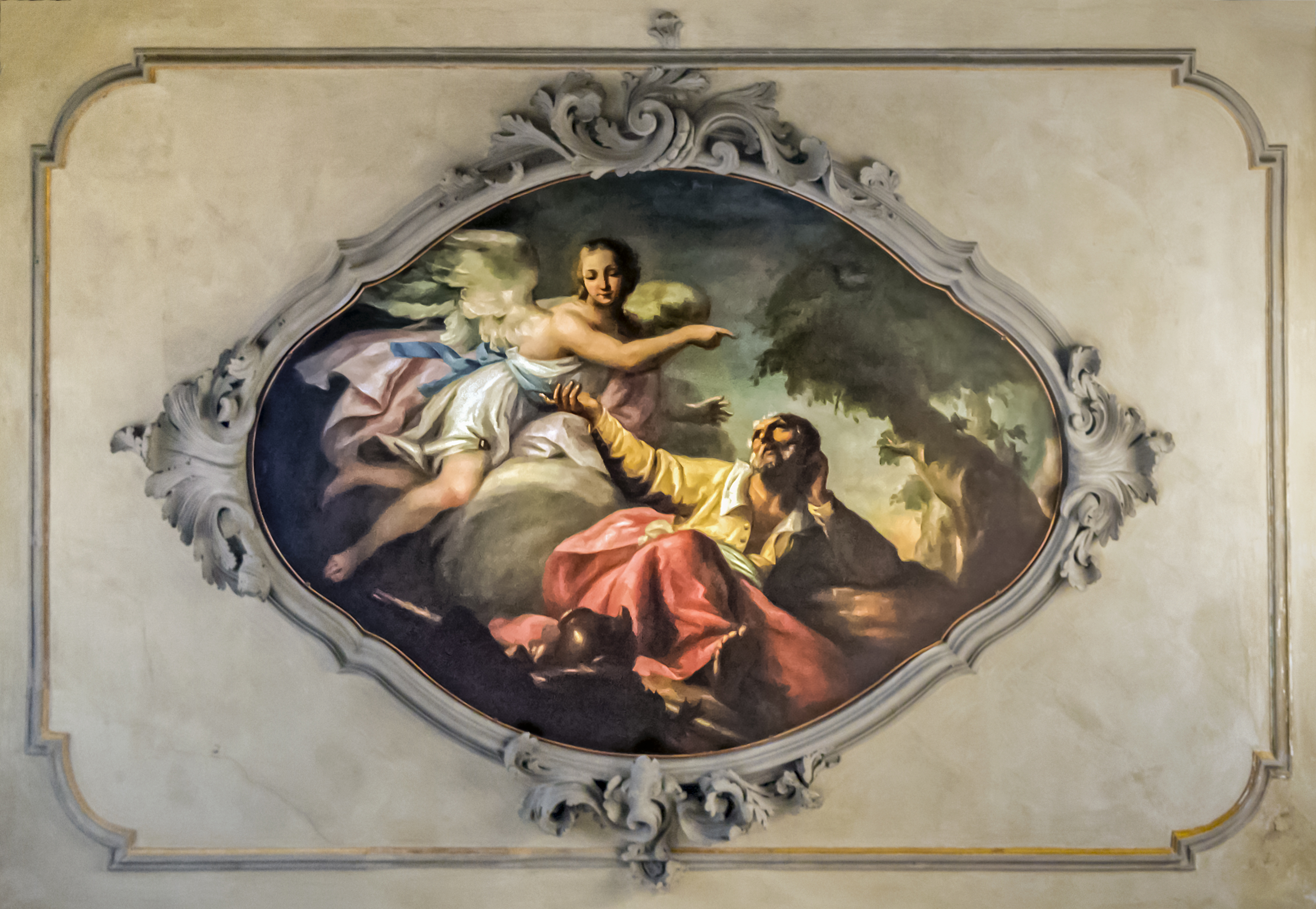
Angel comes down to comfort Elijah P. Moro

=== Chapel Gusoni ===
- Four Evangelists, sculpture by Pietro Lombardo, and a Pietà with Saints, by his son Tullio Lombardo in the chapel of the Gussoni family.
- Gussoni Red Veil Paintings Triptych (2015), by artist Sylke von Gaza commissioned by Curia Patriarcale di Venezia
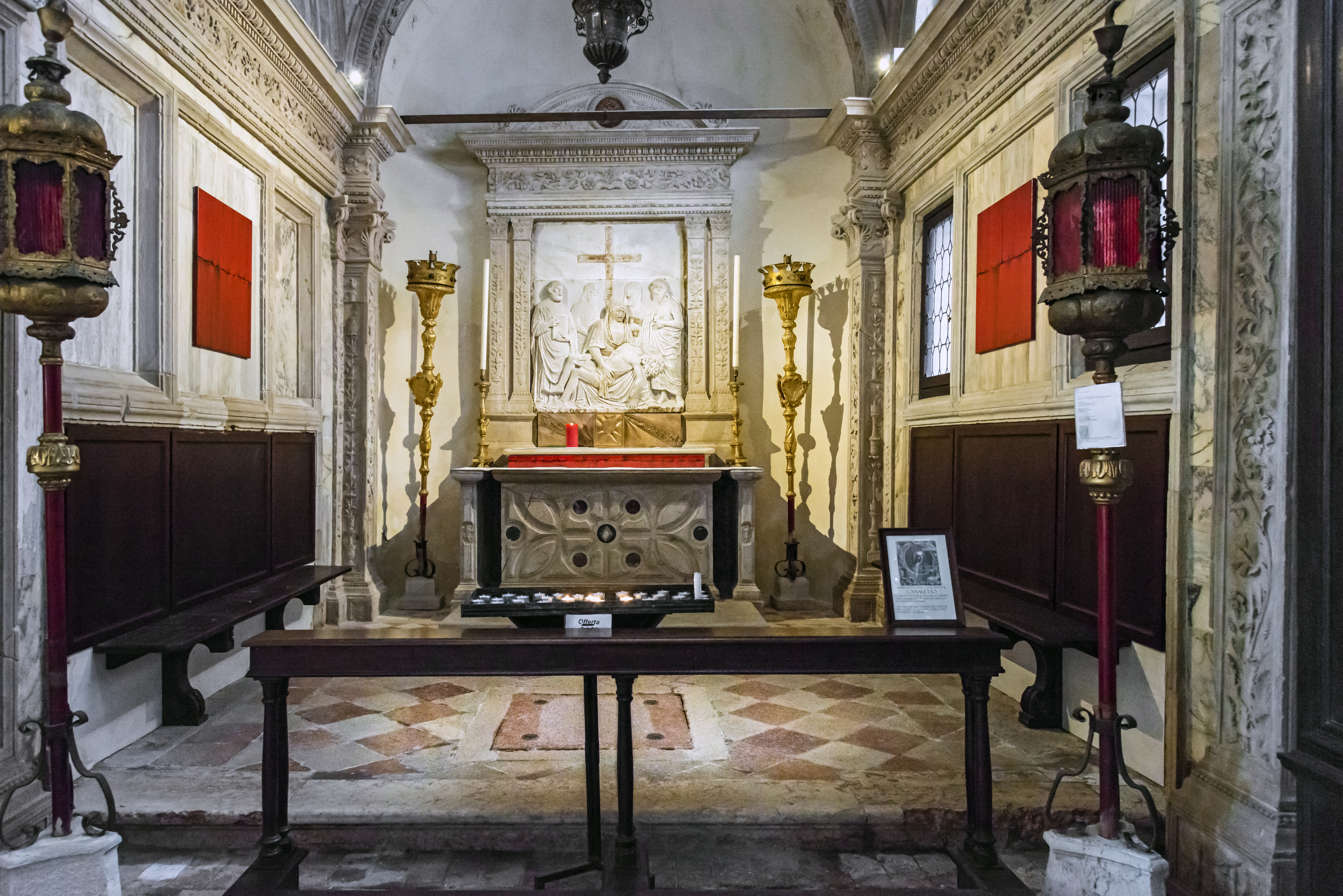
Gussoni chapel with Gussoni Red Veil Paintings Triptych (2015) by Sylke von Gaza

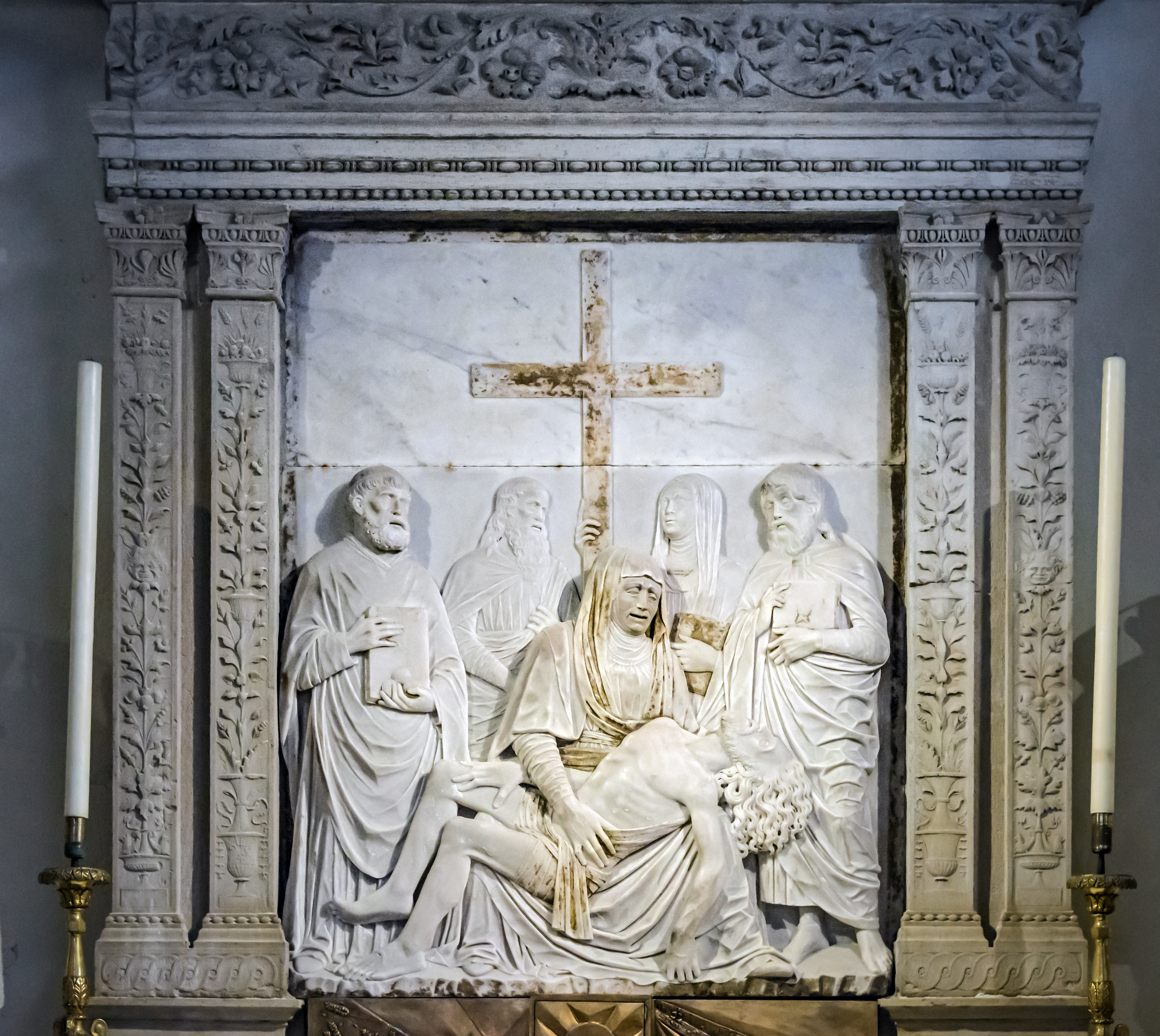
Relief of Lamentation of Christ by Tullio Lombardo

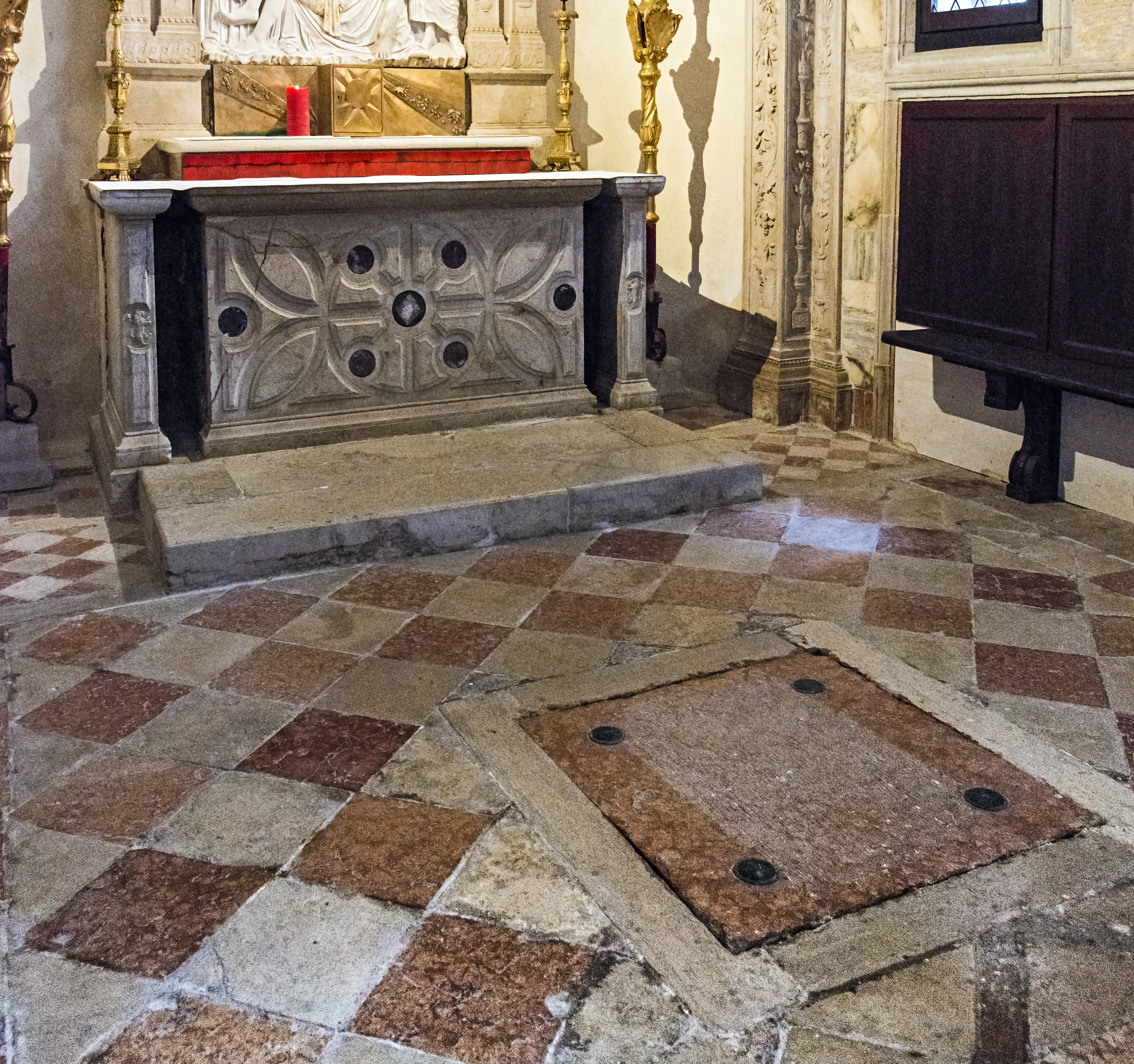
Tomb of Canaletto

== Bibliography ==
- Le chiese di Venezia, Marcello Brusegan; Ed. Newton
- Italian Wikipedia Entry
