= Karmeliterstraße =

Street in Munich, Germany

- Seemüllers Gässel
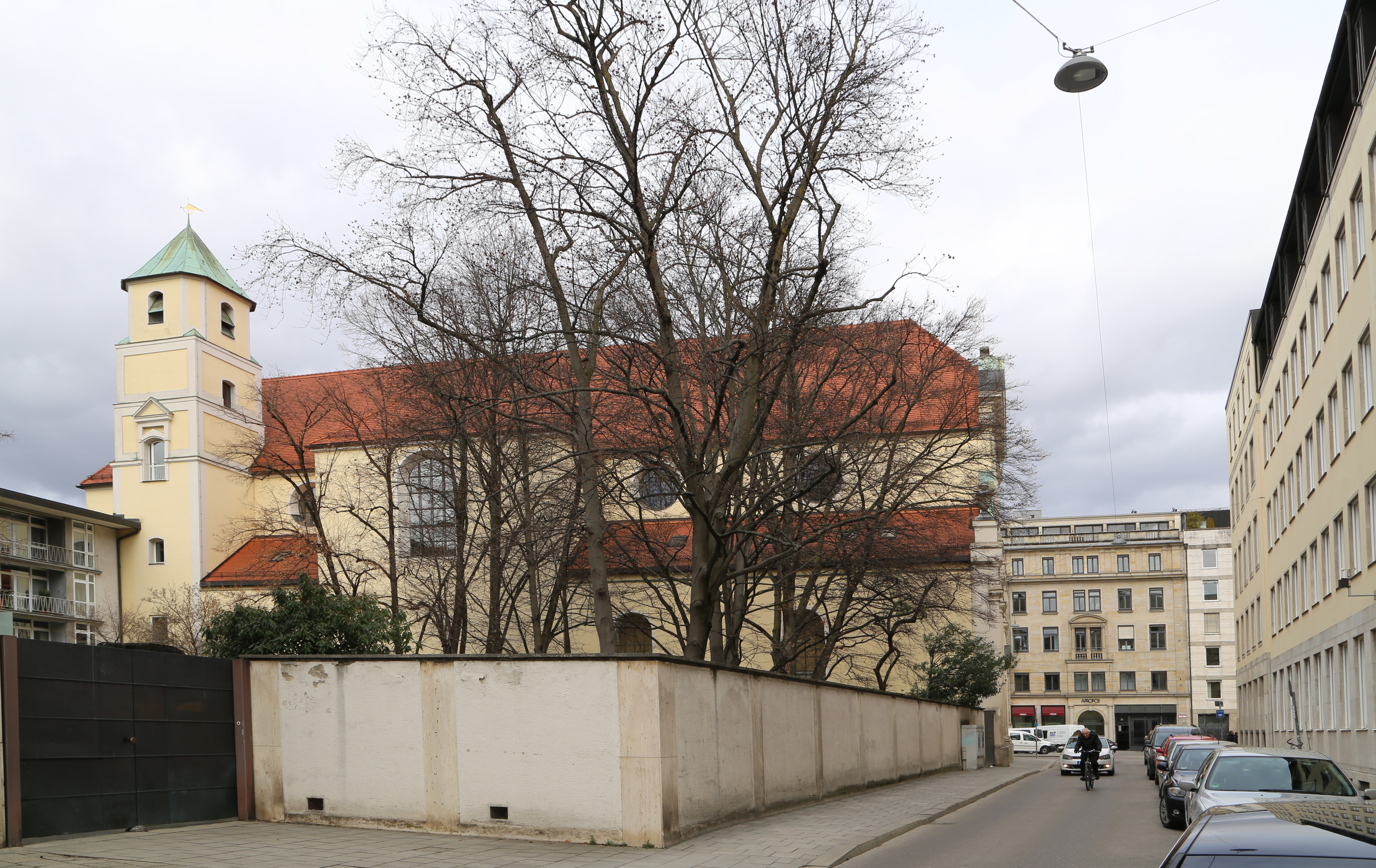
- The Karmeliterstraße with the former Karmeliten Church

- Location within Germany
- Namesake: Karmelitenkirche
- Length: 80 m (260 ft)
- Location: Munich
- Postal code: 80333
- Nearest metro station: Karlsplatz station (S2)
- Coordinates: 48.136604°N 11.537229°E
- Major junctions: Maxburgstraße, Löwengrube

The Karmeliterstraße - often written Karmelitenstraße until the 19th century - is a street in the center of Munich. It is named after the former Karmelitenkirche on the west side of the street.

== Location ==
The Karmeliterstraße is located in the district of Altstadt-Lehel, the central district of Munich, and in the northwest of the old town in the Kreuzviertel.

It has a length of around 80 meters and starts on the west side of Promenadeplatz. It leads in a south-westerly direction to an intersection, from which the Maxburgstraße connects to from Lenbachplatz to the west. From this intersection, Löwengrube is the name of the street that branches off to the east in the direction of the Frauenkirche, approximately 200 meters away. In a south-westerly direction, the route of the Karmeliterstraße continues through the Ettstraße.

== Route ==
On the west side of the Karmeliterstraße is the former Karmeliten Church of Saint Nicholas, built from 1657 to 1660. Today, the profaned building is used as an archive of the Archdiocese of Munich and Freising, while a section serves as an event and exhibition area. Adjacent to it are buildings of the Ordinary of the Archdiocese of Munich with a park, which is separated by a wall from the Karmeliterstraße.

On the east side of the street is a five-story building complex of the Deutsche Bank with two garden courtyards. The building developments previously located there were damaged during the Second World War and later demolished.

The Karmelitenstraße is a one-way street traveling in a southern direction.

== History ==
The age of today's Karmeliterstraße is not known. It has been reported, however, that in the area of today's Promenadeplatz, which lies to the north, there was a municipal Salzstadel (building to the storage and the sales of food salt) during the 15th century which was demolished in 1778.

As the oldest names of today's Karmeliterstraße is from the period between 1509 and 1565 the name Seemüller Gässel, which was changed to Neu Gässel around the 1600s. At the end of the 18th century, Kaltenecker Gässel, as well as Karmelitergasse, aka Karmelitengasse, were to be found. The present-day Karmeliten Church was consecrated in 1660 as a votive and monastery church.

From 1806 to 1944, a Königliches Erziehungsinstitut für Studierende in München (royal educational institute for students in Munich) was located on Karmeliterstraße, which was led by the former Benedictine Benedict of Holland as director from 1811 and was later named Hollandeum after him. The institute was relocated in 1806 from its founding place in the Neuhauser Gasse, into the building of the Karmeliten Church. In 1905, it was officially renamed Albertinum. After the destruction of the building during air raids by the Royal Air Force on 25 April 1944, the institute was once again relocated in 1945.

In the Handels- und Gewerbs-Addreß-Taschenbuch der Königl.-Baierischen Haupt- und Residenz-Stadt München (trade and business address-paperback of the king Baierischen main and residence city Munich) from 1818, the Karmeliterstraße houses numbers 1441 to 1444 are listed. In addition, the Karmeliter-Platze with the house numbers 1445 and 1446 were also listed. For the new house numbering (published in 1833), the house number 1441 became Karmelitergasse 3, the number 1442 became number 4, number 1443 became number 1 (educational institute), and the number 1444 became number 2 (study church). The house numbers 1445 and 1446 from Karmeliterplatze became the Pfandhausgasse, today's Pacellistraße.

== Promenadeplatz, corner of Karmeliterstraße ==
Opposite the Karmeliter Church, the institute building, stood a brewery since 1482, which belonged to the Weihenstephan Abbey (1603-1629) in the 17th century, which was then named after the next owner, Pollinger´sche Brauerei (Pollinger brewery) (1629-1667), which was characterized along with the Salzstädeln at Kalteneckh, aka Kaltenögg, in 1662/63. In the first half of the 19th century in the then still called Karmelitergasse, the brewery was called Kaltenecker, Kalten-Ecker or Kaltenegger Bräuhaus and had the house number 15. According to a sale notice of 1811, the Bräuhaus also was owner to a summer cellar on the Gasteige. The Handels- und Gewerbs-Addreß-Taschenbuch of the Royal Baierisches Haupt- and Residenz-Stadt München of 1818 listed the Kaltenecker-Brauhaus as part of Promenadeplatz after it was used as a parade ground after the demolition of the Salzstadel and was transformed into a green garden space starting in 1804 and was renamed Promenadeplatz.

In 1826, the brewery belonging to the citizen and brewer Johann Gallinger († 1828) was abandoned and in 1848, the brewery name was transferred to the Spatenbrauerei. Due to its proximity to the Karmeliter monastery, the brewery is sometimes referred to as the Karmelitenbrauerei. Even though the Karmeliter monastery actually had its own brewery on Karmelitergasse but it was demolished in the wake of the secularization and in its place the institute buildings of the royal educational institute were erected.

The brewery, with the house number 1440 is now officially listed as Promenadeplatz 15 since 1833, but was also still seen as Karmelitergasse 15, which later referred to the side entrance on Karmelitergasse, aka Karmeliterstraße. Later, the brewery received the general assignment of Promenadeplatz 21, corner of Karmeliterstraße.

As early as 1802, the former Kaltenecker brewery in Karmelitergasse was home to a boutique owned by Dutch textile merchant Gerhard Graeve von Neuenrade, and then the business premises of the Jewish merchant, wholesaler and banker Moritz Guggenheimer (1824-1902). His father Bernhard S. Guggenheimer (1791-1865) moved from Harburg in the Donau-Ries to Munich in 1825 as a small but quite wealthy textile merchant (linen, silk) and had received a wholesale concession from the Munich city council. Together with his sons Moritz, Eduard, Josef and Sigmund, he expanded the wholesale business on Promenadeplatz 21, three of the sons were active as bankers and led the bank Guggenheimer & Co. After Moritz Guggenheimer was one of the co-founders of the Bayerische Vereinsbank in 1869, the bank Guggenheimer was taken over in 1892, from then on until his death, Moritz Guggenheimer belonged on the Supervisory Board of Vereinsbank.

In 1874 the, previously settled on Promenadeplatz 13 and since 1861 existing, cloth wholesale from Meyer Holzinger and Julius Heymann was relocated to Promenadeplatz 21.

Later, the Jewish textile retailer, Sally Eichengrün, opened his popular fabric shop there which, like the brewery, once appears as listed to be "in Karmelitergasse", sometimes as "on Promenadeplatz" aka "on Ritter-von-Epp-Platz". Eichengrün also owned the property, which today corresponds to the Karmeliterstraße 2a. In 1935, the company was denounced for concealing the Jewish character of their company. Their winter closing sale in 1936 ended in a report being made by the Munich police department. In 1938, Eichengrün sold the company to Herbert G. Stiehler and the Frey-Stalf family. In 1939, he then emigrated to Switzerland.

In 1986, the former houses Promenadeplatz 15 (Gunetzrhainerhaus), 19 (Karmeliterbäcker) and 21 were combined to form the current number 15, to which the current building complex belongs to the Deutsche Bank, which also runs along the eastern side of Karmeliterstraße.
