= Karmelitenkirche =

Baroque former church in Munich, Germany

Coordinates: 48°08′25″N 11°34′17″E

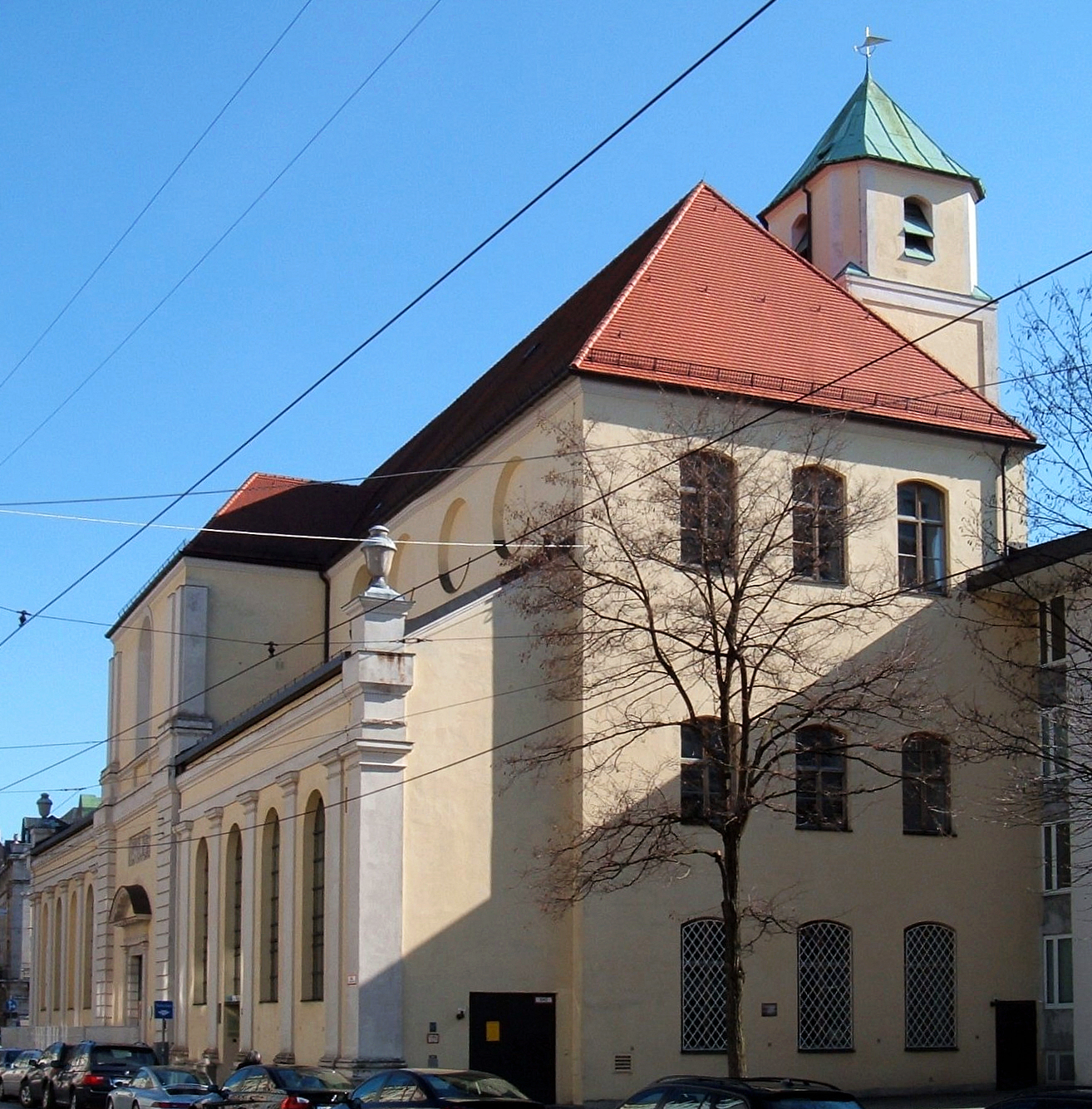
Karmelitenkirche

The Karmelitenkirche or Carmelite Church of St. Nicholas is a Baroque former church at Karmeliterstraße in Munich, Germany. It was built in 1654 to plans by Hans Konrad Asper by Marx Schinnagl as a replacement for the old Carmelite Church. The monastery church was consecrated in 1660. Today it is used as an oratory for the library and reading room of the Metropolitan Chapter of Munich. It is also used for the Archives of the Archdiocese of Munich and Freising.
