= "Untitled" (America) =

Piece of art by Felix Gonzalez-Torres

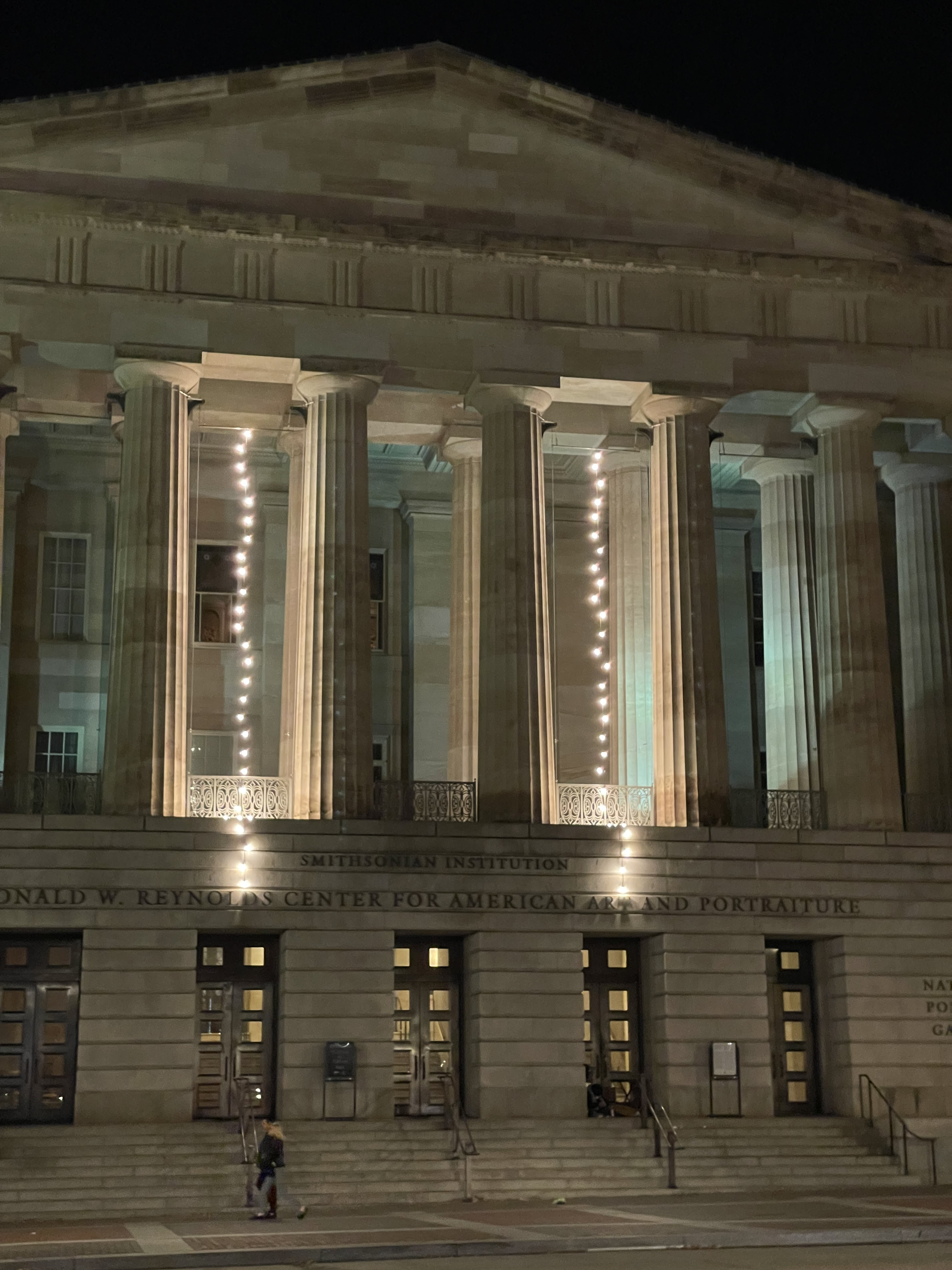
- Two strands from "Untitled" (America) installed on the exterior of the National Portrait Gallery in Washington, D.C., in 2024
- Artist: Félix González-Torres
- Year: 1994
- Medium: Twelve parts, each: 42 light bulbs, waterproof rubber light sockets, and waterproof electrical cords
- Dimensions: Overall dimensions vary with installation
- Location: Whitney Museum of American Art, New York

"Untitled" (America) is an artwork by Felix Gonzalez-Torres that is currently in the collection of the Whitney Museum of American Art. The work consists of twelve individual parts/light strings, each part has 42 light bulbs. The artist purposefully chose not to specify how the work should be installed. An integral part of the artwork is that each time it is installed the exhibitor's choice of configuration completes the work.

Gonzalez-Torres said of the work in a 1995 statement: "The instructions - or lack of them guarantees that once I am no longer here this work will still be alive - constant change in different configurations, as in a dream taking almost no space."

The light bulbs needed to install the work are most often sourced by the exhibitor and the original light bulbs are used as a guideline when choosing the brightness, shape and finish of the bulbs used for an installation.

"Untitled" (America) is the only light string in Gonzalez-Torres's oeuvre that is ideally intended to be installed outdoors. The exhibitor may choose to install the piece, in its entirety or using any number of the twelve parts, outdoors and/or indoors.

== Installations ==
The work was first installed in About Place: Recent Art of the Americas at The Art Institute of Chicago in March, 1995. Five of the twelve light strings hung down from the ceiling and pooled together on the floor.

The initial outdoor installation of the work took place in Limerick, Ireland in 1996 [EV+A: Exhibition of Visual Art. Limerick City Gallery of Art, Limerick, Ireland. 8 Mar. – 4 May 1996. Cur. Guy Tortosa.]. For this installation the light strings were installed in a zigzag pattern over a city street, suspended from buildings at a height slightly above shop signs.

In 2000, the work was included in The American Century: Art and Culture, 1950 – 2000 on view at The Whitney Museum of American Art in New York. All twelve light strings were strung vertically side-by-side against a wall in a sunken outdoor courtyard at The Whitney's original Breuer building at 945 Madison Avenue.

"Untitled" (America) was included in the 2007 exhibition Felix Gonzalez-Torres: America which was on view in the United States Pavilion, Giardini della Biennale, as part of the 52nd Venice Biennial. The U.S. Commissioner, Nancy Spector, chose to install eight of the individual light strings around an indoor rotunda and four of the light strings across an outdoor courtyard off of the exhibition building.

"Untitled" (America), 1994 was installed in five out of six versions of the 2010/2011 solo exhibition, Felix Gonzalez-Torres: Specific Objects without Specific Form [Felix Gonzalez-Torres: Specific Objects without Specific Form. Wiels Contemporary Art Centre, Brussels, Belgium. 16 Jan. – 2 May 2010. [Additional venues: Fondation Beyeler, Basel, Switzerland. 21 May – 29 Aug. 2010; MMK Museum für Moderne Kunst, Frankfurt, Germany. 28 Jan. – Apr. 2011. In addition to being the main curator of the exhibition, Elena Filipovic chose three artists, Carol Bove, Dahn Vo, and Tino Seghal to curate an additional version of the exhibition at each venue.

In the first installation at the first venue, curated by Filipovic [16 Jan. – 28 Feb. 2010; Wiels Contemporary Art Centre], 12 light strings were installed inside a six-story silo in the museum (a remnant of the building's former use as a brewery).

For Dahn Vo's installation at Wiels [5 Mar. – 2 May 2010] he chose to install the 12 light strings outside the home of Charles Gohy, the museum technician who was overseeing the manifestation and maintenance of the exhibition. Located in the village of Gesves, the work was hung from lamp posts along a country road, and situated so that it would be visible from Gohy's bedroom window.

In Filipovic's installation at Fondation Beyeler, Basel, Switzerland [21 May – 25 Jul. 2010] the 12 light strings were installed in a zig-zag pattern above the Mittlere Rheinbrücke, the oldest bridge in Basel.

At the third and final venue of the solo exhibition [MMK Museum für Moderne Kunst, Frankfurt, Germany. 28 Jan. – 14 Mar. 2011. Cur. Elena Filipovic], Filipovic chose to install the 12 light strings across Paulsplatz [St. Paul's Square] public square in Frankfurt. For Tino Seghal's installation at MMK [18 Mar. – 25 Apr. 2011], 12 light strings were installed hanging vertically on the exterior of the Museum.

The work was installed in 2015 for the inaugural exhibition celebrating the new Whitney Museum of American Art building in the meatpacking district of New York City [America is Hard to See. The Whitney Museum of American Art, New York, NY. 1 May – 27 Sep. 2015. Cur. Donna De Salvo, Carter E. Foster, Dana Miller, Scott Rothkopf with Jane Panetta, Catherine Taft, and Mia Curran.] All 12 light strings were installed in a stairwell; suspended from the ceiling to the floor at the base of the stairs.

A more recent installation of the work occurred at Museu d'Art Contemporani de Barcelona (MACBA) in 2021 [Felix Gonzalez-Torres: The Politics of Relation. Museu d'Art Contemporani de Barcelona (MACBA), Barcelona, Spain. 26 Mar. – 19 Sep. 2021. Cur. Tanya Barson.]. Four light strings were hung vertically on the exterior facade of the museum, and eight light strings were installed horizontally between street lights at the Rambla del Raval (a large public space with a central pedestrian area that has a perimeter of trees).

In 2024 and 2025 the work was included as part of an exhibit in Washington, D.C. titled "Felix Gonzalez-Torrs: Always to Return." Centered on the National Portrait Gallery, the various parts were distributed among five locations: the 2nd floor of the gallery, the F street portico of the gallery, the Lawrence A. Fleischman Gallery at the Archives of American Art, the Martin Luther King Jr. Memorial Library (part of the District of Columbia Public Library) and along 8th Street NW near the museum. The exhibit was scheduled to run from 18 October 2024 to 6 July 2025.

== Exhibition History ==
- Felix Gonzalez-Torres: Always to Return. National Portrait Gallery, Washington, D.C., U.S.A. 18 Oct. 2024 - 6 July 2025. Cur. Josh T Franco and Charlotte Ickes.
- Felix Gonzalez-Torres: The Politics of Relation. Museu d'Art Contemporani de Barcelona (MACBA), Barcelona, Spain. 26 Mar. – 19 Sep. 2021. Cur. Tanya Barson.
- OPEN AT NIGHT – Festival of Lights. Villa Medici, Rome, Italy. 16 Dec. 2017 – 28 Jan. 2018. Cur. Chiara Parisi.
- Permanent Collection Installation. The Whitney Museum of American Art, New York. 28 Sep. 2015 – 1 Mar. 2017.
- America is Hard to See. The Whitney Museum of American Art, New York, NY. 1 May – 27 Sep. 2015. Cur. Donna De Salvo, Carter E. Foster, Dana Miller, Scott Rothkopf with Jane Panetta, Catherine Taft, and Mia Curran.
- Felix Gonzalez-Torres: Specific Objects without Specific Form. MMK Museum für Moderne Kunst, Frankfurt, Germany. 28 Jan. – 14 Mar. 2011. Cur. Elena Filipovic; 18 Mar. – 25 Apr. 2011. Installation cur. Tino Sehgal. Catalogue. [Second installation at third of three venues. Additional venues: Wiels Contemporary Art Centre, Brussels, Belgium. 16 Jan. – 2 May 2010; Fondation Beyeler, Basel Switzerland. 21 May – 29 Aug. 2010.]
- Felix Gonzalez-Torres: Specific Objects without Specific Form. MMK Museum für Moderne Kunst, Frankfurt, Germany. 28 Jan. – 14 Mar. 2011. Cur. Elena Filipovic; 18 Mar. – 25 Apr. 2011. Installation cur. Tino Sehgal. Catalogue. [First installation at third venue. Third of three venues. Additional venues: Wiels Contemporary Art Centre, Brussels, Belgium. 16 Jan. – 2 May 2010; Fondation Beyeler, Basel Switzerland. 21 May – 29 Aug. 2010.]
- Felix Gonzalez-Torres: Specific Objects without Specific Form. Fondation Beyeler, Basel, Switzerland. 21 May – 25 Jul. 2010. Cur. Elena Filipovic; 31 Jul. – 29 Aug. 2010. Installation cur. Carol Bove. Catalogue. [First installation at second venue. Second of three venues. Additional venues: Wiels Contemporary Art Centre, Brussels, Belgium. 16 Jan. – 2 May 2010; MMK Museum für Moderne Kunst, Frankfurt, Germany. 28 Jan. – 25 Apr. 2011.]
- Felix Gonzalez-Torres: Specific Objects without Specific Form. Wiels Contemporary Art Centre, Brussels, Belgium. 16 Jan. – 28 Feb. 2010. Cur. Elena Filipovic; 5 Mar. – 2 May 2010. Installation cur. Danh Vo. Catalogue. [Second installation at first of three venues. Additional venues: Fondation Beyeler, Basel, Switzerland. 21 May – 29 Aug. 2010; MMK Museum für Moderne Kunst, Frankfurt, Germany. 28 Jan. – Apr. 2011.]
- Felix Gonzalez-Torres: Specific Objects without Specific Form. Wiels Contemporary Art Centre, Brussels, Belgium. 16 Jan. – 28 Feb. 2010. Cur. Elena Filipovic; 5 Mar. – 2 May 2010. Installation cur. Danh Vo. Catalogue. [First installation at first venue. First of three venues. Additional venues: Fondation Beyeler, Basel, Switzerland. 21 May – 29 Aug. 2010; MMK Museum für Moderne Kunst, Frankfurt, Germany. 28 Jan. – Apr. 2011.]
- Felix Gonzalez-Torres: America. The United States Pavilion, Giardini della Biennale, 52nd International Art Exhibition, La Biennale di Venezia [The Venice Biennial], Venice, Italy. 10 Jun. – 21 Nov. 2007. Commissioned by Nancy Spector. Catalogue.
- New York, New York: Cinquante ans d'art, architecture, photographie, film et video [New York, New York: Fifty Years of Art, Architecture, Photography, Film and Video]. Grimaldi Forum Monaco, Monte Carlo, Monaco. 14 Jul. – 10 Sep. 2006. Cur. Lisa Dennison. Catalogue.
- Extra-Ordinary: The Everday Object in American Art. The Frist Center for Visual Arts, Nashville, TN. 10 Nov. 2006 – 11 Feb. 2007. Cur. Dana Miller.
- Landscape. The Whitney Museum of American Art, New York, NY. 25 Mar. – 18 Sep. 2005. Cur. Donna De Salvo.
- The Magic of Light. The Hudson River Art Museum, Yonkers, NY. 1 Feb. – 19 May 2002. Catalogue.
- In Between: Art & Architecture. Schindler House, MAK Center for Art and Architecture, Los Angeles, CA. 14 Mar. – 2 Sep. 2001. Cur. LouAnne Greenwald. Catalogue. [With billboard installed on W Pico Boulevard in conjunction with the exhibition.]
- Felix Gonzalez-Torres. Serpentine Gallery, London, England, United Kingdom. 1 Jun. – 16 Jul. 2000. Cur. Lisa G. Corrin. Catalogue. [With satellite venues: Camden Arts Centre, Chelsea and Westminster Hospital, Royal College of Art, Victoria and Albert Museum, and Royal Geographical Society, London, England, United Kingdom.]
- The American Century: Art and Culture, 1950 – 2000. The Whitney Museum of American Art, New York, NY. 26 Sep. 1999 – 13 Feb. 2000. Cur. Lisa Phillips. Catalogue. [Part two of the exhibition The American Century: Art and Culture, 1900 – 2000. 23 Apr. 1999 – 13 Feb. 2000.]
- Manifesta 2: European Biennial of Contemporary Art. Casino Luxembourg, Forum d'Art Contemporain, Luxembourg City, Luxembourg. 28 Jun. – 11 Oct. 1998. Cur. Robert Fleck, Maria Lind, and Barbara Vanderlinden. Catalogue.
- Light x Eight: The Hanukkah Project: A Festival in Lights. The Jewish Museum, New York, NY. 13 Dec. 1998 – 31 Jan. 1999. Cur. Heidi Zuckerman Jacobson.
- 1997 Biennial Exhibition. The Whitney Museum of American Art, New York, NY. 20 Mar. – 15 Jun. 1997. Cur. Louise Neri and Lisa Phillips. Catalogue.
- Simple Form. Henry Art Gallery, University of Washington, Seattle, WA. 13 Nov. 1997 – 1 Feb. 1998. Cur. Sheryl Conkelton.
- Felix Gonzalez-Torres (Girlfriend in a Coma). Musée d'Art Moderne de la Ville de Paris, Paris, France. 11 Apr. – 16 Jun. 1996. Cur. Suzanne Pagé, Béatrice Parent, and Nancy Spector. Catalogue. [Third of three venues. Additional venues: The Solomon R. Guggenheim Museum, New York, NY. 3 Mar. – 10 May 1995. Shown under the exhibition title Felix Gonzalez-Torres; Centro Galego de Arte Contemporánea, Santiago de Compostela, Spain. 12 Dec. 1995 – 3 Mar. 1996. Shown under the exhibition title Felix Gonzalez-Torres (A Possible Landscape).]
- EV+A: Exhibition of Visual Art. Limerick City Gallery of Art, Limerick, Ireland. 8 Mar. – 4 May 1996. Cur. Guy Tortosa.
- Longing and Belonging: From the Faraway Nearby. Museum of Fine Arts/SITE Santa Fe, Santa Fe, NM. 14 Jul. – 8 Oct. 1995. Cur. Bruce W. Ferguson and Vincent J. Varga.
- About Place: Recent Art of the Americas. The Art Institute of Chicago, Chicago, IL. 11 Mar. – 21 May 1995. Cur. Madeleine Grynsztejn. Catalogue.
- Felix Gonzalez-Torres (A Possible Landscape). Centro Galego de Arte Contemporánea, Santiago de Compostela, Spain. 12 Dec. 1995 – 3 Mar. 1996. Cur. Gloria Moure and Nancy Spector. Catalogue. [Second of three venues. Additional venues: The Solomon R. Guggenheim Museum, New York, NY. 3 Mar. – 10 May 1995. Shown under the exhibition title Felix Gonzalez-Torres; Musée d'Art Moderne de la Ville de Paris, France. 11 Apr. – 16 Jun. 1996. Shown under the exhibition title Felix Gonzalez-Torres (Girlfriend in a Coma).]
