= Dematerialization (art) =

Dematerialization of the art object is an idea in conceptual art defined as the ideas and concepts behind a work is primary and the material form is secondary. In "Six Years: The Dematerialization of the Art Object" Lucy L. Lippard characterizes the period of 1966 to 1972 as one in which the art object was dematerialised and de-centered through the new artistic practices of conceptual art.

== Examples ==
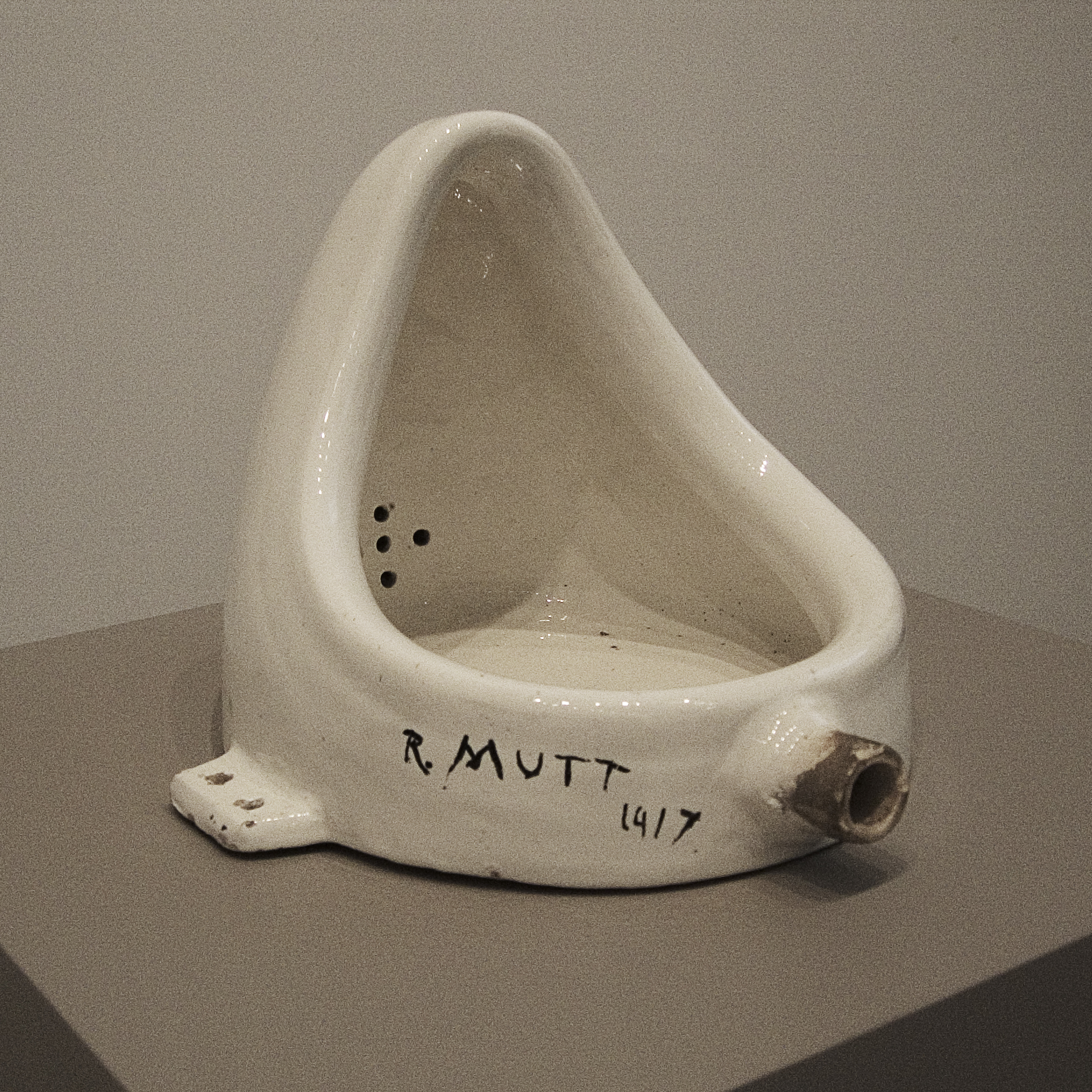
Duchamp's Fountain

An early example of dematerialization is Dadaist Marcel Duchamp's Fountain. Fountain consists of a porcelain urinal signed "R. Mutt". Duchamp entered the work into the Society of Independent Artist's first exhibition, where it was rejected. Fountain brings into question what art can be, and laid the groundwork for later conceptual artists.

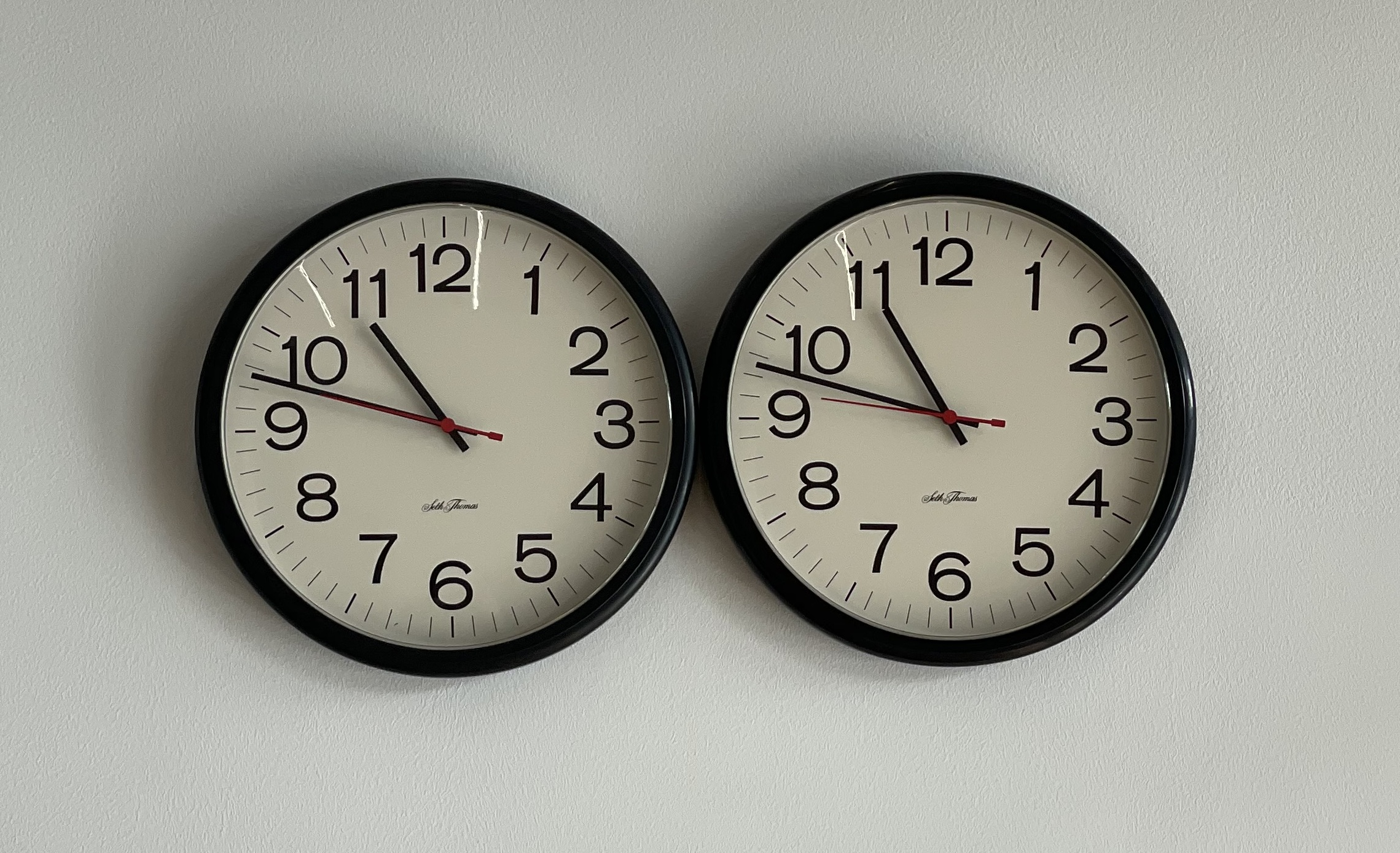
Untitled (Perfect Lovers)

The work of American conceptual artist Felix Gonzales-Torres can be considered an example of dematerialization. In Untitled (Perfect Lovers) (1967-1990), two wall clocks constitute the work. The clocks were placed side by side, and eventually one will stop ticking before the other. This work explores Gonzales-Torres' fear of death and time, with the artist saying "Time is something that scares me . . . or used to...I wanted to face it. I wanted those two clocks right in front of me, ticking. Untitled (Perfect Lovers) could be conveyed through other means, but the artist specifically utilized readymade objects, dissociating the piece from the medium.
