= "Untitled" (Golden) =

Installation artwork created by Félix González-Torres in 1995

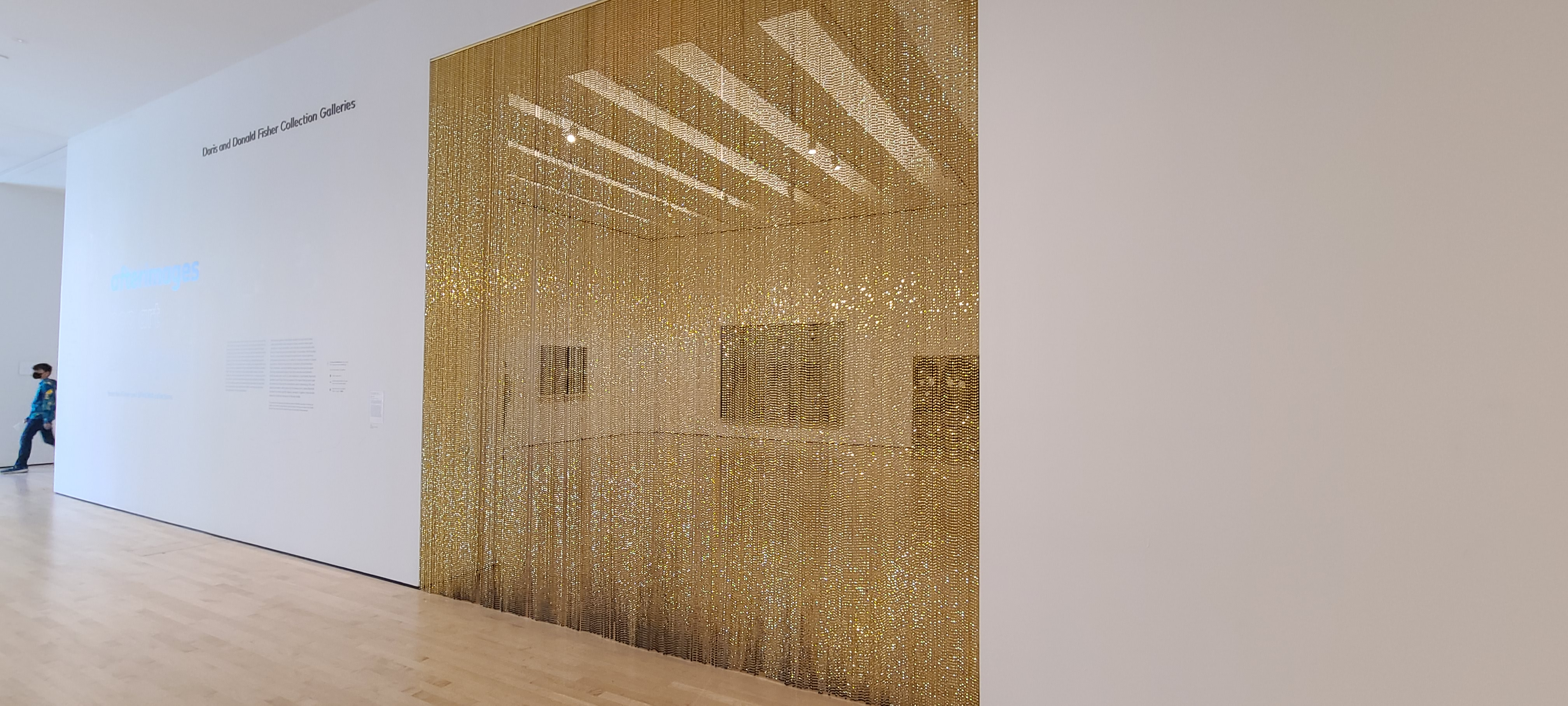
- "Untitled" (Golden) at SFMoMA in 2022
- Artist: Félix González-Torres
- Year: 1995
- Medium: Strands of beads and hanging device
- Dimensions: Dimensions vary with installation
- Location: The Solomon R. Guggenheim Museum; San Francisco Museum of Modern Art (SFMOMA); Art Institute of Chicago.

"Untitled" (Golden) is the title of a work of conceptual art created by Felix Gonzalez-Torres in 1995. The work is co-owned by the Solomon R. Guggenheim Museum, San Francisco Museum of Modern Art (SFMOMA), and Art Institute of Chicago.

This work is one of the five 'beaded curtain works' in Gonzalez-Torres's oeuvre. The beaded curtain works are manifestable. As with all manifestation works, the beaded curtain works aren't physically permanent, they can exist in more than one place at a time and can vary from one installation to the next based on decisions made by the exhibitor and the specific architecture of the site where the work is installed.

== Presentation ==
A manifestation of "Untitled" (Golden) consists of strands of faceted gold-colored beads installed across a passageway or other location through which people naturally pass. Each manifestation of a beaded curtain differs; the curtain must fill the chosen site of installation from side-to-side, ideally extending to the full height of the site, and hang as close to the ground as possible without touching (allowing the beaded curtain to sway freely as individuals pass through).

Gonzalez-Torres made aesthetic and conceptual choices around the color and characteristics of the bead strands used for each beaded curtain work. The description of the original beads indicates the characteristics of each type of bead and how one type of bead strand varies in relation to another. The original bead color(s) and pattern are maintained from one manifestation to the next.

The exhibitor chooses the specific type of bead strands used to manifest the work, the location and the overall size of the installation of the work. These choices may vary from manifestation to manifestation.

== Exhibitions and interpretations ==
=== Berlin 1996 ===
"Untitled" (Golden) was first exhibited alongside "Untitled" (A Portrait), 1991/1995 in a special installation of two of the artist's works curated by Frank Wagner at neue Gesellschaft für bildende Kunst (NGBK), Berlin, Germany, which was open from August 3 – September 1, 1996. The press release for the exhibition stated: "Felix Gonzalez-Torres is an important representative of the new conceptual art. He examines the fundamental elements of meaning in order to achieve the greatest possible effect with the most reduced means." The work was installed across the widest section of a series of galleries.

=== New York 2009-10 ===
In an exhibition curated by Nancy Spector, Paired, Gold: Felix Gonzalez-Torres and Roni Horn, at the Solomon R. Guggenheim Museum, New York, NY (2 Oct. 2009 – 2 Jan. 2010), the work was installed in the context of one other artwork, Roni Horn's Gold Field, 1980–82. "Untitled" (Golden) was installed across the middle of the gallery.

=== Brussels and Basel 2010 ===
"Untitled" (Golden) was included in multiple installations of the six part exhibition, Felix Gonzalez-Torres: Specific Objects without Specific Form, curated by Elena Filipovic, with Danh Vo, Carol Bove, and Tino Seghal. The work was included in the initial installation of the exhibition, curated by Elena Filipovic, at the first venue, WIELS, Brussels from January 26th to February 18th, 2010. At WIELS, "Untitled" (Golden) was suspended from a hanging device that hung just below the exposed concrete beams of the ceiling and spanned the entire width of a gallery. Danh Vo chose to de-install the curtain work for his installation at WIELS. The second venue of the exhibition was the Fondation Beyeler, in Basel, Switzerland. In the first installation at the Fondation Beyler, curated by Elena Filipovic, the work was installed across the length of a permanent collection gallery. In the second installation, curated by Carol Bove, the work remained in the same location.

=== Boston 2011 ===
In a solo presentation at the Museum of Fine Arts, Boston, each of Gonzalez-Torres's beaded curtain works, including "Untitled" (Golden), was installed in succession in the same location. Each work was installed in a passageway between galleries Passages: Felix Gonzalez-Torres was on view from September 2011 through June 2015, and was curated by Jen Mergel. The first beaded curtain to be installed was "Untitled" (Beginning) in September of 2011. "Untitled" (Golden) was the second installation and was on view starting in March of 2012 through early January 2013. In January 2013, "Untitled" (Water) was installed, "Untitled" (Blood) was installed in October of the same year and the final curtain, "Untitled" (Chemo) was installed in August 2014 and stayed on view until June 2015.

=== New York 2015 ===
Storylines: Contemporary Art at the Guggenheim was on view at the Solomon R. Guggenheim Museum, New York, NY, from June 5th – September 9th, 2015. The exhibition focused on the structures for creating narratives and the subjective nature of encountering an artwork; artists working across all mediums, including visual artists, filmmakers, musicians, and writers contributed to the show. "Untitled" (Golden) was installed in eight adjacent alcoves on the second through the fifth floors of the museum. Each alcove serves as an entry point to various galleries off of the main rotunda of the museum.

=== Shanghai 2016 ===
The work was also included in the solo exhibition Felix Gonzalez-Torres, on view at Rockbund Art Museum, Shanghai, China from September to December 2016. The curators of the show, Larys Frogier and Li Qi, chose to install the work across the midpoint of the fourth floor gallery which partially opens to an atrium above. The ceiling height in this particular gallery spans two floors and increases at stepped intervals. The height of the ceiling of the main gallery initially steps up to the height of an upper walkway, and then extends fully to the open atrium above. The curtain was installed to follow the architecture of the space and multiple hanging devices were used so that the beaded curtain seamlessly followed the stepped increases in ceiling height.

=== San Francisco 2022 ===
Beginning in 2022, "Untitled" (Golden) was installed at the entry point to the exhibition Afterimages: Pop Art and Beyond at the San Francisco Museum of Modern Art. Afterimages included works from the Fisher and SFMOMA's permanent collections, and was organized by Sarah Roberts, Jenny Gheith, Marin Sarvé-Tarr, and Jenny Dally.

== Exhibition history ==
Afterimages: Pop Art and Beyond from the Fisher and SFMOMA Collections. The San Francisco Museum of Modern Art (SFMOMA), San Francisco, CA. 5 Mar. 2022 – Jan. 2026. Organized by Sarah Roberts, Jenny Gheith, Marin Sarvé-Tarr, and Jenny Dally.

Summer. Museum of Contemporary Art Toronto, Toronto, Canada. 10 Feb. – 9 May 2022. Cur. Rui Mateus Amaral.

Minimalism: Space. Light. Object. National Gallery Singapore, Singapore. 16 Nov. 2018 – 14 Apr. 2019. Cur. Russell Storer.

Space Shifters. Hayward Gallery, London, England, United Kingdom. 26 Sep. 2018 – 6 Jan. 2019. Catalogue.

Permanent Collection Installation. Art Institute of Chicago, Chicago, IL. Aug. 2017 – Aug. 2018.

Felix Gonzalez-Torres. Rockbund Art Museum, Shanghai, China. 30 Sep. – 25 Dec. 2016. Cur. Larys Frogier and Li Qi.

Décor. Boghossian Foundation - Villa Empain, Brussels, Belgium. 8 Sep. 2016 – 2 Apr. 2017. Cur. Tino Sehgal. Catalogue.

Storylines: Contemporary Art at the Guggenheim. Solomon R. Guggenheim Museum, New York, NY. 5 Jun. – 9 Sep. 2015.

Gorgeous. Asian Art Museum, San Francisco, CA. 20 Jun. – 14 Sep. 2014. Organized with The San Francisco Museum of Modern Art (SFMOMA). Catalogue.

Felix Gonzalez-Torres in the Modern Wing. The Art Institute of Chicago, Chicago, IL. 20 Jul. 2011 – 8 Jan. 2012.

Passages: Felix Gonzalez-Torres. Museum of Fine Arts, Boston, MA. 17 Sep. 2011 – Jan. 2015. Cur. Jen Mergel.

Felix Gonzalez-Torres: Specific Objects without Specific Form. Fondation Beyeler, Basel, Switzerland. 21 May – 25 Jul. 2010. Cur. Elena Filipovic; 31 Jul. – 29 Aug. 2010. Installation cur. Carol Bove. Catalogue. [Second installation at second of three venues.]

Felix Gonzalez-Torres: Specific Objects without Specific Form. Fondation Beyeler, Basel, Switzerland. 21 May – 25 Jul. 2010. Cur. Elena Filipovic; 31 Jul. – 29 Aug. 2010. Installation cur. Carol Bove. Catalogue. [First installation at second venue. Second of three venues. Additional venues: Wiels Contemporary Art Centre, Brussels, Belgium. 16 Jan. – 2 May 2010; MMK Museum für Moderne Kunst, Frankfurt, Germany. 28 Jan. – 25 Apr. 2011.]

Felix Gonzalez-Torres: Specific Objects without Specific Form. Wiels Contemporary Art Centre, Brussels, Belgium. 16 Jan. – 28 Feb. 2010. Cur. Elena Filipovic; 5 Mar. – 2 May 2010. Installation cur. Danh Vo. Catalogue. [First installation at first venue. First of three venues. Additional venues: Fondation Beyeler, Basel, Switzerland. 21 May – 29 Aug. 2010; MMK Museum für Moderne Kunst, Frankfurt, Germany. 28 Jan – Apr. 2011.]

75 Years of Looking Forward: The Anniversary Show. The San Francisco Museum of Modern Art (SFMOMA), San Francisco, CA. 19 Dec. 2009 – 16 Jan. 2011. Organized by Janet Bishop, Corey Keller, and Sarah Roberts.

Paired, Gold: Felix Gonzalez-Torres and Roni Horn. Solomon R. Guggenheim Museum, New York, NY. 2 Oct. 2009 – 2 Jan. 2010. Cur. Nancy Spector.

Floating a Boulder: Works by Felix Gonzalez-Torres and Jim Hodges. FLAG Art Foundation, New York, NY. 1 Oct. 2009 – 31 Jan. 2010. Cur. Jim Hodges.

Passageworks: Contemporary Art from the Collection. The San Francisco Museum of Modern Art (SFMOMA), San Francisco, CA. 25 Oct. 2008 – 19 Jan. 2009. Cur. Tara McDowell

Permanent Collection Installation. The Art Institute of Chicago, Chicago, IL. 2008.

Think with the Senses, Feel with the Mind: Art in the Present Tense. The Italian Pavilion and Giardini della Biennale, 52nd International Art Exhibition, La Biennale di Venezia [The Venice Biennial], Venice, Italy. 10 Jun. – 21 Nov. 2007. Cur. Robert Storr. Catalogue.

Collection Remixed: Corporeal Intelligence. The Bronx Museum of the Arts, Bronx, New York, NY. 3 Feb. – 29 May 2005. Cur. Amy Rosenblum Martin. Catalogue.

Passasjer: Betrakteren som Deltaker [Passenger: The Viewer as Participant]. Astrup Fearnley Muséet for Moderne Kunst, Oslo, Norway. 19 Jan. – 21 Apr. 2002. Cur. Ǿystein Ustvedt. Catalogue.

Sin Título, Caracas/Félix Gonzalez-Torres. El Museo Alejandro Otero, Caracas, Venezuela. 2 Apr. – 9 Jul. 2000. Cur. Carlos Basualdo. [Second venue of Sin Título, Bogotá. Banco de la República, Biblioteca Luis Ángel Arango, Bogotá, Colombia. 10 Nov. 1999 – 16 Jan. 2000.]

Let's Entertain: Life's Guilty Pleasures. Walker Art Center, Minneapolis, MN. 12 Feb. – 30 Apr. 2000. Cur. Philippe Vergne. Catalogue. [Travels to: Portland Art Museum, Portland, OR. 7 Jul. – 17 Sep. 2000; Centre Pompidou, Paris, France. 15 Nov. 2000 – 8 Jan. 2001. Shown under the title Au-delà du spectacle; Kunstmuseum Wolfsburg, Wolfsburg, Germany. 17 Mar. – 15 Jul. 2001. Shown under the title Let's Entertain: Kunst Macht Spaß; Museo Rufino Tamayo, Mexico City, Mexico. 6 Jun. 2001 – 8 Aug. 2001; Miami Art Museum (MAM), Miami, FL. 13 Sep. – 18 Nov. 2001.]

Sin Título, Bogotá. Banco de la República, Biblioteca Luis Ángel Arango, Bogotá, Colombia. 10 Nov. 1999 – 16 Jan. 2000. Cur. Carlos Basualdo. Catalogue. [Travels to: El Museo Alejandro Otero, Caracas, Venezuela. 2 Apr. – 9 Jul. 2000. Shown under the title Sin Título, Caracas/Félix Gonzalez-Torres; Museu de Arte Moderna, São Paulo, Brazil. 9 Aug. – 9 Sep. 2001. Shown under the title Sem Titulo.]

Insertions. Nordiska muséet and Tekniska muséet [Swedish National Museum of Science and Technology], Stockholm, Sweden. 16 May – 12 Jul. 1998. Cur. Carlos Basualdo. Catalogue. [As part of the ARKIPELAG art festival. 16 Jan. – 29 Nov. 1998.]

Felix Gonzalez-Torres: Zwei Installationen [Two installations]. Realismusstudio der Neue Gesellschaft für Bildende Kunst (NGBK), Berlin, Germany. 3 Aug. – 1 Sep. 1996. Cur. Frank Wagner.
