= Materiality =

Materiality can refer to distinct concepts in different professions and areas of study:

- Materiality (architecture)
- Materiality (auditing), relating to the importance of an amount, transaction, or discrepancy
- Materiality (law), a legal term that has different meanings depending on context
- Materiality (social sciences and humanities), the notion that the physical properties of a cultural artifact have consequences for how the object is used

== See also ==
- Material (disambiguation)
- Materialism (disambiguation)
- Materialization (disambiguation)
