= Dematerialization =

Dematerialization may refer to:

- Dematerialization (art), an idea in conceptual art where the art object is no longer material
- Dematerialization (economics), the reduction in the quantity of materials required to serve economic functions (doing more with less)
- Dematerialization (products), using less or no material to deliver the same level of functionality
- Dematerialization (securities), moving from handling paper securities certificates to book form, usually electronic
  - Demat account, a type of banking account in India where paper-based physical shares are stored electronically
- Teleportation, theoretical movement of objects without traveling through space

== See also ==
- Materialization (disambiguation)
