= Materialization =

Materialization may refer to:

- Materialization (paranormal), the creation or appearance of matter from unknown sources
- Materialization, an action involving energy to matter conversion:
  - Dematerialization and rematerialization, two theorized stages of teleportation
  - Materialization of fantasy environments and partners via the holodeck in the Star Trek series
  - Materialization of food and other substances by the Replicator (Star Trek)
- Materialization, creating a materialized view in a relational database
- Materialization, the process of creating an embodiment of an idea, such as a prototype
- Materialize CSS, the responsive front-end CSS library based on Google's Material Design
- Materialization, one of the commands that can be used on the virtual world of "Lyoko" in the French animated series, Code Lyoko.

== See also ==
- Dematerialization (disambiguation)
- Materiality (disambiguation)
