= Group Material =

Group Material was a group of conceptual artists and an exhibition space, active from 1979 to 1996, which included Jenny Holzer, Julie Ault, Barbara Kruger, Louise Lawler, Félix González-Torres, Hans Haacke, and others as members and participants.

The group operated a gallery space on the Lower East Side of Manhattan, where exhibitions such as 1981's The People's Choice (Arroz con Mango) took place. The People's Choice consisted of more than a hundred objects loaned from neighborhood residents, often accompanied by a personal story about the object. Later, the group moved to headquarters on 26th Street in Manhattan and created exhibitions and installations in a number of locations throughout the US and occasionally in Germany.

Group Material participated in the 1985 Whitney Biennial with their show Americana, which included appliances and pop music alongside historical artworks.

Group Material also had an active program of exhibitions/installations hosted by other institutions. Notably, from September 1988 through January 1989, Group Material organized a series of four installations with accompanying "town meetings" at the Dia Art Foundation in New York, NY. The series of installations was entitled Democracy with the four sub-themes of Education, Politics and Election, Cultural Participation and AIDS and Democracy: A Case Study. Each of the town meetings consisted of a presentation of information on that particular installation followed by an open forum where visitors participated in discussions of relevant questions posed by Group Material.

The group used advertising space in a number of their works and exhibitions, including placing artworks as ads in newspapers, on billboards and buses, and on subway platforms. Notably, in 1988, the group created a project with the Public Art Fund called Inserts, which took the form of an advertising supplement to The New York Times. The supplements were distributed in parts of Brooklyn and Manhattan. A copy of the supplements is included in the collection of the Museum of Modern Art.

The group's archive is held in New York University's Fales Library Special Collections.

== Exhibitions ==
Chronological list of exhibitions and performances

- October 4–27, 1980 "Inaugural Exhibition"
- November 4–11, 1980 "The Salon Election of '80"
- November 22-December 21, 1980 "ALIENATION"
- January 10-February 1, 1981 "The People's Choice (Arroz con Mango)"
- February 14-March 9, 1981 "It's a Gender Show!"
- March 7, 1981 "Revolting Music"
- March 21-April 20, 1981 "Consumption: Metaphor, Pastime, Necessity"
- May 2-June 4, 1981 "Facere/Fascis"
- June 14–30, 1981 "Atlanta: An Emergency Exhibition"
- July 11, 1981 "Eat This Show"
- October 31-November 28, 1981 "Enthusiasm!"
- December 10, 1981 – January 10, 1982 "M5", Interior bus advertisements, Fifth Avenue bus lines, New York
- April 16, 1982 "DA ZI BAOS," 14th Street and Park Avenue South, Union Square, New York
- March 25-May 1, 1982 "Works on Newspaper"
- May 29-July 17, 1982 "Primer (for Raymond Williams)"
- June 19-July 9, 1982 "Luchar!: An Exhibition for the People of Central America"
- April 14, 1982 "Revolutionary Fine Arts," Taller Latinoamericano, New York
- September 1–30, 1983 "Subculture," Interior advertisements, IRT subway trains, New York. Concurrent exhibition held at Taller Latinoamericano, New York
- January 22-March 18, 1984 "Timeline: A Chronicle of U.S. Intervention in Central and Latin America"
- January 11-February 8, 1985 "A.D.: Christian Influence in Contemporary Culture"
- March 21-June 9, 1985 "Americana"
- April 27-May 25, 1985 "Democracy Wall"
- 1985-1986 "MASS," various locations: Hallwalls, Buffalo, New York; The New Museum of Contemporary Art, New York; Los Angeles Contemporary Exhibitions, Los Angeles; Artspace, Sydney Australia, and others
- September 1-October 12, 1985 "Messages to Washington"
- November 7-December 19, 1985 "Alarm Clock," "The Other America"
- February 22-March 22, 1986 "Liberty & Justice"
- May 24-June 14, 1986 "Arts and Leisure"
- February 6–28, 1987 "Resistance (Anti-Baudrillard)"
- June 12-September 20, 1987 "The Castle," "documenta 8"
- May 22, 1988 "Inserts," Advertising supplement to the Sunday New York Times
- September, 1988-January, 1989 "Democracy"
- October 1-November 14, 1987 "Constitution"
- September 15-October 8, 1988 "Democracy: Education"
- October 15-November 12, 1988 "Democracy: Politics and Election"
- November 19-December 10, 1988 "Democracy: Cultural Participation"
- December 19, 1968 – January 14, 1989 "Democracy: AIDS and Democracy: A Case Study"
- December 16, 1988 – February 13, 1989 "AIDS & Democracy" a.k.a. "Elegy"
- June 1-December 1, 1989 "Unisex"
- October 14-November 26, 1989 "Shopping Bag"
- November 11, 1989 – January 28, 1990 "AIDS Timeline"
- February 23-March 30, 1990 "Your Message Here," Billboard project
- June 26-July 5, 1990 "Democracy Poll," Insert in Der Togesspiegel, U-Bahn station, billboards, and an electronic billboard
- September 1–30, 1990 "AIDS & Insurance," Exterior bus advertisement
- September 30-November 18, 1990 "AIDS Timeline"
- October 26, 1990 – January 13, 1991 "Collaboration" a.k.a. "Economics: Oberlin Project," "Social Studies: 4+4 Young Americans"
- April 19-June 23, 1991 "AIDS Timeline," New York City
- December 17–20, 1991 "Cash Prize"
- October 8-December 31, 1993 "Tomorrow"
- October 19, 1993 – January 23, 1994 "Democracy Wall"
- May 6-June 18, 1995 "Market"
- June 7–23, 1996 "Program"

== Associated Artists ==
- Jenny Holzer
- Julie Ault
- Félix González-Torres
- Barbara Kruger
- Louise Lawler
- Carrie Mae Weems
- Mike Glier
- Nancy Spero
- Nancy Linn
- Hans Haacke
- Richard Prince
- Doug Ashford
- Tim Rollins (member from 1979-1987)
