= Material (disambiguation) =

A material is a chemical substance or mixture of substances that constitutes an object.

Material(s) or The Material may also refer to:

== Music ==
- Material (band), an American band led by Bill Laswell 1979–1999
- The Material, an American rock band formed in 2005
- Material (Aco album), 2001
- Material (Blaqk Audio album) or the title song, 2016
- Material (Casiopea album), 1999
- Material (Moebius & Plank album), 1981
- Material, by Yuna, 2015
- Material, an EP by Leæther Strip, 1995
- "Material", by Shea Couleé from 8, 2023

== Other uses ==
- Material (accounting), whether a financial matter is significant
- Material (chess), a player's pieces and pawns on the board
- Material, in textiles a term for cloth or fabric
- Material (film), a 2012 South African film
- Materials (journal), a journal of materials science
- Material, a character in the video game series Variable Geo
- Material Design, a design language developed by Google in 2014
- Content (media), sometimes called material

== See also ==
- Materiality (disambiguation)
- Materiel, commercial or military equipment and supplies
