= "Untitled" (Perfect Lovers) =

Artworks created by Félix González-Torres

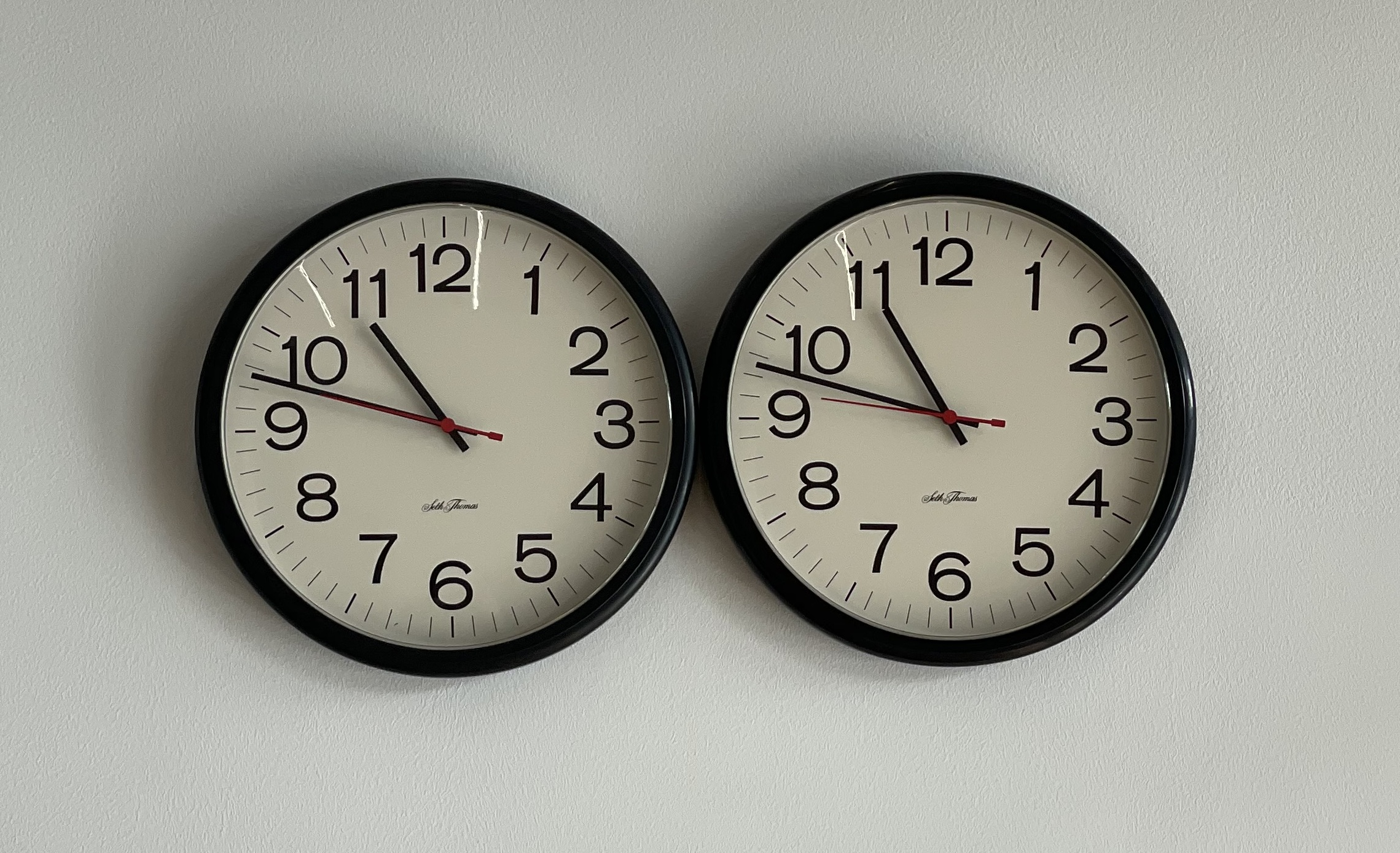
- "Untitled" (Perfect Lovers) (1987-1990) at Glenstone in 2023. The second hands have become out of sync.
- Artist: Félix González-Torres
- Year: 1987-1990
- Medium: Wall clocks
- Dimensions: Original clocks: 13 1/2 in. diameter each (34.29 cm)
- Location: Dallas Museum of Art; Glenstone; Wadsworth Atheneum

"Untitled" (Perfect Lovers)
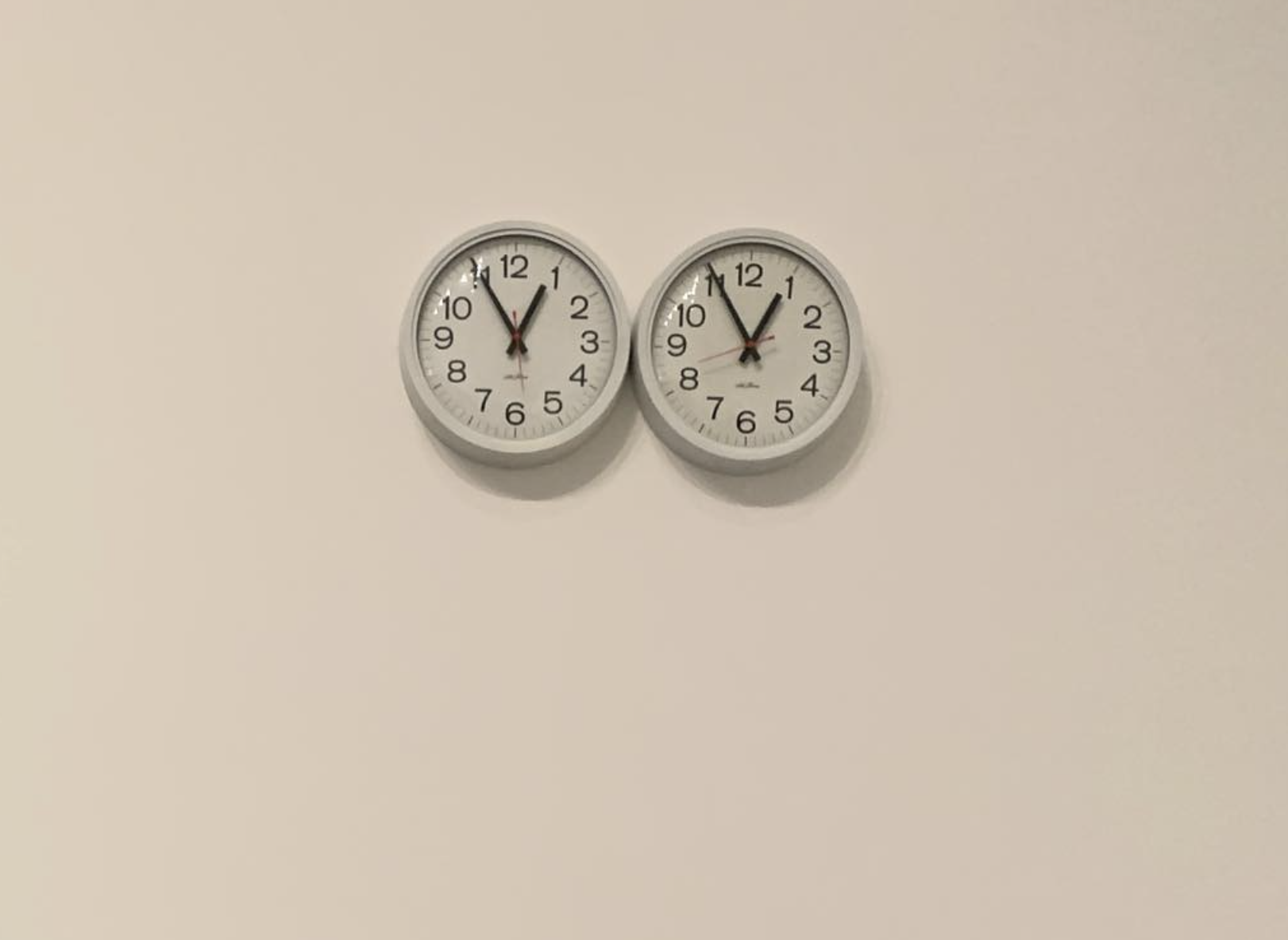
- "Untitled" (Perfect Lovers) (1991) at the Museum of Modern Art in 2022
- Artist: Félix González-Torres
- Year: 1991
- Medium: Wall clocks and paint on wall
- Dimensions: Original clocks: 14 in. diameter each (35.56 cm)
- Location: Museum of Modern Art, New York

"Untitled" (Perfect Lovers) is the title of two different artworks created by Félix González-Torres. Each of the artworks consists of two identical wall clocks hung side-by-side so that they are touching. When installed the clocks are initially set to the same time but may fall out of sync over the course of an exhibition. "Untitled" (Perfect Lovers) (1987-1990) consists of two wall clocks with black rims; this work is an edition of three, plus one artist's proof. A separate, unique work, "Untitled" (Perfect Lovers) (1991), similarly consists of two identical wall clocks but with white rims instead of black, and includes the option of painting the wall on which the clocks are hung light blue.

One of González-Torres' most famous works, it has appeared in over 75 exhibitions and has inspired multiple homages. When included in exhibitions and similar establishments it must adhere to specific parameters specified by González-Torres such as the clocks having to be the same type/dimensions.

== Description and installation parameters ==
González-Torres specified installations parameters for "Untitled" (Perfect Lovers). The work consists of two identical commercial wall clocks displayed side-by-side so that they are touching, ideally installed above head height where a wall clock would typically hang on the wall. The original clocks measure 13 1/2 in. each in diameter. The clocks must be of exactly the same dimensions and design/type.

The clocks must be set to the same time initially though they may fall out of sync over the course of an exhibition. If one or both of the clocks stops functioning, the clocks are deinstalled and repaired, then reinstalled and reset to the same time, allowing the piece to theoretically last forever.

Matthew Isherwood said that "like all of Torres's work, "Untitled" (Perfect Lovers) uses materials that could be considered everyday or mundane to extend and explore queer personal desire". Several of González-Torres' artworks including "Untitled" (Double Portrait), a paper stack work printed with two side-by-side gold rings, "Untitled" (March 5) #1 (1991), a work consisting of two round mirrors installed side-by-side, and "Untitled" (Sagitario), 1994-1995, two side-by-side circular pools of water, incorporate a visual motif of paired circles similar to "Untitled" (Perfect Lovers).

Three of the four editions of "Untitled" (Perfect Lovers) (1987-1990) are owned by public collections: the Dallas Museum of Art; Glenstone, Potomac, Maryland; and the Wadsworth Atheneum, Hartford, Connecticut. The fourth is in a private collection.

Following Laycock's death in 1991, the artist created a nearly identical work by the same name. "Untitled" (Perfect Lovers) (1991) similarly consists of two identical wall clocks but also includes light blue paint, which the exhibitor can choose to use to paint the wall of the installation location. The later work is owned by the Museum of Modern Art, New York, and was formally considered by the artist to be a separate work of art from "Untitled" (Perfect Lovers) (1987-1990).

== Various interpretations ==
With "Untitled" (Perfect Lovers) González-Torres wanted the audience to infer their own meaning. Margarita Vega, noted that "What differentiates "Untitled" (Perfect Lovers) from regular clocks is nothing physical, but rather the assignment of function that will be reflected on some kind of status indicators". Art critic Robert Storr expanded on this, writing:

The meaning of the image hinges on the projected fantasy of the person who stands below and looks up at an enlargement of the most eroticized zone of their everyday lives, the psychological site of their greatest longing, insecurity and discomfort, the nearly neutral screen on which memories or expectations of happiness, frustration, or deprivation can be played in the mind's eye.

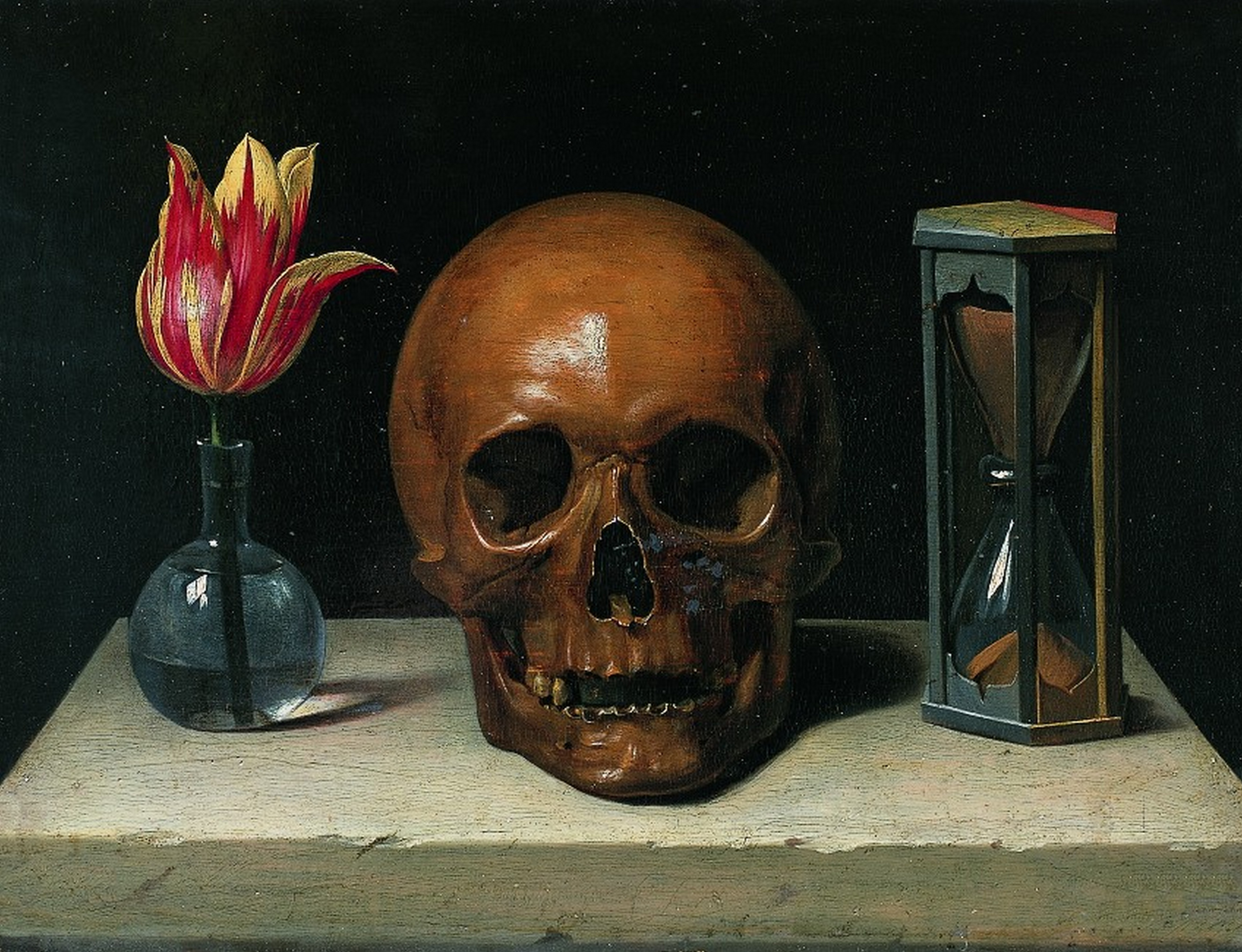
The piece has been described as a vanitas and memento mori. Pictured: Philippe de Champagne's Still-Life with a Skull, an example of a vanitas painting.

An ambiguous work of art, many have interpreted the works to be a commentary on González-Torres' partner's struggle with acquired immune deficiency syndrome (AIDS) and death at large. In 1987, González-Torres' partner Ross Laycock was diagnosed with AIDS. (Note: Laycock was likely feeling the effects of HIV before his diagnosis.) In a letter sent to Laycock in 1988, he showed a rough sketch of the piece, entitled merely Lovers. In the letter, González-Torres ruminates about time, writing:

Dont [sic] be afraid of the clocks, they are our time, the time has been so generous to us. We imprinted time with the sweet taste of victory. We conquered fate by meeting at a certain TIME in a certain space. We are a product of the time, therefore we give back credit were [sic] it is due: time.
We are synchronized, now and forever.
I love you.

The piece can be interpreted as a protest against the censorship of "gay art", knowing that it would be difficult for critics to show that "money is being expended for the promotion of homosexual art", with a work of art so simplistic and abstract in nature. According to Shawn Diamond, the piece was created to "memorialize the love he shared", with Laycock. González-Torres said on the piece:

Time is something that scares me … or used to. This piece made with the two clocks was the scariest thing I have ever done. I wanted to face it. I wanted those two clocks right in front of me, ticking.

Public Delivery stated that the two clocks represent "two mechanical heartbeats", commenting on "personal loss as well as the temporal nature of life". Museum curator Jasper Sharp believed the piece to be a memento mori which represents the short-lived nature of life. Catherine Ruello shared similar sentiments, saying that it "involves the themes of 'vanitas'." Director of the Art Institute of Chicago James E. Rondeau noted that it was start of González-Torres' "examination of coupling and mortality".

Adair Rounthwaite noted that González-Torres' use of a clock, an item which only matters to the living, is a "visual metaphor for the crossover between that time and the nontime of the dead". Rounthwaite also stated that the time measured represents life itself and that the piece was a response to the trauma of AIDS. Margaret Anne Wojton, said that "The two clicking clocks represented Gonzalez-Torres's vantage point of his anguish as caregiver and survivor." She also viewed the piece as an "existential metaphor", for González-Torres' death anxiety.

Rondeau felt that the stipulation that they're identical was a reference to same-sex couples. Suzanne Perling Hudson said that although "the piece is clearly "about" González-Torres and his partner, it is also about any lovers, be they homosexual or heterosexual, and the reality of impermanence and the threat and fear of imminent loss.

Shawn Diamond believed that the piece "depicted two figures always in proximity but unable to unite and become a single body". Kevin Busit echoed similar sentiments, "They'll never be one... The fabric of their being ensures that eventually they'll end up in conflict." Isherwood felt that because the clocks could be reset, there was a sense of hope and optimism in the work. He also noted that "by connoting his queer identity, rather than "evoking it", González-Torres allows "Untitled" (Perfect Lovers) to become both intimately personal and widely social". Helen Molesworth, chief curator at the Institute of Contemporary Art, viewed it as a metaphor for the relationship between art historian and art itself.

== Exhibitions ==
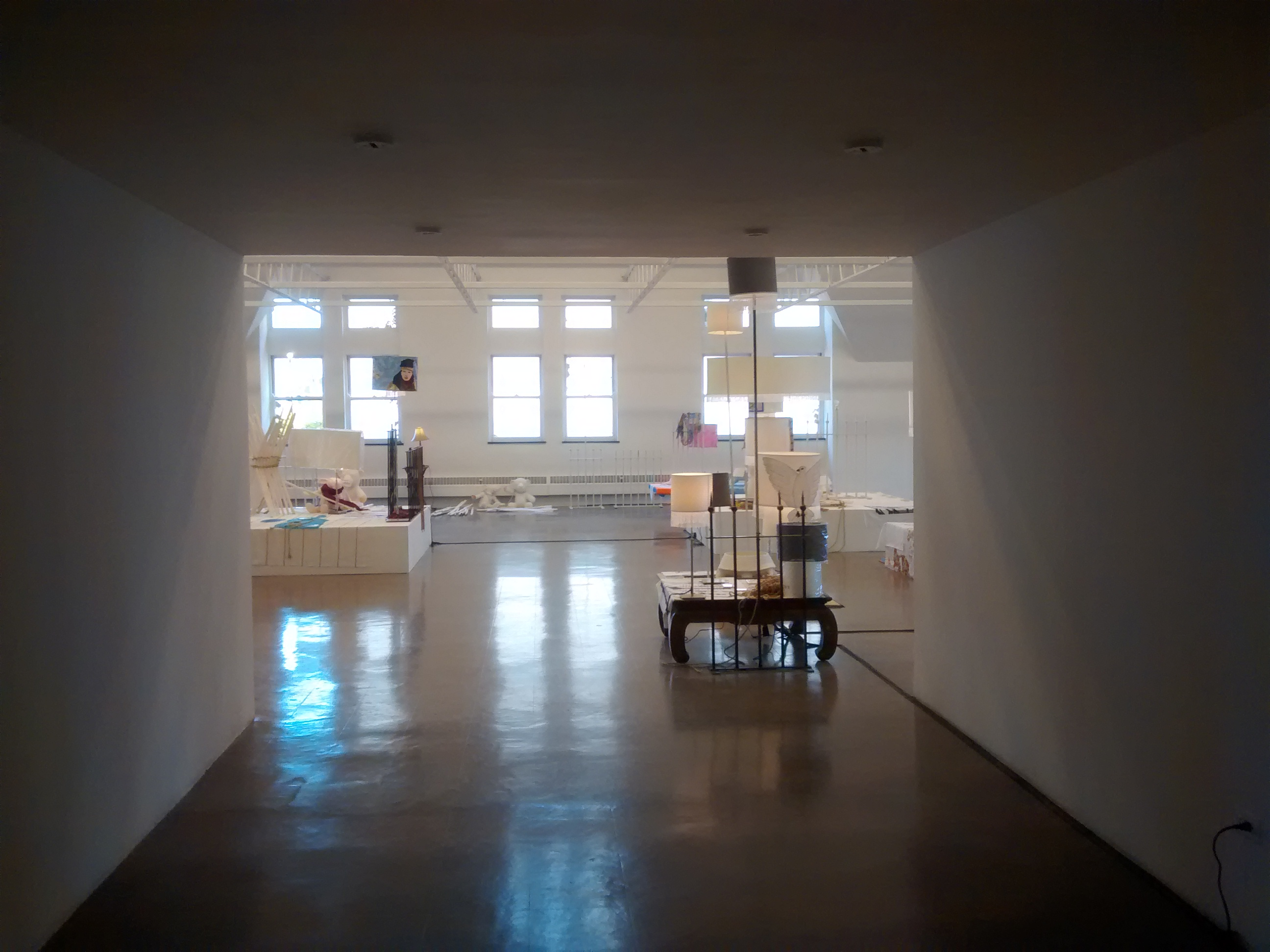
The Renaissance Society in Chicago where the work was displayed in 1994.

"Untitled" (Perfect Lovers) first exhibition was at Jay Gorney Modern Art, New York, from October 20 to November 20, 1990. It was later included in González-Torres' 1994 exhibition, "Traveling," at The Renaissance Society in Chicago. This version was made specifically for the exhibition and was neither dated or signed. As of November 30, 2019 the piece has appeared in 75 exhibitions.

== Legacy ==
According to Public Delivery, "Untitled" (Perfect Lovers) is one of González-Torres' most famous works. In 2002, Tobias Wong produced Perfect Lovers (Forever). Identical in all but one aspect, that being Wong's clocks are synchronized with the U.S. Atomic Clock, ensuring they both stay accurate to within one second over a period of a million years.

In 2008, Welsh artist Cerith Wyn Evans created a remake entitled "Untitled" (Perfect Lovers + 1). The only difference between +1 and the original is the addition of one clock. In 2016, Frieze chose the piece as a "key artwork" from 1991 to 2016.

In 2024, a group of museum workers at Glenstone - which owns an edition of "Untitled" (Perfect Lovers), on display at the time - created and wore buttons featuring clocks inspired by the artwork in support of a staff unionization campaign that was eventually successful.
