= Materialism (disambiguation) =

Materialism is the view that the universe consists only of organized matter and energy.

Materialism or materialist may also refer to:

- Economic materialism, the desire to accumulate material goods
- Christian materialism, the combination of Christian theology with the ideas of materialism, which places a high value on material things
- Cultural materialism (anthropology), an anthropological research orientation first introduced by Marvin Harris
- Cultural materialism (cultural studies), a movement in literary theory and cultural studies originating with left-wing literary critic Raymond Williams
- Historical materialism, Karl Marx's theory of history
- Dialectical materialism, a philosophy of science, history, and nature based on the writings of Karl Marx and Friedrich Engels
- Spiritual materialism, a term coined by Chögyam Trungpa to describe capitalist and spiritual narcissism
- Philosophical Materialism, a doctrine described by Gustavo Bueno which rejects physical reductivism and excludes any possibility of spiritual life without reference to organic life
- Scientific materialism, the view that there are only natural elements, principles, and relations of the kind studied by the natural sciences.
