= Public Delivery =

South Korean art organization

- Formation: 2011
- Purpose: Commission, preserve, promote and interpret contemporary art
- Headquarters: Seoul, South Korea
- Region served: Worldwide
- Executive Director: Martin Schulze
- Website: publicdelivery.org

Public Delivery is an organization for contemporary art, founded in Seoul, South Korea in 2011. It organizes exhibitions, initiate non-institutional art projects and distributes artwork. Its focus is on public space, in a variety of mediums.

In 2012 Public Delivery organized both Asia and the world's tallest mural in Busan, South Korea. Between 2011 and 2014 it organized 73 performances in public space and 37 exhibitions in museums and galleries around the world.

Its founder, Martin Schulze of Germany, currently resides in Seoul, South Korea where he handles the organization in its entirety.

== Projects/exhibitions ==
- Live at the Museum – an ongoing series of video works by Andre Hemer in front of numerous museums around the world
- El Choco – first major solo exhibition by Swiss-Bolivian artist Luciano Calderon taking place in La Paz, Bolivia
- Asia's Tallest Mural – organized a project by German painter Hendrik Beikirch who created a mural 70 meters [230 feet] high in Busan
- Counter Parts – group show in Forum Kunst in Rottweil, Germany
- Silence Was Golden – site-specific and participatory project giving individuals and communities the opportunity to express themselves using golden balloons. Involving Pulitzer Prize winners, National Geographic photographers, the NBA and more.
- Freedumb – pop-up graffiti exhibition taking place simultaneously on six different continents
