= Danh Võ =

Danish contemporary artist

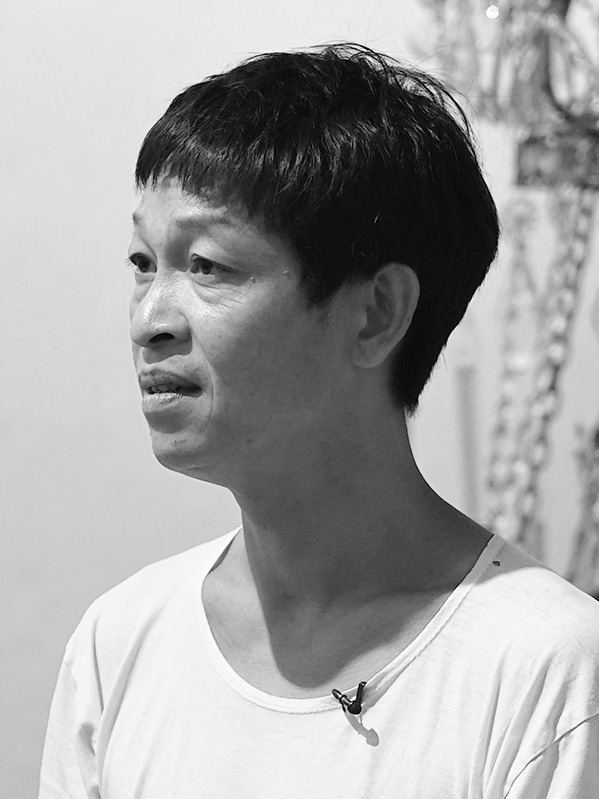
- Võ in 2018
- Born: Võ Trung Kỳ Danh; August 5, 1975 (age 51); City of Vũng Tàu, Bà Rịa–Vũng Tàu province, Vietnam
- Education: Städelschule

Danh Võ (born Võ Trung Kỳ Danh, August 5, 1975) is a contemporary artist of Vietnamese descent. He lives and works in Berlin and Mexico City.

== Early life ==
Danh Võ was born in Vũng Tàu, Vietnam. After the Communists' victory and the fall of Saigon, the Võ family and 20,000 other South Vietnamese were brought in 1975 to the island of Phú Quốc. in 1979, when he was 4 years old, his family fled South Vietnam in a homemade boat and was rescued at sea by a freighter belonging to the Danish Maersk shipping company. The family members settled in Denmark. Their assimilation into European culture and the events that led up to their flight from Vietnam are reflected in Võ's art, which juxtaposes the historical and the personal. When Danh Võ and his family were registered by the Danish authorities, the family name Võ was placed last. His middle name, Trung Kỳ, was recorded as his first name.

Võ moved to Berlin in 2005, after finishing school at Städelschule in Frankfurt, where he went after quitting painting at the Royal Danish Academy of Fine Arts in Copenhagen. He had residencies at the Villa Aurora in Los Angeles (2006), Kadist Art Foundation in Paris (2009) and Villa Medici in Rome (2013). He lives in both Berlin and Mexico City.

== Work ==
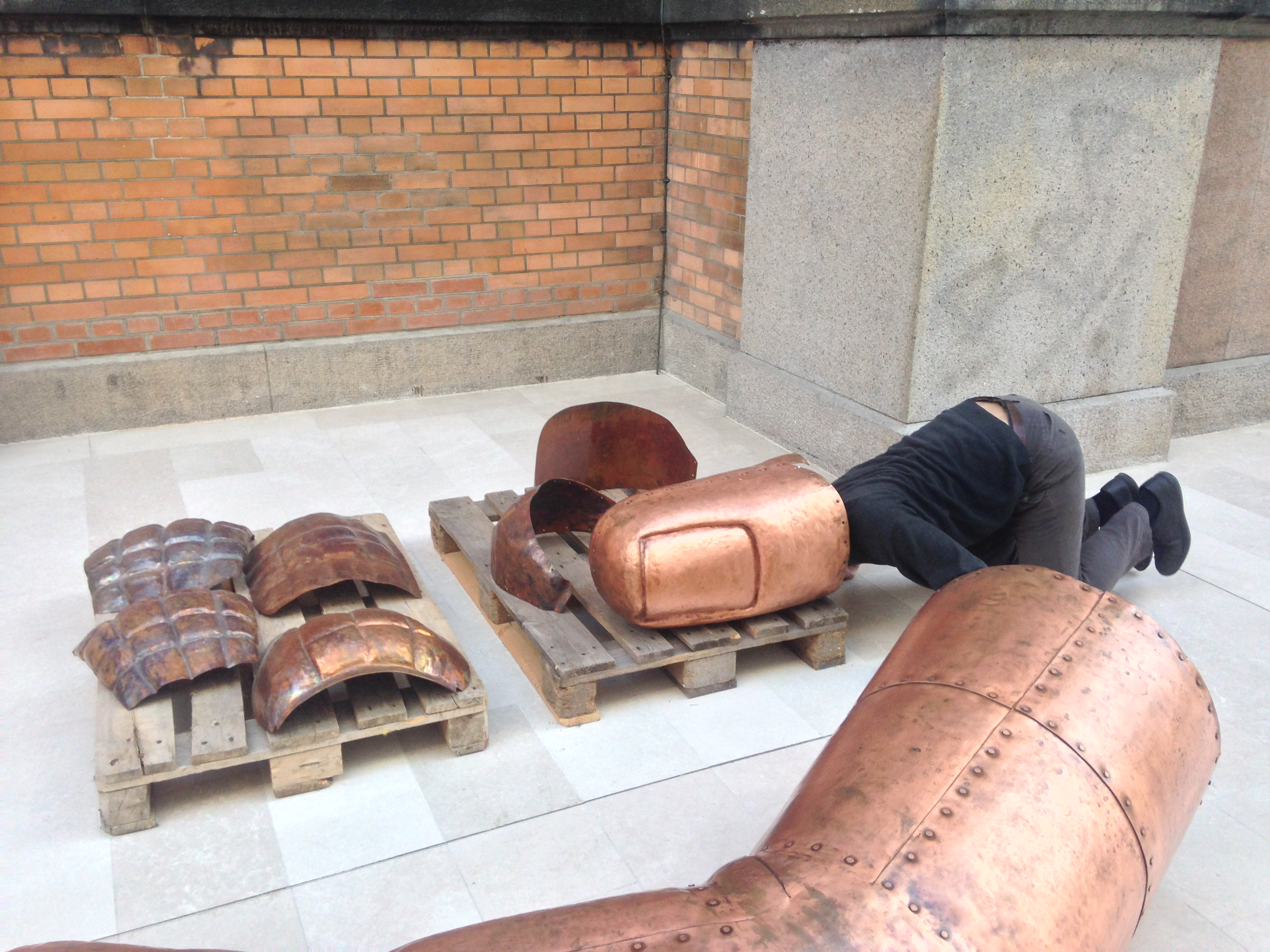
Installation view of "We The People", 2010–2013, at National Gallery of Denmark in 2013.

Võ's installations, which are composed of documents, photos and appropriations of works of other artists, often address the issues of identity and belonging.

The conceptual work Vo Rosasco Rasmussen (2002–) involves the artist's marriage to and immediate divorce from a growing list of important people in his life; after each marriage, Võ retains the last name of his former spouse. His official name is now Trung Kỳ Danh Võ Rosasco Rasmussen. Oma Totem (2009), a stacked sculpture of his grandmother's welcome gifts from a relief program on her arrival in Germany in the 1980s, displays her television set, washing machine, and refrigerator (adorned with her own crucifix), among other items.

For 2.02.1861 (2009–), the artist asked his father Phung Võ to transcribe the last communication from the French Catholic Saint Théophane Vénard to his own father before he was decapitated in 1861 in Võ's native Vietnam; although multiple copies of the transcribed letter exist (1200 as of 2017), the total number will remain undefined until Phung Võ's death.

In Autoerotic Asphyxiation (2010), Võ presents documentary pictures of young Asian men taken by Joseph Carrier, an American anthropologist and counterinsurgency specialist who worked in Vietnam for the RAND Corporation from 1962 to 1973. While in Vietnam, Carrier privately documented the casual interactions he observed, intimate without necessarily being homoerotic, between local men; he produced a substantial photographic archive, which he subsequently bequeathed to Danh Võ.

For his project We the People, created between 2010 and 2012, Võ enlisted a Shanghai fabricator to recast a life-size Statue of Liberty from 30 tons of copper sheets the width of just two pennies. Rather than assemble the approximately 300 sections, the artist shipped the giant elements to some 15 sites around the world after they rolled off the production line in China. From mid May to early December 2014 We the People was shown in New York City under the auspices of the Public Art Fund, with its assembly of parts shared between City Hall Park in Lower Manhattan and Brooklyn Bridge Park in the borough of Brooklyn. While the work was being installed in City Hall Park, a few of its pieces – replicas of the chain links found at the feet of the original Statue of Liberty – were stolen. Today, parts of We the People (2011–2013) can still be found in the permanent holdings of several museum collections in the United States and abroad, such as at the Pérez Art Museum Miami. It was named Frieze named the work No.5 of "The 25 Best Works of the 21st Century".

For a 2013 show at the Solomon R. Guggenheim Museum, Võ conceived a homage to the artist Martin Wong. The installation consists of nearly 4,000 frequently small artworks, artifacts and tchotchkes that once belonged to Wong, crowded into a specially designed gallery lined with laminated plywood shelves. The show's title—I am you and you are too—appeared on Wong's business cards and stamps.

Another 2013 show at New York's Marian Goodman Gallery focused on the personal effects of the late U.S. Secretary of Defense Robert McNamara, the architect of the Vietnam War. Looking to open up a dialogue about shared and private histories, Võ displayed or modified 14 items acquired at a Sotheby's auction—including the pen used to sign the Gulf of Tonkin memo and a 1944 photograph by Ansel Adams.

In 2016, rankled by rising rents in Berlin, Võ and a group of friends – including the artists Rirkrit Tiravanija, Nairy Baghramian, and Haegue Yang – went in search of studio and storage space outside the city and found the 5,000 m^{2} (54,000 sq ft) Güldenhof, a former pig farm in Stechlin, Brandenburg with a set of stone barns that had remained intact since the eighteenth century. Originally meant to be a collaborative compound, the property eventually fell to Võ, who eventually transformed it into his studio from 2017 to 2020.

== Recognition ==
Võ won the 2012 Hugo Boss Prize, the BlauOrange Kunstpreis of Berlin's Deutschen Volksbanken und Raiffeisenbanken in 2007, and was a nominee for the Preis der Nationalgalerie für junge Kunst in 2009.

== Exhibitions ==
Võ had his first solo exhibition in 2005, at the Galerie Klosterfelde in Berlin.

Võ participated in the Venice Biennale in 2013. His work has been exhibited at the Walker Art Center in Minneapolis; the Art Institute of Chicago; the Solomon R. Guggenheim Museum in New York; and the Musée d'art moderne de la Ville de Paris, Kunsthaus Bregenz, Austria, the Kunsthalle Mainz, Germany, among other institutions.

In 2014 Võ shared an exhibition with Carol Rama at the Nottingham Contemporary. On November 14, 2014, his exhibition "الحجارة وادي" (Wād al-ḥaŷara) opened at Museo Jumex in Mexico City. From February 9 through May 9, 2018, the Solomon R. Guggenheim Museum is presenting Danh Vo: Take My Breath Away, the first comprehensive survey of the artist's work in the United States.

M+ in partnership with the Isamu Noguchi Foundation and Garden Museum organized an exhibition of Isamu Noguchi and Danh Võ. (M+ Story) Noguchi for Danh Vo: Counterpoint (16 Nov 2018 - 22 Apr 2019). The exhibition take place in the M+ Pavilion, Hongkong.

Other recent exhibitions include: CAPC, Bordeaux (2018); National Museum of Art Osaka (2020); Secession, Vienna (2021); Mudam Luxembourg (2021); Bourse de Commerce, Paris (2023) and Xavier Hufkens (2023). He was awarded the Blau Orange Kunstpreis der Deutschen Volksbanken und Raiffeisenbanken (2007) and the Hugo Boss Prize (2012).

In 2026 the artist had a Solo exhibition named πνεῦμα (Ἔλισσα) at the Stedelijk Museum Amsterdam (14 February to 2 August 2026).

=== 2015 lawsuit ===
In 2014, Dutch collector and entrepreneur Bert Kreuk filed a suit against Võ, claiming that the artist agreed in January 2013 to produce one or more new works for Kreuk's exhibition, Transforming the Known, at the Gemeentemuseum Den Haag, and that the work would be acquired by the collector after the show. Before the exhibition opened in June 2013, Võ sent an existing work, Fiat Veritas (2013), a cardboard box marked with gold leaf. However, Kreuk said the agreement had been for Võ to create a new work for his collection, expressing a preference for the artist's large-scale Budweiser and American Flag series. In June 2015, a Rotterdam court upheld Kreuk's claim and ordered the artist to create new artwork for the collector within a year. In July 2015, Võ proposed to answer the court ruling by producing a site-specific wall work, as large as Kreuk wished, with the text "Shove it up your ass, you faggot"; subsequently, his legal team reached a settlement and the collector dropped the suit.

== Personal life ==
Vō lives in Berlin and Brandenburg. In 2014, he also renovated a century-old home in Mexico City’s Roma Norte neighborhood. He is in a relationship with the photographer Heinz Peter Knes.
