= Wiels =

Contemporary art centre in Brussels, Belgium

WIELS
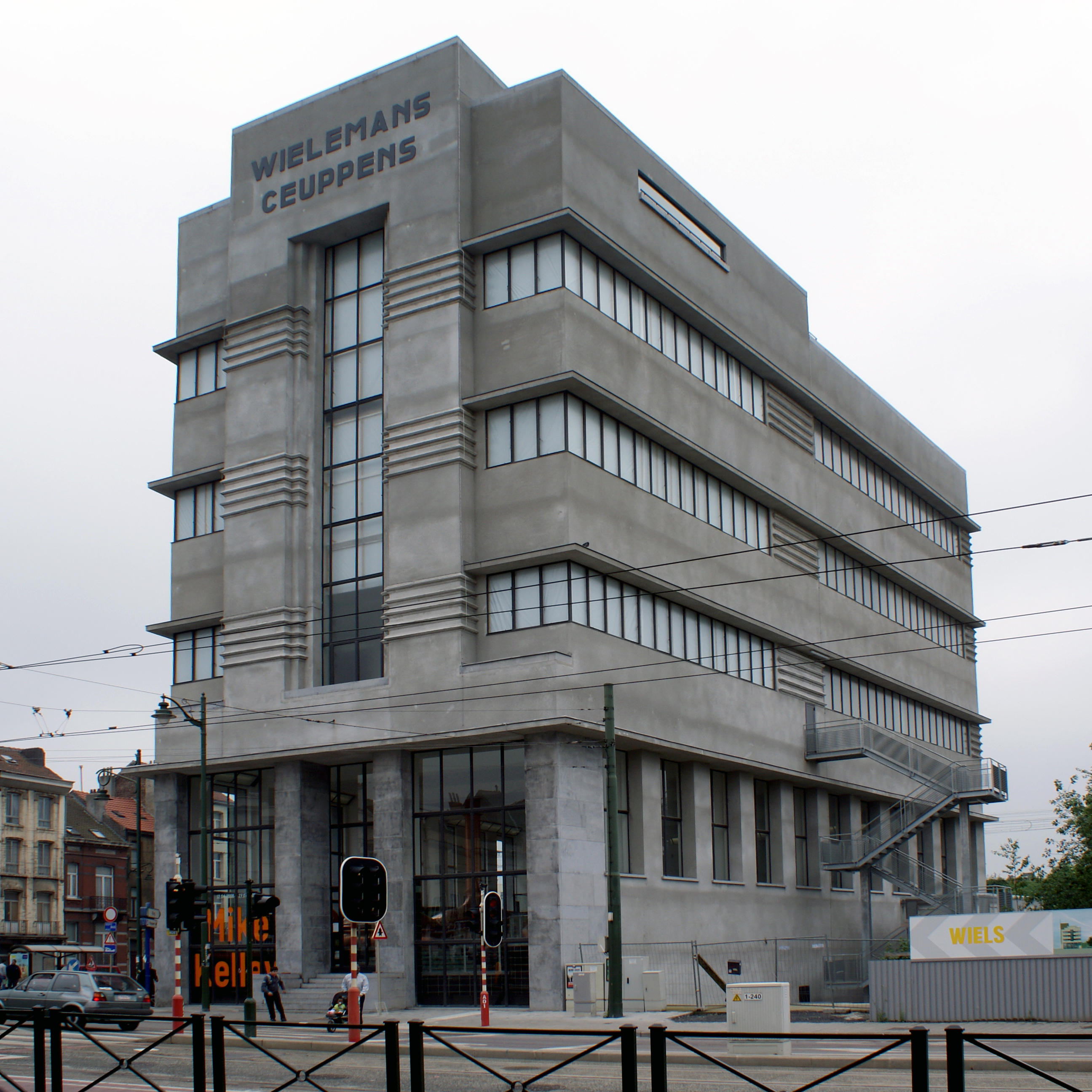
- Exterior of the art centre
- Interactive fullscreen map
- Established: 2007; 19 years ago
- Location: Avenue Van Volxem / Van Volxemlaan 354, 1190 Forest, Brussels-Capital Region, Belgium
- Coordinates: 50°49′28″N 4°19′33″E
- Type: Contemporary art
- Website: www.wiels.org/en

WIELS is a contemporary art centre in Forest, a municipality of Brussels, Belgium. The centre opened in 2007 in the former Blomme building, which belonged to the Wielemans-Ceuppens brewery. It has three exhibition platforms with a total exhibition space of 1,800 m^{2} (19,000 sq ft), an auditorium, studio workshops for artists-in-residence, and a café/foyer and bookshop in the former brewing hall.

WIELS has no collection, instead putting on temporary exhibitions by national and international artists. It hosts nine artist-in-residency studios, for which it receives hundreds of applications every year. For its tenth anniversary in 2017, WIELS organised a group exhibition called the Absent Museum, a reference to the incorrect assumption that WIELS is an art museum.

== Building history ==
In 1931, the Wielemans-Ceuppens family built the Blomme building (named after its architect Adrien Blomme) at 354, avenue Van Volxem/Van Volxemlaan in Forest, to expand its brewing business. At the time, it was the largest brewhouse in continental Europe. In 1988, the brewery closed, and in 1993, the building was given protected status, saving it from demolition. In 2001, the Brussels-Capital Region acquired the building and began renovating it to open WIELS. The name WIELS was derived from Wielemans-Ceuppens. It is one of the few examples of modernist industrial architecture in Belgium.

== See also ==
- List of museums in Brussels
- History of Brussels
- Culture of Belgium
