= Georg (given name) =

- Pronunciation: German: [ˈɡeːɔʁk]; Swedish: [ˈjěː.ɔrj]
- Gender: Male
- Language: German

Origin
- Meaning: "Farmer"

Other names
- See also: Đorđe, George, Georges, Georgios, Georgy, Giorgio, Gorka, Jerzy, Jörg, Jorge, Jørgen, Jürgen, Jüri, Örjan, Yrjö, Yuri

Georg is a male given name in mostly Northern European countries and may refer to:

== In creative culture ==
- Georg Baselitz, German painter, sculptor and graphic artist
- Georg Baselt, German actor
- Georg Blomstedt, Swedish actor
- Georg Böhm, German organist
- Georg Büchner, German playwright
- Georg Brandl Egloff, American composer
- Georg Fabricius, Protestant German poet
- Georg Gerster, Swiss photographer
- George Frideric Handel (Georg Friedrich Händel in German), German composer
- Georg Philipp Harsdorffer, German poet
- Georg Hólm, bassist for the Icelandic post-rock band Sigur Rós
- Georg Løkkeberg, Norwegian actor
- Georg Listing, (born 1987), German bassist (Tokio Hotel)
- Georg Maier, German actor and theatre director
- Georg Malmstén, Finnish singer, composer
- Georg Matthias Monn, Austrian composer
- Georg Muffat, French composer
- Georg, Baron von Örtzen, German poet and author
- Georg Ots, Estonian opera singer
- Georg Albert Ruthenberg, guitarist for the American rock band Foo Fighters
- Georg Solti, Hungarian conductor
- Georg Stahlberg, Estonian opera singer and music pedagogue
- Georg Stiernhielm, Swedish poet
- Georg Philipp Telemann, German composer
- Georg Tintner, Austrian conductor
- Georg Trakl, Austrian poet
- Georg von Trapp, headed the Austrian singing von Trapp family
- Georg Trump, German graphics, typeface and postage stamp designer
- Georg Joseph Vogler, German composer
- Georg Wadenius, Swedish multi-instrumentalist, singer, and composer
- Georg Christoph Wagenseil, Austrian composer

== In science ==
- Georg von Békésy, Hungarian biophysicist, Nobel Prize laureate
- Georg Brandt, Swedish chemist and mineralogist
- Georg Cantor, German mathematician
- Georg Forchhammer, Danish physicist and educator
- Georg Groddeck, German physician whom Freud credits for the Id
- Georg Hartung (1821–1891), German geologist
- Georg Wilhelm Friedrich Hegel, German philosopher
- Georg Major, German Lutheran theologian
- Georg Mohr, Danish mathematician
- Georg Ohm, German physicist
- Georg Pawer (Bauer), German scholar and scientist, the father of mineralogy
- Georg Alexander Pick, Austrian mathematician
- Georg Hermann Quincke, German physicist
- Georg Joachim Rheticus, cartographer and scientific instrument maker
- Georg Wilhelm Richmann, Russian physicist
- Georg Schierscher (born 1942), Liechtenstein mathematician and politician
- Georg Ernst Stahl, German physician and chemist
- Georg Steller, German naturalist
- Georg Sverdrup, Norwegian philologist
- Georg Wittig, German chemist, Nobel Prize laureate

== In politics ==
- Georg Andersson (politician) (born 1936), Swedish politician
- Georg Bissmark (1871–1941), Swedish jurist and politician
- Georg Friedrich, Prince of Prussia
- Georg Gothein (1857–1940), German politician
- Georg von Hertling, Chancellor of Germany
- Georg Michaelis, Chancellor of Germany
- Georg Meri, Estonian diplomat, literary scholar and translator
- Georg Pelisaar, Estonian journalist and politician
- Georg Ritter von Schönerer, Austrian politician
- Georg Schätzel (1875–1934), German jurist and politician
- Georg, Count Palatine of Simmern-Sponheim
- Georg, Crown Prince of Saxony
- Georg, Duke of Hohenberg
- Georg, Duke of Saxe-Altenburg
- Georg, Grand Duke of Mecklenburg-Strelitz
- Georg, Prince of Saxe-Meiningen
- Georg, Prince of Schaumburg-Lippe
- Georg, Prince of Schwarzburg-Rudolstadt
- Georg Leo Graf von Caprivi de Caprera de Montecuccoli, known as Leo von Caprivi, Chancellor of the German Empire

== Other ==
- Georg Reinbold von Aroldingen und Eltzingen, German military officer
- Georg Carl von Döbeln, Swedish soldier
- Georg Gänswein, German prelate of the Catholic Church
- Georg Gaßner (1883–1951), German administrative lawyer
- Georg Hackenschmidt, Estonian strongman, professional wrestler and sports philosopher
- Georg Hellat, Estonian architect
- Georg Linnamäe, Estonian rally driver
- Georg Lurich, Estonian Greco-Roman wrestler and strongman
- Georg Meri, Estonian diplomat, literary scholar and translator
- Georg Mohr (chess player) (born 1965), Slovenian chess grandmaster
- Georg Niedermeier, German association football player
- Georg Olsen, Danish runner
- Georg Simmel, German thinker
- Georg Thomas, German military commander
- Georg, Truchsess von Waldburg, Swabian League army commander
- Georg Werthner, Austrian decathlete
- Spiders Georg, an Internet meme

== See also ==
- Georg (disambiguation)
- George (disambiguation)
- Örjan
