= Gersh =

Gersh may refer to:

- The Gersh Agency, a talent agency
- Gersh College; see Daemen College

Surname

- Darren Gersh, American journalist
- Harry Gersh (1912–2001), American writer and historian
- Squire Gersh (born 1913) American jazz tubist and double-bassist

Given name

- Gersh Budker (1918–1977), Soviet nuclear physicist
- Gersh Kuntzman, American journalist

== See also ==
- Gersz
- Qirsh
- Georg (disambiguation)
- George (disambiguation)
