= Hans Sitt =

Bohemian violinist and composer

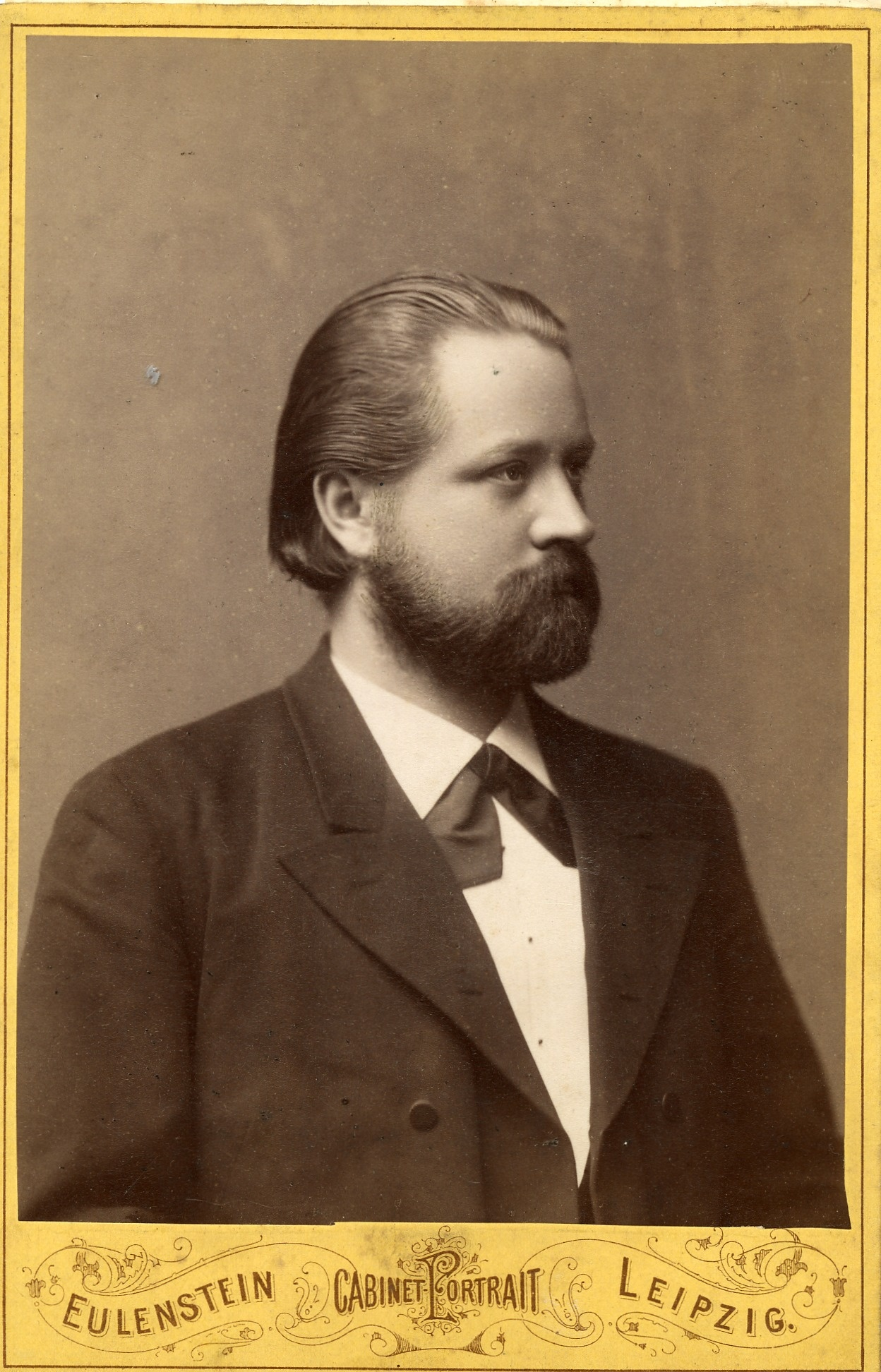
- Sitt in the early 20th century
- Born: Jan Hanuš Sitt; 21 September 1850; Prague, Czech Republic
- Died: 10 March 1922 (aged 71); Leipzig, Saxony, Germany
- Occupations: Violinist, violist, teacher, and composer

Hans Sitt (born Jan Hanuš Sitt on 21 September 1850, Prague – 10 March 1922, Leipzig) was a Bohemian violinist, violist, teacher, and composer. During his lifetime, he was regarded as one of the foremost teachers of violin. Most of the orchestras and conservatories of Europe and North America then sported personnel who numbered among his students.

== Biography ==
Sitt was born in Prague the son of Anton Sitt (originally Szytt) the Elder (1819–1878), a prominent Hungarian-born violin maker. Sitt's musical talent manifested itself early and from all accounts, he could easily have enjoyed the typical career of a "wunderkind" had his parents chosen to exploit him, but they wisely refused this course. Instead, he was allowed to have a normal life and received a regular education at a gymnasium (high school) before being sent to the Prague Conservatory. There he studied violin with Moritz Mildner (1812–1865) and Antonín Bennewitz, and composition with Josef Krejčí (1821–1881) and Johann Friedrich Kittl (1806–1868) from 1861 to 1867. Subsequently, he pursued a successful solo career for a short time. Sitt was appointed concertmaster of the Breslau Opera Orchestra in Wrocław in 1867 at age 17, and in Chemnitz from 1873 to 1880. In addition, he was a conductor of repute, holding positions with orchestras in France, Austria and Germany.

From 1884 to 1921 Sitt held the august position of Professor of Violin at the Leipzig Conservatory, and authored several important studies for violin and viola, some of which are still used. He was conductor of the Leipzig Bach Society (Bach-Verein Leipzig) from 1885 to 1903. Sitt played the viola in the Brodsky Quartet of Leipzig from 1883 to 1895 along with Hugo Becker, Julius Klengel, and founder Adolph Brodsky.

Besides his pedagogical works, Sitt wrote several pieces for violin and orchestra, including six concertos and a number of sonatas for various instruments. The only chamber music of his we have are two piano trios which were composed during the 1880s.

Sitt is responsible for the best-known orchestration of Edvard Grieg's Norwegian Dances, Op.35, an 1881 work for piano duet. His most prominent students include the composers Franco Alfano, Pablo Sorozábal and Frederick Delius, and the conductor Václav Talich. See: List of music students by teacher: R to S#Hans Sitt.

Hans Sitt's elder brother Anton Sitt the Younger (1847-1929) was also a noted professional violinist, and the concertmaster of the Helsinki Orchestral Society, who premiered most of the major orchestral works of Jean Sibelius.

== Selected works ==
=== Orchestral ===
- Nocturne und Scherzo for orchestra, Op. 6
- Gavotte in E minor, Op. 15 (1884); also for piano
- Ouverture zu A. Leschivo's "Don Juan d'Austria" for orchestra, Op. 20 (c.1884, performed 1891)
- Wiegenlied und Gavotte for string orchestra, Op. 48 (1892); also for violin and piano
- Festmarsch, Op. 54 (1895)

Concertante

- Nocturne in F major for violin and orchestra (1882)
- Concerto No. 1 in D minor for violin and orchestra, Op. 11 (1884)
- Concerto No. 2 in A minor for violin and orchestra, Op. 21 (1884)
- Concertino No. 1 in A minor for violin and orchestra, Op. 28 (1888)
- Polonaise No. 1 in A major for violin and orchestra (or piano), Op. 29 (published 1885)
- Concertino No. 2 "in den ersten drei Lagen ausführbar" in E minor for violin (in the first 3 positions) and orchestra, Op. 31 (1889)
- Concerto No. 1 in A minor for cello and orchestra, Op. 34 (1890)
- Concerto No. 2 in D minor for cello and orchestra, Op. 38 (1891)
- Concertstück (Concert Piece) in G minor for viola and orchestra, Op. 46 (1892, orchestrated 1899)
- Concertino No. 3 in D minor for violin (in the first 5 positions) and orchestra, Op. 65 (1896)
- Concerto in A minor for viola and orchestra, Op. 68 (1900)
- Concertino "in den ersten 5 Lagen" in A Minor for violin (in the first 5 positions) and orchestra, Op. 70 (1898)
- Concertino in A minor for violin (in the first position) and orchestra, Op. 93 (1906)
- Romance in G minor for viola and orchestra, Op. 72 (1900)
- Concerto No. 3 in D minor for violin and orchestra, Op. 111 (1912)
- Konzertstück: Allegro appassionato, Romanze und Tarantelle for violin or viola and orchestra (or piano), Op. 119 (1916)

=== Chamber music ===
- Piano Trio No. 1 in G major, Op. 63 No. 1 (composed 1880s)
- Piano Trio No. 2 in B♭ major, Op. 63 No. 2
- Rêverie for horn and piano, Op. 75 No. 2 (published 1902); original for viola and piano

Violin

- Gretchen: Paraphrase aus Liszt's Faust-Symphonie for violin and piano (c.1880)
- Namenlose Blätter for violin and piano, Op. 10
- 3 Albumblätter: Romanesca in B minor, Melodie and Gondoliera for violin and piano, Op. 13 (published 1894)
- 3 Stücke (3 Pieces) for violin and piano, Op. 14 (1884)
- Romanze in G major for cello (or violin) and piano (or organ), Op. 17 (1884)
- 2 Etüden zum Conzertgebrauch (2 Etudes for Concert Use) for violin and piano, Op. 24 (1886)
- Cavatine und Barcarole for violin and piano, Op. 25 (1887); Cavatine arrangement for violin and orchestra (1888)
- Walzer in D major for violin and piano (1888); published in Eulenburg's musikalischer Haus- und Familienkalender (1889)
- Aus der Jugendzeit, 12 Pieces for violin (in the first position) and piano, Op. 26 (1885)
- Lose Blätter (Loose Album Leaves), 10 Pieces for violin (in the first 3 positions) and piano, Op. 37b (1880s); original version for piano solo
- 6 Albumblätter (6 Album Leaves) for violin and piano, Op. 39 (1891, 1896); original version for viola and piano
- 6 Fantasiestücke (6 Fantasy Pieces) for violin and piano, Op. 40 (1891)
- Violin-Duette, sechs leichte instructive Duette (Violin Duets, 6 Easy Instructive Duets) for 2 violins, Op. 42 (1892)
- 6 Stücke (6 Pieces) for violin and piano, Op. 47 (1892)
- Wiegenlied und Gavotte for violin and piano, Op. 48 (1892); also for string orchestra
- Polonaise No. 2 in A major for violin and piano, Op. 49 (published 1893)
- Capriccio for violin and piano, Op. 50
- Romanze und Mazurka for violin and piano, Op. 52 (1892)
- Miniatures, 12 Easy Pieces for violin and piano, Op. 53
- 3 Berceuses for violin and piano, Op. 56 (1894)
- Aus der Jugendzeit: Neue Folge, 12 Pieces for violin (in the first 3 positions) and piano, Op. 57
- Scherzo capriccioso for violin and piano, Op. 59
- 3 Sonatinen (3 Sonatinas) (in C major, A minor, and D major) for violin and piano, Op. 62 (1895)
- 2 Stücke: Barcarolle und Canzonetta for violin and piano, Op. 64b (1894, 1897); original version for cello and piano
- 3 Fantasien in progressiver Reihenfolge (3 Fantasias in Progressive Sequence) for violin and piano, Op. 66 (1897)
- 4 Stücke (4 Pieces) for violin and piano, Op. 67 (published 1900)
- 3 Violin-Vorträge: Romanze, Nocturne, Scherzo-Tarantelle for violin and piano, Op. 71 (1898)
- 20 kleine Vortragsstücke in progressiver Schwierigkeit (20 Short Concert Pieces in Progressive Difficulty) for violin and piano, or for 2 violins, Op. 73 (1900)
- 3 kleine Fantasien über Weihnachtslieder (3 Short Fantasies on Christmas Carols) for violin and piano, Op. 74 (published 1903)
- Zwölf Melodische Vortragsstücke (12 Melodic Concert Pieces) for violin (in the first position) and piano, Op. 78 (1902)
- Jugend-Album, 12 Little Easy Pieces for violin and piano, Op. 79 (1902)
- Bunte Blätter, 12 Easy Pieces for violin (in the first position) and piano, Op. 84 (1904)
- 2 Stücke (Two Pieces) for violin and piano, Op. 87 (1905)
- Suite in D minor for violin and piano, Op. 88
- 3 Stücke (3 Pieces) for violin and piano, Op. 89

1. Albumblatt (Album Leaf) in G major
2. Langsamer Waltzer (Slow Waltz) in A major
3. Marsch (March) in C major

- 3 Duette in der ersten Lage für Anfänger (3 Duets in the First Position for Beginners) for 2 violins, Op. 91 (1905)
- Suite (Präludium, Menuet, Arioso, Intermezzo, Introduction und Gavotte) for violin and piano (1905)
- 3 instruktive Vortragsstücke (3 Instructive Concert Pieces) for violin and piano, Op. 94 (1906)

1. Romanze in A major
2. Bagatelle
3. Polonaise in D major

- Mosaik: Zwölf kleine Vortragsstücke (Mosaic: 12 Short Concert Pieces) for violin and piano, Op. 95 (1906)
- Sechs lyrische Stücke (6 Lyrical Pieces) for violin and piano, Op. 96 (1907)
- 3 Stücke (3 Pieces) for violin and piano, Op. 97 (1907)

1. Romanze in A major
2. Barkarole in G minor
3. Mazurka in D minor

- 3 Stücke (3 Pieces) for violin and piano, Op. 102
- Schüler-Konzertino No. 1 in der ersten Lage (Student's Concertino No. 1 in the First Position) in C major for violin and piano, Op. 104 (1909)
- Schüler-Konzertino No. 2 in den ersten 3 Lagen (Student's Concertino No. 2 in the First 3 Positions) in A minor for violin and piano, Op. 108 (1909)
- 3 Sonatinen (3 Sonatinas) for violin and piano, Op. 109 (1910)
- Schüler-Konzertino No. 3 in den ersten 5 Lagen (Student's Concertino No. 3 in the First 5 Positions) in D minor for violin and piano, Op. 110 (1911)
- Gavotte for violin and piano, Op. 113 No. 3 (1912)
- 3 kleine leichte Duette in der 1.-3. Lage (3 Short Easy Duets in the First 3 Positions) for 2 violins, Op. 117 (1913)
- 3 kleine leichte Duette in der 1.-3. Lage (3 Short Easy Duets in the First 3 Positions) for 2 violins, Op. 118 (1913)
- Concertino in D minor for 2 violins (in the first 3 positions) and piano, Op. 133 (1920)

Viola

- 6 Albumblätter (6 Album Leaves) for viola and piano, Op. 39 (1891); also for violin and piano (1896)
- Concertstück (Concert Piece) in G minor for viola and piano, Op. 46 (1892, orchestrated 1899)
- 3 Fantasiestücke (3 Fantasy Pieces) for viola and piano, Op. 58 (1894)
- 3 Stücke (3 Pieces) for viola and piano, Op. 75 (1901)
- Gavotte und Mazurka for viola and piano, Op. 132 (1919)
- Romanze in D minor for viola and piano, Op. 102 No. 1 (1909); original from Drei Stücke (3 Pieces) for violin and piano; transcription by the composer

Cello

- Romanze in G major for cello (or violin) and piano (or organ), Op. 17 (1884)
- 3 Stücke (3 Pieces) for cello and piano, Op. 33 (1889)
- Scherzo in A minor for cello and piano, Op. 35 (1890)
- 3 kleine Stücke (3 Little Pieces) for cello and piano, Op. 45 (1891)
- 2 Stücke: Barcarolle und Canzonetta for cello and piano, Op. 64 (1894); also for violin and piano (1897)
- Serenade for cello and piano (published 1914)

=== Pedagogical works ===
- Nachtrag zu Henry Schradieck's Tonleiterstudien (Supplement to Henry Schradieck's Scale Studies) for violin (1887)
- Zwölf Etüden für Violine (12 Studies for Violin), Op. 30 (1888)
- 100 Etüden als Unterrichtsmaterial zu jeder Violinschule zu gebrauchen (100 Studies for Use as a Supplement to Any Violin Method) for violin, Op. 32 (1889–1891)

Book I – 20 Etüden in der 1. Lage (20 Studies in the First Position) (1889)
Book II – 20 Etüden in der 2., 3., 4. und 5. Lage (20 Studies in the 2nd, 3rd, 4th and 5th Positions) (1889)
Book III – 20 Etüden, Lagenwechsel (20 Studies in Changing Positions) (1890)
Book IV – 20 Etüden in der 6. und 7. Lage (20 Studies in the 6th and 7th Positions) (1890)
Book V – 20 Etüden, Doppelgriffe (20 Studies in Double Stopping) (1891)

- Tonleiterstudien für Violine in Doppelgriffen zum praktischen Gebrauch beim Unterricht (Scale Studies for Violin in Double Stopping), Op. 41 (1891)
- Praktische Bratschen-Schule (Practical Viola School) (1891)
- 20 Etüden zur Ausbildung in der linken Hand (20 Studies for the Left Hand) for violin, Op. 51 (1892)
- 20 Studien für Violine für vorgerücktere Schüler (20 Studies for Violin for More Advanced Pupils), Op. 69 (1899)
- 24 Etüden für Violine in 24 verschiedenen Tonarten als Vorstudien zu Rode's Capricen zu benutzen (24 Studies for Violin in Different Keys: Preparatory Studies to Rode's Caprices), Op. 80 (1902)
- 20 Etüden für Anfänger in der ersten Lage (20 Studies for Beginners in the First Position) for violin, Op. 90 (1904)
- Technische Studien für Violine (Technical Studies for Violin), Op. 92 (1905)
- 50 tägliche Übungen zur Ausbildung der linken Hand (50 Daily Exercises for the Left Hand) for violin, Op. 98 (1907)
- Dur und Moll: 28 leichte melodische Etüden für Violine (erste Lage) zur Befestigung der Intonation in allen Tonarten (Major and Minor: 28 Easy Melodic Studies for Violin (First Position) for Reinforcement of Intonation in All Keys), Op. 107 (1909)
- 15 Etüden (15 Studies) for viola, Op. 116 (1913)
- 40 besondere Übungen in den ersten 5 Lagen (40 Special Studies in the First 5 Positions) for violin, Op. 134 (published 1921)
- Schule der Geläufigkeit und Fingerfertigkeit: 60 besondere Übungen zur Ausbildung der linken Hand (School of Velocity: 60 Special Studies for Agility of the Left Hand), Op. 135 (published 1921)

=== Piano ===
- Dornröschen Polka (Sleeping Beauty Polka) for piano, Op. 8 (1872)
- Namenlose Blätter (Untitled Album Leaves), 10 Pieces for piano, Op. 10 (1883)
- 2 Ländler, Op. 12 (1883); also for piano 4-hands arranged by Aug. Riedel (1885)
- Gavotte in E minor, Op. 15 (1884); also for orchestra
- 6 Stücke for piano 4-hands, Op. 16 (1884)
- 8 kleine Fantasiestücke, Op. 19 (1884)
- Petite Sérénade for piano, Op. 33
- Lose Blätter (Loose Album Leaves), 10 Pieces for piano, Op. 37 (1890); also for violin and piano

=== Vocal ===
- 5 Lieder (5 Songs) for voice and piano, Op. 3 (1871)
- 2 Lieder (2 Songs) for voice and piano, Op. 18 (1884)
- 3 Lieder (3 Songs) for voice and piano, Op. 22 (1886)
- 4 Gesänge aus "Wanderzeit" (4 Songs from "Wanderzeit") for voice and piano, Op. 23 (1886); words by Karl Stieler
- 5 Lieder (5 Songs) for voice and piano, Op. 36 (1890)
- 3 kleine Lieder (3 Little Songs) for voice and piano, Op. 61 (1894)
- Weihnachtslied (Christmas Song) for voice and piano (1897); words by Julius Sturm
- An Graf Zeppelin for voice (or unison chorus) and piano

Choral

- Zu Strassburg auf der langen Brück’, Swiss Folk Song (1890s)
- 3 Lieder (3 Songs) for mixed chorus, Op. 43 (1891)
- Festhymne for male chorus and orchestra, Op. 55 (1893); words by Fritz Lange (1873–1933)
- Sandmännchen: rheinisches Volkslied for male chorus (c.1900)
- 3 Lieder für Männerchor (3 Songs for Male Chorus), Op. 60 (1894); words by Georg von Örtzen, Gustav Kastropp and Rudolf Baumbach
- Nun brich von deiner höchsten Eiche, Patriotisches Festlied for male chorus (1897)
- 3 Lieder für gemischten Chor (3 Songs for Mixed Chorus), Op. 76 (1901)
- 3 Lieder für Männerchor (3 Songs for Male Chorus), Op. 77 (published 1901); words by Julius Gersdorff
- 3 Männerchore (3 Male Choruses), Op. 82 (1902); words by August Naaf, Felix Dahn and Rudolf Dietz
- Vergebliche Flucht for male chorus, Op. 83 (1902); words by Julius Sturm
- Böhmische Volkslieder für gemischten Chor (Bohemian Folk Songs for Mixed Chorus) (1901)
- Böhmische Volkslieder für Männerchor (Bohemian Folk Songs for Male Chorus) (1901)
- Böhmische Volkslieder für Frauenchor (Bohemian Folk Songs for Female Chorus) (1901)
- Die Krone im Rhein for male chorus, Op. 85 (1903); words by Ernst von Estouches
- Du mit Strahlen mich begleitend for male chorus, Op. 86 No. 1 (1904); words by Friedrich Rückert
- Frommes Wunder for male chorus, Op. 86 No. 3 (1904); words by Fritz Karstedt
- Heimkehr for male chorus (1904); words by Otto Roquette
