= Gersz =

Gersz is a given name. Notable people with the name include:

- Gersz Salwe (1862–1920), Polish chess player
- Gersz Rotlewi (1889–1920), Polish chess player

== See also ==
- Gersh
- Qirsh
- Georg (given name)
- George (given name)
