= List of works by Félix González-Torres =

List of works of art by Cuban-born American conceptual artist Félix González-Torres

Cuban-born American artist Félix González-Torres (November 26, 1957 – January 9, 1996) produced a wide variety of artworks during his lifetime. Comprising pieces that are often open-ended in their formal presentation and range across many mediums, combining elements of drawing, painting, photography, printmaking, sculpture, video, and installation art, González-Torres' body of work is relatively small but influential. The majority of the artist's formal works were accompanied by certificates of authenticity that often also specified - or expressly didn't specify - installation instructions, either directing the owner or presenter of the works to follow installation guidelines, or empowering them to make decisions on how to construct, arrange, or install the works. Given the participatory nature of many of González-Torres' works, including his interactive paper stack and candy spill works that must eventually be replenished, these certificates also sometimes specified how to reproduce or where to purchase the materials needed to sustain the works. For a large number of the artist's works, these certificates are the only permanent component, as the other portions of the work (e.g. piles of candy, stacks of paper, etc.) are purchased or reproduced by the owner or presenter of the work.

Below are chronological, though incomplete, lists of the artist's works. Nearly all of González-Torres' formal works are named some variant of "Untitled", with the quotation marks a formal element of the title; many different works across different mediums have identical titles. Full medium descriptions, work dimensions, and edition sizes are included with each listing, along with locations in public collections noted where known, to aid in differentiation between works. While several works on these lists were created in collaboration with other artists, these lists do not include works González-Torres created or helped create as a member of Group Material or other named artist collectives.

González-Torres' output can be sorted into three discrete categories, each of which has its own list below: formal works, disavowed "non-works," and "additional material" circulated by the artist. Formal works are works of art completed or conceptualized by the artist during his lifetime that he formally considered to be part of his oeuvre; the majority of these works are extant and owned by public or private collections. The artist's formal works are the most widely known, cited, and exhibited elements of his artistic output. "Non-works" are works that the artist created and exhibited during his lifetime but later disavowed and declared no longer works of art. González-Torres disavowed and destroyed nearly all works created prior to 1988, including nearly all of the work he created while attending university in Puerto Rico and most of his early output from his time in New York. Non-works are assumed to be destroyed unless otherwise noted. "Additional material" comprises sketches, photographs, objects, and other ephemera that had served as precursors to the final physical or conceptual form of formal works, as well as versions of formal works outside of the official editions. The artist circulated these materials with friends, collectors, and other artists, but did not consider them to be formal works of art. Many of the additional materials are nearly identical to formal works by the artist. Additionally, some public and private collections have retained or acquired individual papers from installations of one or more of the artist's endlessly replenishable paper stack works; these individual sheets were not considered works in themselves by the artist and these collections are not included on these lists.

Images of González-Torres' work are subject to copyright by the Felix Gonzalez-Torres Foundation, formed in 2002 by the artist's estate as the sole licensor of copyright. Catalogue numbers are references to the 1997 catalogue raisonné of the artist's work, along with the Foundation's public archival catalogue. Neither of these catalogues include every piece of material the artist created or conceptualized during his lifetime, and these lists may not be exhaustive.

== List of formal works ==
Formal works are works of art deemed to be part of González-Torres' oeuvre by the artist during his lifetime. Three works on this list were conceptualized during the artist's lifetime and executed posthumously. Catalogue numbers for formal works were formatted as a sequential numbered list in the 1997 catalogue raisonné; the corresponding catalogue numbers were amended and re-numbered for the Felix Gonzalez-Torres Foundation's public catalogue, in line with the numbering system from the artist's original gallery catalogue. This list defaults to sorting works by their catalogue number in the Foundation's catalogue.

Many of the works in González-Torres' formal oeuvre were accompanied by certificates of authenticity; six series of works in particular were universally accompanied by these certificates. The certificates for these series - replenishable stacks, candy pieces, billboards, lightstrings, beaded curtains, and date portraits - included extensive language defining the works conceptually and physically. Replenishable stacks, date portraits, beaded curtains, and candy pieces are marked in the Notes column on the full list of works to distinguish them from others.

- Replenishable stacks: Certificates include the original type and weight of paper used for the first manifestation of the work, with instructions to use a similar paper if the original is not available; descriptions of what is printed on the paper and how it was printed; an ideal height at which the stack should be installed; instructions allowing viewers to take individual sheets from the installed work; instructions allowing the owner to replenish the stack; language specifying that individual sheets taken from the work do not themselves comprise individual works of art; and language defining the work as unique by its ownership, explained to mean that it can be manifested in multiple locations at once without its uniqueness being threatened.
- Candy pieces: Certificates include the original type of candy or wrapper used for the first manifestation of the work and the original supplier of the candy, with instructions to use a similar candy if the original is unavailable; an ideal weight at which the piece should be installed and the original installation layout; instructions allowing viewers to take individual candies from the installed work; instructions allowing the owner to install the work in a layout of their liking and to replenish the candies when they see fit; and language defining the work as unique by its ownership, explained to mean that it can be manifested in multiple locations at once without its uniqueness being threatened.
- Billboards: Certificates include the original image for the work; language allowing the owner to install the image as a billboard, concurrently in multiple public outdoor locations as many times as desired, as well as applied directly to a wall indoors in one place at a time, printed to the size of the entire wall; instructions on how to crop the image; requirements for the work to be installed outdoors at least once if borrowed for an exhibition; and language defining documentation of the work as a formal conceptual element, along with requests for owners and exhibitors to document each installation of the work. Three billboard works significantly differ in their conceptual format, as noted in the full list: "Untitled" (Portrait of Austrian Airlines) (1993); "Untitled" (For Parkett) (1994); and "Untitled" (1994-1995).
- Lightstrings: Certificates include technical specifications about the lights, sockets, and cords, with instructions to use similar bulbs if the originals are unavailable; language defining the work as complete when owners choose their own unique configuration and install it; instructions allowing the work to be installed in different manifestations whenever the owner desires; requirements for the bulbs to be replaced as they burn out; and instructions to exhibit the work with all the lights either on or off.
- Beaded curtains: Certificates include the original type, dimension, color, and order of beads used for the first manifestation of the work, with instructions to use a similar bead if the originals are unavailable; instructions allowing the owner to install the work in one or more entranceways into a room; and requirements that the beads hang from the ceiling to the floor and span the width of the entire entranceway.
- Date portraits: Certificates include the original text and years chosen by the artist and owner; instructions allowing the owner to add to or subtract from the original list of text and years, as well as to change the location of the work; ideal installation instructions, with the work painted directly onto the wall(s) just below where the wall meets the ceiling; color and font specifications, with the text to be in silver paint and Trump Mediaeval Bold Italic typeface on a wall color of the owner's choice; instructions allowing the text size to change whenever the work is reinstalled to fit the new location; and language defining the work as unique by its ownership, explained to mean that it can be manifested in multiple locations at once without its uniqueness being threatened.

Abbreviations: AP = Artist's proof; AAP = Additional artist's proof; PP = Printer's proof; CR = catalogue raisonné

Title	Year	Medium	Dimensions	Edition size	Public collection(s)	1997 CR no.	Foundation cat. no.	Notes
"Untitled" (Ischia)	1986	Gold paint and aquatint on paper, framed	20 x 50 in (50.8 x 127 cm) overall; three parts, 20 x 15 3/4 in (50.8 x 40 cm) each	1		1	GF1986-001	
"Untitled"	1986	Framed Cibachrome	9 x 9 in (22.86 x 22.86 cm)	1		2	GF1986-003	
"Untitled" (Wall Street)	1986	Framed C-print	46 1/2 x 39 in (118.11 x 99.06 cm)	1, 1 AP with 2 AAPs	Vancouver Art Gallery	3	GF1986-005	
"Untitled"	1986	Framed C-print	15 1/4 x 17 in (38.73 x 43.18 cm)	2		4	GF1986-006	
"Untitled"	1987	Framed photostat	8 1/4 x 10 1/4 in (20.95 x 26.03 cm)	1, 1 AP with 2 AAPs		5	GF1987-001	
"Untitled"	1987	Glass, rubber, black and white photo, and wooden pedestal	67 x 12 x 12 in (170.18 x 30.48 x 30.48 cm) overall; bottle: 7 x 3 x 2 in (17.78 x 7.62 x 5.08 cm)	1		6	GF1987-002	
"Untitled"	1987	China plates with lacquered c-prints	48 x 60 in (121.92 x 152.4 cm) overall [approx.]; eight parts	1		7	GF1987-003	
"Untested"	1987	Glass bottle, newsprint, and pedestal	53 3/4 x 16 x 12 in (136.52 x 40.64 x 30.48 cm) overall; bottle: 5 3/4 x 2 x 2 in (14.6 x 5.08 x 5.08 cm)	1	Museum of Modern Art, New York	8	GF1987-005	Listed in 1997 CR and Museum of Modern Art collection database as "Untitled", without pedestal
"Double Fear"	1987	Rub-on transfer	4 1/2 x 9 1/2 in (11.43 x 24.13 cm) overall; ten parts	20		9	GF1987-006	Published by the artist
"Untitled"	1987	Acrylic and newsprint on canvas	8 in (20.32 cm) diameter	1		20	GF1987-008	Listed in 1997 CR as "Untitled" (Double Fear)
"Untitled"	1987	C-print jigsaw puzzle in plastic bag	7 1/2 x 9 1/2 in (19.05 x 24.13 cm)	3, 1 AP		10	GF1987-010	
"Untitled"	1987	C-print jigsaw puzzles, framed	92 x 20 in (233.68 x 50.8 cm) overall; three parts; frames: 14 1/8 x 15 7/8 in (35.88 x 40.32 cm) each; puzzles: 7 1/2 x 9 1/2 in (19.05 x 24.13 cm) each	1		11	GF1987-011	
"Untitled" (Just Say No)	1987	Offset print on acetate	11 x 14 in (27.94 x 35.56 cm)	1		12	GF1987-014	
"Untitled" (Double Fear)	1987	Acrylic and newsprint on canvas	8 in (20.32 cm) diameter	1		13	GF1987-015	
"Untitled" (Double Fear)	1987	Acrylic and newsprint on canvas	8 in (20.32 cm) diameter	1		14	GF1987-016	
"Untitled" (Double Fear)	1987	Acrylic and newsprint on canvas	8 in (20.32 cm) diameter	1		15	GF1987-017	
"Untitled"	1987	Framed photostat	8 1/2 x 10 3/8 in (21.59 x 26.35 cm)	3, 1 AP		16	GF1987-019	
"Untitled" (Fear)	1986/1987	Glass bottle and newsprint	6 x 2 1/2 in (15.24 x 6.35 cm)	1		17	GF1987-022	
"Untitled"	1986/1987	Glass bottle and newsprint	8 1/2 x 3 1/4 x 3 1/4 in (21.59 x 8.25 x 8.25 cm)	1		18	GF1987-023	
"Untitled"	1986/1987	Glass bottle and newsprint	5 3/4 x 2 x 2 in (14.6 x 5.08 x 5.08 cm)	1		19	GF1987-024	
"Untitled"	1988	Chromogenic print jigsaw puzzle in plastic bag	7 1/2 x 9 1/2 in (19.05 x 24.13 cm)	3, 1 AP	Whitney Museum, New York	27	GF1988-001	
"Untitled"	1988	Framed photostat	10 1/2 x 13 in (26.67 x 33.02 cm)	1, 1 AP		24	GF1988-002	
"Untitled"	1988	Framed photostat	10 1/4 x 13 in (26.67 x 33.02 cm)	3, 1 AP		23	GF1988-003	
"Untitled"	1988	Framed photostat	8 1/4 x 10 1/4 in (26.67 x 20.95 cm)	3, 1 AP	Hood Museum of Art, Hanover, New Hampshire; Museum of Contemporary Art San Diego; and Tate, London	22	GF1988-004	Listed in 1997 CR as a 1987 work
"Untitled"	1988	Framed photostat	10 1/2 x 11 3/4 in (26.67 x 29.84 cm)	1, 1 AP	Hood Museum of Art, Hanover, New Hampshire	25	GF1988-005	
"Untitled" (Cold Blue Snow)	1988	C-print jigsaw puzzle in plastic bag	7 1/2 x 9 1/2 in (19.05 x 24.13 cm)	3, 1 AP with 1 AAP		29	GF1988-006	
"Untitled" (Cold Blue Snow)	1988	C-print jigsaw puzzle in plastic bag	7 1/2 x 9 1/2 in (19.05 x 24.13 cm)	3, 1 AP		30	GF1988-007	
"Untitled"	1988	C-print jigsaw puzzle in plastic bag	9 1/2 x 7 1/2 in (24.13 x 19.05 cm)	3, 1 AP		31	GF1988-008	
"Untitled"	1988	Chromogenic print jigsaw puzzle in plastic bag	7 1/2 x 9 1/2 in (19.05 x 24.13 cm)	3, 1 AP	Whitney Museum, New York	32	GF1988-009	
"Untitled" (Venezia)	1988	C-print jigsaw puzzle in plastic bag	7 1/2 x 9 1/2 in (19.05 x 24.13 cm)	3, 1 AP		33	GF1988-010	
"Untitled" (Loverboy)	1988	C-print jigsaw puzzle in plastic bag	7 1/2 x 9 1/2 in (19.05 x 24.13 cm)	3, 1 AP		28	GF1988-011	
"Untitled" (Madrid 1971)	1988	C-print jigsaw puzzles in plastic bag and wall lettering	15 x 18 in (38.1 x 45.72 cm) overall; three parts; puzzle one: 9 1/2 x 7 1/2 in (24.13 x 19.05 cm); puzzle two: 7 1/2 x 9 1/2 in (19.05 x 24.13 cm); wall lettering: 1/2 x 3 in (1.27 x 7.62 cm)	1		21	GF1988-012	Listed in 1997 CR as a 1987 work
"Untitled"	1988	Wooden pedestal and photocopy on paper, endless copies	Stack: 6 in (15.24 cm) at ideal height x 11 x 8 1/2 in (27.94 x 21.59 cm) [original paper size]; pedestal: 30 x 12 1/2 x 9 1/2 in (76.2 x 31.75 x 24.13 cm)	1		26	GF1988-013	Replenishable stack
"Untitled" (7 Days of Bloodworks)	1988	Gesso, acrylic, and graphite on canvas	Overall dimensions variable; ideal overall dimensions: 20 x 121 in (50.8 x 307.34 cm); seven parts, 20 x 16 in (50.8 x 40.64 cm) each	1	Rachofsky Collection, Dallas	34	GF1988-015	
"Untitled” (Love Letter From The War Front)	1988	Chromogenic print jigsaw puzzle in plastic bag	7 1/2 x 9 1/2 in (19.05 x 24.13 cm)	3, 1 AP	Museum Boijmans Van Beuningen, Rotterdam, Netherlands (permanent loan); and Whitney Museum, New York	35	GF1998-016	
"Untitled"	1988	C-print jigsaw puzzle in plastic bag	7 1/2 x 9 1/2 in (19.05 x 24.13 cm)	2, 1 AP		36	GF1988-017	
“Untitled” (Klaus Barbie as a Family Man)	1988	Chromogenic print jigsaw puzzle in plastic bag	7 1/2 x 9 1/2 in (19.05 x 24.13 cm)	3, 1 AP with 2 AAPs	Colección Jumex, Mexico City; Hamburger Kunsthalle, Hamburg, Germany; and Whitney Museum, New York	38	GF1988-018	
"Untitled"	1988	Framed photostat	10 1/2 x 13 in (26.67 x 33.02 cm)	1, 1 AP		37	GF1988-019	
"Untitled"	1988	Framed photostat	11 x 14 in (27.94 x 35.56 cm)	2, 1 AP with 1 AAP		39	GF1988-020	
"Untitled"	1988	Framed photostat	10 1/2 x 11 3/4 in (26.67 x 29.84 cm)	1, 1 AP		30	GF1988-021	
"Forbidden Colors"	1988	Acrylic on panel	20 x 68 in (50.8 x 172.72 cm) overall; four parts, 20 x 16 in (50.8 x 40.64 cm) each	1	Museum of Contemporary Art, Los Angeles	41	GF1988-022	
"Untitled"	1988	Chromogenic print jigsaw puzzle in plastic bag	7 1/2 x 9 1/2 in (19.05 x 24.13 cm)	3, 2 APs with 1 AAP	Whitney Museum, New York	42	GF1988-023	
"Untitled"	1988	Chromogenic print jigsaw puzzle in plastic bag	7 1/2 x 9 1/2 in (19.05 x 24.13 cm)	1, 1 AP	Whitney Museum, New York	43	GF1988-024	
"Untitled"	1988	Chromogenic print jigsaw puzzle in plastic bag	7 1/2 x 9 1/2 in (19.05 x 24.13 cm)	3, 1 AP	Whitney Museum, New York	44	GF1988-025	
"Untitled"	1988	C-print jigsaw puzzle in plastic bag	7 1/2 x 9 1/2 in (19.05 x 24.13 cm)	2, 1 AP		45	GF1988-026	
"Untitled" (Me and My Sister)	1988	C-print jigsaw puzzle in plastic bag	7 1/2 x 9 1/2 in (19.05 x 24.13 cm)	3, 1 AP		46	GF1998-027	
"Untitled" (Self Portrait with Sister)	1988	C-print jigsaw puzzle in plastic bag	7 1/2 x 9 1/2 in (19.05 x 24.13 cm)	3, 1 AP		47	GF1988-028	
"Untitled" (Warm Water)	1988	C-print jigsaw puzzle in plastic bag	7 1/2 x 9 1/2 in (19.05 x 24.13 cm)	3, 1 AP		48	GF1988-029	
"Untitled" (Photomugs)	1986/1988	Plastic mug with black and white photograph	4 in (10.16 cm) height; 3 1/2 in (8.89 cm) diameter	20, 2 APs		49	GF1988-030	Published by the artist
"Untitled" (1988)	1988	Framed photostat	10 1/4 x 13 in (26.03 x 33.02 cm)	1, 1 AP		50	GF1988-031	
"Untitled"	1988	Framed photostat	9 x 11 in (22.86 x 27.94 cm)	2, 1 AP		51	GF1988-032	
"Untitled" (1988)	1988	Framed photostat	8 1/4 x 10 1/4 in (20.95 x 26.03 cm)	2, 1 AP		52	GF1988-033	
"Untitled" (Double Fear)	1987-1988	Acrylic and newsprint on canvas	8 in (20.32 cm) diameter	1		Not listed	GF1988-034	
"Untitled" (Loverboy)	1989	Sheer blue fabric and hanging device	Dimensions variable	N/A	Dia Art Foundation, New York	53	GF1989-001	The artist intended for this work to have multiple individual owners as he considered each installation of the work to be its own unique artwork; previously exhibited and published as "Untitled"; "Untitled" (For Ross); "Untitled" (Fear); and "Untitled" (Blue Curtains)
"Untitled" (Paris 1989)	1989	C-print jigsaw puzzle in plastic bag	7 1/2 x 9 1/2 in (19.05 x 24.13 cm)	3, 1 AP		54	GF1989-002	
"Untitled" (Paris, Last Time, 1989)	1989	C-print jigsaw puzzle in plastic bag	7 1/2 x 9 1/2 in (19.05 x 24.13 cm)	3, 1 AP		55	GF1989-003	
"Untitled"	1989	C-print jigsaw puzzle in plastic bag	7 1/2 x 9 1/2 in (19.05 x 24.13 cm)	2, 1 AP		56	GF1989-004	
"Untitled"	1989	Framed silkscreen on paper	16 1/2 x 21 3/4 in (41.91 x 55.24 cm)	250, 10 APs	Art Institute of Chicago; Brooklyn Museum, New York; Museum of Modern Art, New York; Whitney Museum, New York; and Williams College Museum of Art, Williamstown, Massachusetts	57	GF1989-005	Published by Public Art Fund, New York; 161 versions were reclaimed by the artist to form "Untitled" (1991) [GF1991-010]
"Untitled" (Bloodworks)	1989	Graphite, colored pencil, and tempera on paper, framed	12 1/4 x 19 1/2 in (31.11 x 49.53 cm)	1		58	GF1989-006	
"Untitled"	1989	C-print jigsaw puzzle in plastic bag	7 1/2 x 9 1/2 in (19.05 x 24.13 cm)	3, 1 AP with 3 AAPs		59	GF1989-007	
"Untitled"	1989	C-print jigsaw puzzle in plastic bag	7 1/2 x 9 1/2 in (19.05 x 24.13 cm)	3, 1 AP		60	GF1989-008	
"Untitled"	1989	C-print jigsaw puzzle in plastic bag	7 1/2 x 9 1/2 in (19.05 x 24.13 cm)	3, 1 AP		61	GF1989-009	
"Untitled" (Waldheim to The Pope)	1989	C-print jigsaw puzzle in plastic bag	7 1/2 x 9 1/2 in (19.05 x 24.13 cm)	3, 1 AP		62	GF1989-010	
"Untitled" (Key West Weekend)	1989	C-print jigsaw puzzle and Plexiglas pedestal	Puzzle: 7 1/2 x 9 1/2 in (19.05 x 24.13 cm); pedestal: 36 x 10 1/2 x 8 1/2 in (91.44 x 26.67 x 21.59 cm)	1		63	GF1989-011	
"Untitled" (Veterans Day Sale)	1989	Print on paper, endless copies	22 in (55.88 cm) at ideal height x 29 x 23 in (73.66 x 58.42 cm) [original paper size]	1	Milwaukee Art Museum	64	GF1989-012	Replenishable stack; text on paper: "VETERANS DAY SALE"; originally exhibited together with "Untitled" (Memorial Day Weekend) (1989) as "Untitled" (Monuments)
"Untitled"	1989	Billboard	Dimensions variable	1		65	GF1989-013	
"Untitled" (White Legal)	1989	Metal magazine rack and photocopy on paper, endless copies	65 1/2 x 9 3/4 x 4 1/8 in (166.37 x 24.76 x 10.48 cm) overall; paper: 14 x 8 1/2 in (35.56 x 21.59 cm)	1		66	GF1989-016	
"Untitled" (Monument)	1989	Print on paper, endless copies	20 in (50.8 cm) at ideal height x 29 x 23 in (73.66 x 58.42 cm) [original paper size]	1		67	GF1989-017	Replenishable stack; text on paper: "TEN MEN CAME, ONLY THREE RETURNED"
"Untitled" (Bloodworks)	1989	Graphite and tempera on paper, framed	Overall dimensions variable; five parts, 16 1/2 x 15 in (41.91 x 38.1 cm) each	1		68	GF1989-018	
"Untitled" (Memorial Day Weekend)	1989	Print on paper, endless copies	22 in (55.88 cm) at ideal height x 29 x 23 in (73.66 x 58.42 cm) [original paper size]	1		69	GF1989-019	Replenishable stack; text on paper: "MEMORIAL DAY WEEKEND"; originally exhibited together with "Untitled" (Veterans Day Sale) (1989) as "Untitled" (Monuments)
"Untitled"	1989	Paint on wall	Dimensions variable	1	Art Institute of Chicago, and San Francisco Museum of Modern Art (jointly owned)	70	GF1989-020	Date portrait
"Untitled" (Still Life)	1989	Print on paper, endless copies	6 in (15.24 cm) at ideal height x 11 x 8 1/2 in (27.94 x 21.59 cm) [original paper size]	1		71	GF1989-022	Replenishable stack
"Untitled" (Oscar Wilde's Tombstone)	1989	C-print jigsaw puzzle in plastic bag	7 1/2 x 9 1/2 in (19.05 x 24.13 cm)	3, 1 AP		72	GF1989-023	
"Untitled" (New Supreme Justice)	1989	Gesso on canvas	Overall dimensions variable; ideal overall dimensions: 35 x 88 1/2 in (88.9 x 224.79 cm) [approx.]; five parts; part one: 16 3/4 x 14 in (42.54 x 35.56 cm); part two: 23 7/8 x 14 in (60.64 x 35.56 cm); part three: 30 x 20 in (76.2 x 50.8 cm); part four: 24 x 20 in (60.96 x 50.8 cm); part five: 20 7/8 x 20 in (53.02 x 50.8 cm)	1		73	GF1989-024	
"Untitled" (God Bless Our Country and Now Back to War)	1989	Collage on paper, framed	15 3/4 x 65 in (40 x 165.1 cm) overall; four parts, 15 3/4 x 12 7/8 in (40 x 32.7 cm) each	1		74	GF1989-025	
"Untitled" (Blue Cross)	1990	Blue fabric and paper, endless copies, 4 stacks	9 in (22.86 cm) at ideal height x 59 x 59 in (149.86 x 149.86 cm) overall; four parts, 9 in (22.86 cm) at ideal height x 23 x 23 in (58.42 x 58.42 cm) each [original paper size]	1		75	GF1990-001	Replenishable stacks; four stacks arranged in a square
"Untitled"	1990	Print on paper, endless copies, 3 stacks	17 in (43.18 cm) at ideal height x 87 x 23 in (220.98 x 58.42 cm) overall; three parts; first stack: 17 in (43.18 cm) at ideal height x 29 x 23 in (73.66 x 58.42 cm) [original paper size]; second stack: 12 in (30.48 cm) at ideal height x 29 x 23 in (73.66 x 58.42 cm) [original paper size]; third stack: 8 in (20.32 cm) at ideal height x 29 x 23 in (73.66 x 58.42 cm) [original paper size]	1	Museum of Modern Art, New York	76	GF1990-002	Replenishable stacks; three stacks attached to each other
"Untitled" (Loverboy)	1990	Blue paper, endless supply	7 1/2 in (19.05 cm) at ideal height x 29 x 23 in (73.66 x 58.42 cm) [original paper size]	1		78	GF1990-003	Replenishable stack
"Untitled" (The End)	1990	Print on paper, endless copies	22 in (55.88 cm) at ideal height x 28 x 22 in (71.12 x 55.88 cm) [original paper size]	1	Museum of Contemporary Art, Chicago	77	GF1990-004	Replenishable stack
"Untitled"	1990	Print on paper, endless copies	15 1/2 in (39.37 cm) at ideal height x 29 x 22 1/2 in (73.66 x 57.15 cm) [original paper size]	1		79	GF1990-005	Replenishable stack; two stacks attached to each other
"Untitled"	1990	Rub-on transfer	11 in (27.94 cm) diameter	20		80	GF1990-006	Published by the artist
"Untitled"	1990	Print on paper, endless copies	8 in (20.32 cm) at ideal height x 29 x 23 in (73.66 x 58.42 cm) [original paper size]	1	Hamburger Kunsthalle, Hamburg, Germany	82	GF1990-008	Replenishable stack
"Untitled" (Join)	1990	Print on paper, endless copies	36 in (91.44 cm) at ideal height x 28 13/16 x 22 7/16 in (73.18 x 56.99 cm) [original paper size]	1	Rubell Museum, Miami / Washington, D.C.	81	GF1990-009	Replenishable stack; created in collaboration with artist Michael Jenkins (b. 1957)
"Untitled" (Blue Mirror)	1990	Print on paper, endless copies	20 in (50.8 cm) at ideal height x 28 x 22 in (71.12 x 55.88 cm) [original paper size]	1		84	GF1990-010	Replenishable stack
"Untitled"	1990	Print on paper, endless copies	25 in (63.5 cm) at ideal height x 29 x 23 in (73.66 x 58.42 cm) [original paper size]	1		83	GF1990-011	Replenishable stack
"Untitled" (Blue Mirror)	1990	Print on paper, endless copies	71.1 cm (28 in) at ideal height x 73.7 x 58.4 cm (29 x 23 in) [original paper size]	1		85	GF1990-012	Replenishable stack; ideal size formatted by the artist as a metric measurement
"Untitled" (Fortune Cookie Corner)	1990	Fortune cookies, endless supply	Overall dimensions variable; original installation: 10,000 fortune cookies [approx.]	1		86	GF1990-013	Candy piece
"Untitled"	1990	Embossed paper in archival box	8 x 14 x 14 in (20.32 x 35.56 x 35.56 cm)	12, 5 APs	Walker Art Center, Minneapolis	90	GF1990-014	Published by Santa Monica Editions, Los Angeles, and Andrea Rosen Gallery, New York
"Untitled"	1990	Metal first aid kit, paper, and clock	10 1/2 x 7 5/8 x 2 1/8 in (26.67 x 19.37 x 5.4 cm)	1		89	GF1990-015	
"Untitled"	1990	Print on red paper, endless copies	28 in (71.12 cm) at ideal height x 28 3/4 x 22 1/4 in (73.02 x 56.51 cm) [original paper size]	1	Fonds national d'art contemporain, Centre national des arts plastiques, Paris	87	GF1990-016	Replenishable stack; text on paper: "Himmler," "Hate," "Hole," "Helms," (front), "HOW MANY TIMES? FOR HOW LONG? WHY?" (back)
"Untitled" (For White Columns)	1990	C-print jigsaw puzzle in plastic bag	7 1/2 x 9 1/2 in (19.05 x 24.13 cm)	6, 2 APs		88	GF1990-017	
"Untitled" (Shield)	1990	C-print jigsaw puzzle in plastic bag	7 1/2 x 9 1/2 in (19.05 x 24.13 cm)	3, 1 AP		91	GF1990-018	
"Untitled" (Girlfriend in a Coma)	1990	Paint on wall and embossed paper, endless copies	Overall dimensions variable; stack: 12 in (30.48 cm) at ideal height x 29 x 23 in (73.66 x 58.42 cm) [original paper size]	1		92	GF1990-019	Replenishable stack
"Untitled" (A Corner of Baci)	1990	Baci chocolates, endless supply	Overall dimensions variable; original installation: 42 lb (19 kg) [approx.]	1	Museum of Contemporary Art, Los Angeles	99	GF1990-020	Candy piece
"Untitled" (NRA - National Rifle Association)	1990	Print on red paper, endless copies	Original drawing: 20-22 in (50.8-55.88 cm) at ideal height x 29 x 23 in (73.66 x 58.42 cm) [approx.]; original installation: 20 in (50.8 cm) at ideal height x 33 1/4 x 26 1/4 in (84.45 x 66.67 cm) [original paper size]	1		93	GF1990-021	Replenishable stack
"Untitled" (t-cell count)	1990	Graphite, colored pencil, and gouache on paper, framed	19 1/2 x 15 3/4 in (49.53 x 40 cm)	1		95	GF1990-023	
"Untitled" (t-cell count)	1990	Graphite and gouache on paper, framed	19 3/4 x 15 3/4 in (50.16 x 40 cm)	1		94	GF1990-024	
"Untitled" (t-cell count)	1990	Graphite and gouache on paper, framed	19 1/2 x 15 3/4 in (49.53 x 40 cm)	1	Art Institute of Chicago	96	GF1990-025	
"Untitled" (t-cell count)	1990	Graphite, colored pencil, and gouache on paper, framed	19 1/2 x 15 3/4 in (49.53 x 40 cm)	1		97	GF1990-026	
"Untitled" (t-cell count)	1990	Graphite, colored pencil, and gouache on paper, framed	19 1/2 x 15 3/4 in (49.53 x 40 cm)	1	Museum of Modern Art, New York	98	GF1990-027	
"Untitled" (Silver Beach)	1990	Print on paper, endless copies	50.8 cm (20 in) at ideal height x 76.2 x 67.7 cm (30 x 26 2/3 in) [original paper size]	1	Art Institute of Chicago	103	GF1990-030	Replenishable stack; ideal size formatted by the artist as a metric measurement
"Untitled" (Beautiful, in conjunction with Louise Lawler)	1990	Print on paper, endless copies	36 in (91.44 cm) at ideal height x 29 x 23 in (73.66 x 58.42 cm) [original paper size]	1		101	GF1990-031	Replenishable stack; created in collaboration with Louise Lawler
"Untitled" (USA Today)	1990	Candies in red, silver, and blue wrappers, endless supply	Overall dimensions variable; ideal weight: 300 lb (136 kg)	1	Museum of Modern Art, New York	106	GF1990-032	Candy piece
"Untitled" (Death by Gun)	1990	Print on paper, endless copies	9 in (22.86 cm) at ideal height x 45 x 33 in (114.3 x 83.82 cm) [original paper size]	1	Museum of Modern Art, New York	100	GF1990-036	Replenishable stack
"Untitled" (Natural History)	1990	Framed black and white photographs	Overall dimensions variable; thirteen parts, 16 3/4 x 20 1/4 in (42.54 x 51.43 cm) each	3	Des Moines Art Center, Iowa (Ed. 3, photograph A); Rachofsky Collection, Dallas (Ed. 1, complete set); Tokyo Photographic Art Museum (Ed. 3, photograph I); and Walker Art Center, Minneapolis (Ed. 3, photograph F)	107	GF1990-038	Photograph titles: Patriot (A), Historian (B), Ranchman (C), Scientist (D), Soldier (E), Humanitarian (F), Author (G), Conservationist (H), Naturalist (I), Scholar (J), Explorer (K), Statesman (L), Club 21 (M); Ed. 1 and 2 were sold as complete sets which must remain under sole ownership, Ed. 3 was split into its component photographs which were sold individually; all three editions include photograph M (Club 21), but the artist deemed that it should not be exhibited with Ed. 1 or 2 when they are publicly shown
"Untitled"	1982/1990	Newsprint on paper, framed	12 3/4 x 34 in (32.38 x 86.36 cm) overall; three parts, 12 3/4 x 10 in (32.38 x 25.4 cm) each	1		105	GF1990-039	
"Untitled" (Perfect Lovers)	1987-1990	Wall clocks	Overall dimensions variable; two parts, ideally installed above head height; original clocks: 13 1/2 in (34.29 cm) diameter each	3, 1 AP	Dallas Museum of Art; Glenstone, Potomac, Maryland; and Wadsworth Atheneum, Hartford, Connecticut	108	GF1990-040	Consists of two black-framed, battery-operated commercial clocks; separate artwork from "Untitled" (Perfect Lovers) (1991) [GF1991-007]
"Untitled"	1989/1990	Print on paper, endless copies, 2 stacks	26 in (66.04 cm) at ideal height x 29 x 56 in (73.66 x 142.24 cm) overall; two parts, 26 in (66.04 cm) at ideal height x 29 x 23 in (73.66 x 58.42 cm) each [original paper size]	1		104	GF1990-041	Replenishable stacks; text on paper: "SOMEWHERE BETTER THAN THIS PLACE" (first stack), "NOWHERE BETTER THAN THIS PLACE" (second stack); listed in 1997 CR as a 1990 work
"Untitled" (Spaghetti)	1990	Print on paper, endless copies	8 1/2 in (21.59 cm) at ideal height x 58 x 42 in (147.32 x 106.68 cm) [original paper size]	1		102	GF1990-042	Replenishable stack
"Untitled" (Welcome Back Heroes)	1991	Bazooka Bubble Gum, endless supply	Overall dimensions variable; ideal weight: 200 kg (440 lb)	1		109	GF1991-001	Candy piece; ideal weight formatted by the artist as a metric measurement
"Untitled" (The New Plan)	1991	Billboard	Dimensions variable	1		110	GF1991-002	
"Untitled" (Portrait of the Wongs)	1991	Paint on wall	Dimensions variable	1		111	GF1991-003	Date portrait
"Untitled" (Revenge)	1991	Blue candies in clear wrappers, endless supply	Overall dimensions variable; ideal weight: 325 lb (147 kg)	1		113	GF1991-004	Candy piece
"Untitled" (Loverboy)	1991	Silkscreen on cotton t-shirt	Size XL	250	Walker Art Center, Minneapolis	114	GF1991-006	Published by Fundacion Caja de Pensiones, Madrid, in conjunction with El Jardin Salvaje (1991)
"Untitled" (Perfect Lovers)	1991	Wall clocks and paint on wall	Overall dimensions variable; two parts, ideally installed above head height; original clocks: 14 in (35.56 cm) diameter each	1	Museum of Modern Art, New York	112	GF1991-007	Consists of two white-framed, battery-operated commercial clocks and paint on wall; separate artwork from "Untitled" (Perfect Lovers) (1987-1990) [GF1990-040]
"Untitled" (14 Days of Bloodworks)	1991	Acrylic, gesso, and graphite on canvas	Overall dimensions variable; fourteen parts, 20 x 16 in (50.8 x 40.64 cm) each	1		115	GF1991-008	
"Untitled" (Lover Boys)	1991	Candies in silver wrappers, endless supply	Overall dimensions variable; ideal weight: 355 lb (161 kg)	1		116	GF1991-009	Candy piece
"Untitled"	1991	Silkscreen on paper	3 5/8 x 21 3/4 x 16 1/2 in (9.21 x 55.24 x 41.91 cm) overall; one hundred sixty one parts, 16 1/2 x 21 3/4 in (41.91 x 55.24 cm) each	1	Solomon R. Guggenheim Museum, New York	120	GF1991-010	Created with 161 reclaimed versions of "Untitled" (1989) [GF1989-005], stacked at 16 1/2 in height
"Untitled" (March 5th) #1	1991	Mirror	12 x 24 in (30.48 x 60.96 cm) overall; two parts, ideally installed at head height, 12 in (30.48 cm) diameter each	1		117	GF1991-011	
"Untitled" (March 5th) #2	1991	Light bulbs, porcelain light sockets, and electrical cords	Overall dimensions variable; two parts, 113 in (287.02 cm) height each	20, 2 APs	Art Institute of Chicago; Cleveland Museum of Art; Museum of Contemporary Art, Los Angeles; Nelson-Atkins Museum of Art, Kansas City, Missouri; Tate, London; and University of Michigan Museum of Art, Ann Arbor	118	GF1991-012	Published by the artist and Andrea Rosen Gallery, New York
"Untitled" (Ross in L.A.)	1991	Print on paper, endless copies	10 in (25.5 cm) at ideal height x 29 x 23 in (78.4 x 62 cm) [original paper size]	3	Institute of Contemporary Art, Miami; and National Gallery of Art, Washington, D.C.	119	GF1991-013	Replenishable stack
"Untitled" (Portrait of Michael Jenkins)	1991	Paint on wall	Dimensions variable	1	Harvard Art Museums, Cambridge, Massachusetts	121	GF1991-014	Date portrait
"Untitled" (Lover Boys)	1991	Blue-and-white spiral candies in clear wrappers, endless supply	Overall dimensions variable; ideal weight: 355 lb (161 kg)	1	Glenstone, Potomac, Maryland	122	GF1991-015	Candy piece
"Untitled" (L.A.)	1991	Green candies in clear wrappers, endless supply	Overall dimensions variable; original dimensions: 192 x 14 x 1 1/2 in (487.68 cm x 35.56 x 3.81 cm) [approx.]; original weight: 50 lb (22.6 kg)	1	Crystal Bridges Museum of American Art and Art Bridges Foundation, Bentonville, Arkansas (jointly owned)	123	GF1991-016	Candy piece
"Untitled"	1991	Wooden box, paper, photographs, magazines, postcards, and other objects	2 1/2 x 10 1/4 x 12 1/2 in (6.35 x 26.03 x 31.75 cm)	1		124	GF1991-018	The artist deemed that the work should only be displayed privately by the collector who purchased it, meaning it is represented in exhibitions with wall text but remains physically at the collector's private home; objects were added to the work by the artist over time following its sale, including one AP each of "Untitled" (1991) [GF1991-081] and "Untitled" (Key West) (1992), which are not themselves autonomous works of art and must remain with this work.
"Untitled" (We Don't Remember)	1991	Print on paper, endless copies	8 in (20.32 cm) at ideal height x 29 x 23 in (73.66 x 58.42 cm) [original paper size]	1	Staatliche Kunstsammlungen Dresden, Germany	125	GF1991-019	Replenishable stack; text on paper: "WIR ERINNERN UNS NICHT"
"Untitled" (Placebo)	1991	Candies in silver wrappers, endless supply	Overall dimensions variable; ideal weight: 1,000–1,200 lb (453–544 kg)	1	Museum of Modern Art, New York	126	GF1991-020	Candy piece
"Untitled" (Implosion)	1991	Silkscreen on Coventry rag paper	40 x 30 in (101.6 x 76.2 cm)	190, 10 APs	Whitney Museum, New York	127	GF1991-021	Entire edition remains together as one work, stacked at 8 in height; published by Edition Julie Sylvester, New York
"Untitled" (Go-Go Dancing Platform)	1991	Wood, light bulbs, light sockets, electrical cord, and acrylic paint	21 1/2 x 72 x 72 in (54.61 x 182.88 x 182.88 cm)	1		128	GF1991-022	
"Untitled" (Chemo)	1991	Strands of beads and hanging device	Dimensions variable	1	Glenstone, Potomac, Maryland	129	GF1991-023	Beaded curtain; consists of white, clear, and silver plastic beads
"Untitled" (Welcome)	1991	Rubber mats, photographs, metal, soap, paper, cloth	Overall dimensions variable; original dimensions: 11 x 29 1/2 x 71 in (27.94 x 74.93 x 180.34 cm)	1		130	GF1991-024	
"Untitled" (7 Days of Bloodworks)	1991	Acrylic, gesso, and graphite on canvas	20 x 121 in (50.8 x 307.34 cm) overall; seven parts, 20 x 16 in (50.8 x 40.64 cm) each	1		131	GF1991-025	
"Untitled" (Rossmore II)	1991	Green candies in clear wrappers, endless supply	Overall dimensions variable; ideal weight: 75 lb (34 kg)	1		132	GF1991-026	Candy piece
"Untitled"	1991	Print on paper, endless copies	3 1/4 in (8.25 cm) at ideal height x 11 x 8 1/2 in (27.94 x 21.59 cm) [original paper size]	1, 1 AP		133	GF1991-027	Replenishable stack
"Untitled" (31 Days of Bloodworks)	1991	Acrylic, gesso, graphite, photographs, and paper on canvas	Overall dimensions variable; thirty-one parts, 20 x 16 in (50.8 x 40.64 cm) each	1		138	GF1991-028	
"Untitled" (A Couple)	1991	C-print jigsaw puzzle mounted on museum board	11 x 22 in (27.94 x 55.88 cm) overall; two parts, 11 in (27.94 cm) diameter each	1, 1 AP		134	GF1991-029	Initially titled "Untitled" (A Portrait)
"Untitled" (Ross)	1991	Candies in variously colored wrappers, endless supply	Overall dimensions variable; ideal weight: 175 lb (79.3 kg)	1		137	GF1991-030	Candy piece
"Untitled" (A Portrait)	1991/1995	Video, monitor, pedestal, and chairs	Overall dimensions variable; video: 5 min	1	Staatliche Kunstsammlungen Dresden, Germany	135	GF1991-031	
"Untitled" (Orpheus, Twice)	1991	Mirror	Overall dimensions variable; two parts, 76 3/4 x 27 1/2 in (194.94 x 69.85 cm) each	1		139	GF1991-032	Work is ideally exhibited embedded in the wall
"Untitled" (Portrait of Julie Ault)	1991	Paint on wall	Dimensions variable	1		136	GF1991-033	Date portrait
"Untitled" (Throat)	1991	Handkerchief and cough-drops endless supply	Overall dimensions variable; 1 1/2 in (3.81 cm) at ideal height x 16 x 16 in (40.64 x 40.64 cm)	1	Astrup Fearnley Museum of Modern Art, Oslo	140	GF1991-035	Candy piece; originally consisted of Luden's Honey and Menthol cough drops and handkerchief
"Untitled" (Lover's Letter)	1991	C-print jigsaw puzzle in plastic bag	7 1/2 x 9 1/2 in (19.05 x 24.13 cm)	3, 1 AP		141	GF1991-036	
"Untitled" (Lover's Letter)	1991	C-print jigsaw puzzle in plastic bag	7 1/2 x 9 1/2 in (19.05 x 24.13 cm)	3, 1 AP		142	GF1991-037	
"Untitled" (Album)	1991	C-print jigsaw puzzle in plastic bag	7 1/2 x 9 1/2 in (19.05 x 24.13 cm)	3, 1 AP		143	GF1991-038	
"Untitled" (Vancouver)	1991	C-print jigsaw puzzle in plastic bag	7 1/2 x 9 1/2 in (19.05 x 24.13 cm)	3, 1 AP		144	GF1991-039	
"Untitled" (Lover's Letter)	1991	C-print jigsaw puzzle in plastic bag	7 1/2 x 9 1/2 in (19.05 x 24.13 cm)	3, 1 AP		145	GF1991-040	
"Untitled" (1987)	1991	C-print jigsaw puzzle in plastic bag	7 1/2 x 9 1/2 in (19.05 x 24.13 cm)	3, 1 AP		146	GF1991-041	
"Untitled" (Cold Blue Snow)	1991	C-print jigsaw puzzle in plastic bag	9 1/2 x 7 1/2 in (24.13 x 19.05 cm)	3, 1 AP		147	GF1991-042	
"Untitled" (Lover's Letter)	1991	C-print jigsaw puzzle in plastic bag	7 1/2 x 9 1/2 in (19.05 x 24.13 cm)	3, 1 AP		148	GF1991-043	
"Untitled" (Paris)	1991	C-print jigsaw puzzle in plastic bag	7 1/2 x 9 1/2 in (19.05 x 24.13 cm)	3, 1 AP		149	GF1991-044	
"Untitled" (Vida)	1991	C-print jigsaw puzzle in plastic bag	7 1/2 x 9 1/2 in (19.05 x 24.13 cm)	3, 1 AP		153	GF1991-045	
"Untitled" (Last Letter)	1991	Chromogenic print jigsaw puzzle in plastic bag	7 1/2 x 9 1/2 in (19.05 x 24.13 cm)	3, 1 AP	Museum of Modern Art, New York	150	GF1991-046	
"Untitled" (My Soul of Life)	1991	C-print jigsaw puzzle in plastic bag	7 1/2 x 9 1/2 in (19.05 x 24.13 cm)	3, 1 AP		151	GF1991-048	
"Untitled" (Dream)	1991	C-print jigsaw puzzle in plastic bag	7 1/2 x 9 1/2 in (19.05 x 24.13 cm)	3, 1 AP	National Museum of Modern Art, Kyoto	154	GF1991-049	
"Untitled" (Last Letters)	1991	C-print jigsaw puzzle in plastic bag	7 1/2 x 9 1/2 in (19.05 x 24.13 cm)	3, 1 AP	Colección Jumex, Mexico City	155	GF1991-050	
"Untitled" (Wawannaisa)	1991	C-print jigsaw puzzle in plastic bag	7 1/2 x 9 1/2 in (19.05 x 24.13 cm)	3, 1 AP		152	GF1991-051	
"Untitled" (Ross Scuba Diving)	1991	C-print jigsaw puzzle in plastic bag	7 1/2 x 9 1/2 in (19.05 x 24.13 cm)	3, 1 AP	Colección Jumex, Mexico City	156	GF1991-052	
"Untitled" (Ross and Harry)	1991	C-print jigsaw puzzle in plastic bag	7 1/2 x 9 1/2 in (19.05 x 24.13 cm)	3, 1 AP		157	GF1991-053	
"Untitled" (7 Days of Bloodworks)	1991	Acrylic, gesso, and graphite on canvas	Overall dimensions variable; seven parts, 20 x 16 in (50.8 x 40.64 cm) each	1	Pinault Collection, Paris	159	GF1991-054	
"Untitled" (Double Portrait)	1991	Print on paper, endless copies	26 cm (10 1/4 in) at ideal height x 100 x 70 cm (39 3/8 x 27 1/2 in) [original paper size]	1	Buffalo AKG Art Museum, Buffalo, New York, and Tate, London (jointly owned)	158	GF1991-055	Replenishable stack; ideal size formatted by the artist as a metric measurement
"Untitled" (Passport)	1991	Paper, endless supply	10 cm (4 in) at ideal height x 60 x 60 cm (23 5/8 x 23 5/8 in) [original paper size]	1	Hessel Museum of Art, Annandale-on-Hudson, New York	160	GF1991-056	Replenishable stack; ideal size formatted by the artist as a metric measurement
"Untitled" (Blue Placebo)	1991	Candies in blue wrappers, endless supply	Overall dimensions variable; ideal weight: 130 kg (286 lb)	1	Astrup Fearnley Museum of Modern Art, Oslo	161	GF1991-057	Candy piece; ideal weight formatted by the artist as a metric measurement
"Untitled" (Line of Long Life)	1991	Embossed paper, endless copies	12.5 cm (4 7/8 in) at ideal height x 60 x 60 cm (23 5/8 x 23 5/8 in) [original paper size]	1		166	GF1991-058	Replenishable stack; ideal size formatted by the artist as a metric measurement
"Untitled" (Portrait of the Stillpasses)	1991	Paint on wall	Dimensions variable	1		162	GF1991-059	Date portrait
"Untitled" (Supreme Majority)	1991	White paper	Overall dimensions variable; seven parts, each varying in size; original installation: 61 x 86 x 36 in (154.94 x 218.44 x 91.44 cm) overall	1	Museum of Modern Art, New York	164	GF1991-061	
"Untitled" (Party Platform - 1980–1992)	1991	Black paper, endless supply	7 in (17.78 cm) at ideal height x 40 x 26 in (101.6 x 66.04 cm) [original paper size]	1		163	GF1991-062	Replenishable stack; previously exhibited and published as "Untitled" (NRC)
"Untitled" (Public Opinion)	1991	Black rod licorice candies in clear wrappers, endless supply	Overall dimensions variable; ideal weight: 700 lb (317 kg)	1	Solomon R. Guggenheim Museum, New York	167	GF1991-063	Candy piece
"Untitled" (Portrait of Ross in L.A.)	1991	Candies in variously colored wrappers, endless supply	Overall dimensions variable; ideal weight: 175 lb (79.3 kg)	1	Art Institute of Chicago	168	GF1991-064	Candy piece
"Untitled" (NRA)	1991	Print on paper, endless copies	8 in (20.32 cm) at ideal height x 58 x 42 in (147.32 x 106.68 cm) [original paper size]	1	Astrup Fearnley Museum of Modern Art, Oslo	169	GF1991-065	Replenishable stack
"Untitled"	1991	Print on paper, endless copies	8 1/2 in (21.59 cm) at ideal height x 58 x 42 in (147.32 x 106.68 cm) [original paper size]	1		165	GF1991-067	Replenishable stack
"Untitled" (Bloomie's)	1991	C-print jigsaw puzzle in plastic bag	7 1/2 x 9 1/2 in (19.05 x 24.13 cm)	3, 1 AP		170	GF1991-068	
"Untitled"	1991	C-print jigsaw puzzle in plastic bag	9 1/2 x 7 1/2 in (24.13 x 19.05 cm)	3, 1 AP		171	GF1991-069	
"Untitled" (1980-1992)	1991	C-print jigsaw puzzle in plastic bag	10 1/2 x 13 1/2 in (26.67 x 34.29 cm)	3, 1 AP		172	GF1991-070	
"Untitled" (Chief Justice's Hands)	1991	Chromogenic print jigsaw puzzle in plastic bag	10 1/2 x 13 1/2 in (26.67 x 34.29 cm)	3, 1 AP	Buffalo AKG Art Museum, Buffalo, New York	173	GF1991-071	
"Untitled" (Fainted)	1991	C-print jigsaw puzzle in plastic bag	10 1/2 x 13 1/2 in (26.67 x 34.29 cm)	3, 1 AP	Art Institute of Chicago	174	GF1991-072	
"Untitled" (David Souter's Home)	1991	C-print jigsaw puzzle in plastic bag	10 1/2 x 13 1/2 in (26.67 x 34.29 cm)	3, 1 AP		175	GF1991-073	
"Untitled" (David Souter's Home)	1991	C-print jigsaw puzzle in plastic bag	10 1/2 x 13 1/2 in (26.67 x 34.29 cm)	3, 1 AP		176	GF1991-074	
"Untitled" (I Love NY)	1991	C-print jigsaw puzzle in plastic bag	10 1/2 x 13 1/2 in (26.67 x 34.29 cm)	3, 1 AP		177	GF1991-075	
"Untitled" (Para Un Hombre En Uniforme)	1991	Red-white-and-blue lollipops, endless supply	Overall dimensions variable; ideal weight 100 kg (220.5 lb)	1	Hessel Museum of Art, Annandale-on-Hudson, New York	178	GF1991-076	Candy piece; ideal weight formatted by the artist as a metric measurement; previously exhibited and published as "Untitled" (Hard Times Ahead)
"Untitled"	1991	Print on paper, endless copies	7 in (17.78 cm) at ideal height x 45 1/4 x 38 1/2 in (114.93 x 97.79 cm) [original paper size]	1	Walker Art Center, Minneapolis	180	GF1991-077	Replenishable stack
"Untitled" (Legal Size White)	1991	Metal magazine rack and paper, endless supply	65 1/2 x 9 3/4 x 4 1/8 in (166.37 x 24.76 x 10.48 cm) overall; paper size: 14 x 8 1/2 in (35.56 x 21.59 cm)	1		181	GF1991-078	Replenishable stack
"Untitled" (Portrait of Dad)	1991	White mint candies in clear wrappers, endless supply	Overall dimensions variable; ideal weight 175 lb (79.3 kg)	1		179	GF1991-079	Candy piece
"Untitled"	1991	C-print jigsaw puzzle in plastic bag	7 1/2 x 9 1/2 in (19.05 x 24.13 cm)	3, 1 AP	Museum Boijmans Van Beuningen, Rotterdam, Netherlands (permanent loan)	182	GF1991-081	AP is a component of "Untitled" (1991) [GF1991-018]
"Untitled" (Aparación)	1991	Print on paper, endless copies	8 in (20.32 cm) at ideal height x 43 x 28 1/2 in (109.22 x 72.39 cm) [original paper size]	1		183	GF1991-083	Replenishable stack
"Untitled"	1991	Billboard	Dimensions variable	1	Museum of Modern Art, New York	184	GF1991-084	
"Untitled" (Fear)	1991	Blue mirror	30 5/8 x 25 7/8 in (77.79 x 65.72 cm)	1		185	GF1991-085	Work is ideally exhibited embedded in the wall
"Untitled"	1992	Light bulbs, porcelain light sockets, and electrical cord	Overall dimensions variable; 24 ft (7.3 m) length, 20 ft (6.1 m) extra cord	2		186	GF1992-006	Consists of 24 light bulbs
"Untitled" (Tim Hotel)	1992	Light bulbs, porcelain light sockets, and electrical cord	Overall dimensions variable; 42 ft (12.8 m) length, 20 ft (6.1 m) extra cord	1		188	GF1992-007	Consists of 42 light bulbs
"Untitled" (Fear)	1992	Blue mirror	8 1/4 x 30 1/2 x 30 1/2 in (20.95 x 77.47 x 77.47 cm)	1		187	GF1992-008	
"Untitled" (Portrait of Marcel Brient)	1992	Candies in blue wrappers, endless supply	Overall dimensions variable; ideal weight 90 kg (198.5 lb)	1	Pola Museum of Art, Hakone	189	GF1992-009	Candy piece; ideal weight formatted by the artist as a metric measurement
"Untitled" (Portrait of Jennifer Flay)	1992	Paint on wall	Dimensions variable	1		191	GF1992-010	Date portrait
"Untitled" (It's Just a Matter of Time)	1992	Billboard	Dimensions variable	1		190	GF1992-011	
"Untitled" (Petit Palais)	1992	Light bulbs, porcelain light sockets, and electrical cord	Overall dimensions variable; 42 ft (12.8 m) length, 20 ft (6.1 m) extra cord	1	Philadelphia Museum of Art	192	GF1992-012	Consists of 42 light bulbs
"Untitled" (Key West)	1992	C-print jigsaw puzzle in plastic bag	7 1/2 x 9 1/2 in (19.05 x 24.13 cm)	3, 1 AP with 1 AAP		193	GF1992-013	AAP is a component of "Untitled" (1991) [GF1991-018]
"Untitled"	1992	Billboard	Dimensions variable	1		194	GF1992-014	
"Untitled" (Miami)	1992	Light bulbs, porcelain light sockets, and electrical cord	Overall dimensions variable; 42 ft (12.8 m) length, 20 ft (6.1 m) extra cord	1		197	GF1992-015	Consists of 42 light bulbs
"Untitled" (Toronto)	1992	Light bulbs, porcelain light sockets, and electrical cord	Overall dimensions variable; 42 ft (12.8 m) length, 20 ft (6.1 m) extra cord	1	Museum of Modern Art, New York	196	GF1992-016	Consists of 42 light bulbs
"Untitled" (Portrait of Andrea Rosen)	1992	Paint on wall	Dimensions variable	1		195	GF1992-017	Date portrait
"Untitled"	1992	Billboard	Dimensions variable	1	Hessel Museum of Art, Annandale-on-Hudson, New York	201	GF1992-018	
"Untitled" (rue St. Denis)	1992	Light bulbs, porcelain light sockets, and electrical cord	Overall dimensions variable; 42 ft (12.8 m) length, 20 ft (6.1 m) extra cord	1		199	GF1992-019	Consists of 42 light bulbs
"Untitled" (Rossmore)	1992	Light bulbs, porcelain light sockets, and electrical cord	Overall dimensions variable; 42 ft (12.8 m) length, 20 ft (6.1 m) extra cord	1		200	GF1992-020	Consists of 42 light bulbs
"Untitled" (For Jeff)	1992	Billboard	Dimensions variable	1	Hirshhorn Museum and Sculpture Garden, Smithsonian Institution, Washington, D.C.	198	GF1992-021	
"Untitled" (1992)	1992	Framed photostat	12 5/8 x 16 5/8 in (32.07 x 42.23 cm)	4, 1 AP		202	GF1992-022	
"Untitled" (Alice B. Toklas' and Gertrude Stein's Grave, Paris)	1992	Framed C-print	29 1/4 x 36 1/4 in (74.29 x 92.07 cm)	4, 1 AP	Hessel Museum of Art, Annandale-on-Hudson, New York; and Pinault Collection, Paris	203	GF1992-023	
"Untitled"	1992	Candies in variously colored wrappers, endless supply	Overall dimensions variable; original size: 2 x 48 x 48 in (5.08 x 121.92 x 121.92 cm)	1		204	GF1992-024	Candy piece
"Untitled" (For Stockholm)	1992	Light bulbs, porcelain light sockets, and electrical cords	Overall dimensions variable; twelve parts, 42 ft (12.8 m) length each, 20 ft (6.1 m) extra cord each	1	Pinault Collection, Paris	GF1992-025	Consists of 12 strings with 42 light bulbs each	
"Untitled" (America #1)	1992	Light bulbs, porcelain light sockets, and electrical cord	Overall dimensions variable; 42 ft (12.8 m) length, 20 ft (6.1 m) extra cord	1	San Francisco Museum of Modern Art	208	GF1992-026	Consists of 42 light bulbs
"Untitled" (National Front)	1992	Print on paper, endless copies	14 cm (5 1/2 in) at ideal height x 125 x 91 cm (49 1/8 x 35 3/4 in) [original paper size]	1		205	GF1992-027	Replenishable stack; ideal size formatted by the artist as a metric measurement
"Untitled"	1992	Framed gelatin silver print with pencil	21 1/4 x 18 5/8 in (53.97 x 47.31 cm)	3, 1 AP	Hessel Museum of Art, Annandale-on-Hudson, New York	206	GF1992-028	
"Untitled" (Love Letter)	1992	Framed C-print	19 1/2 x 23 1/2 in (49.53 x 59.69 cm)	1	Hessel Museum of Art, Annandale-on-Hudson, New York	212	GF1992-029	
"Untitled" (Republican Years)	1992	Print on paper, endless copies	20 cm (7 7/8 in) at ideal height x 138 x 98 cm (54 1/3 x 38 5/9 in) [original paper size]	1	Sprengel Museum, Hanover, Germany	211	GF1992-030	Replenishable stack; ideal size formatted by the artist as a metric measurement
"Untitled" (Florence)	1985-1992	Framed C-print	24 3/4 x 31 1/4 in (62.86 x 79.37 cm)	1		214	GF1992-031	
"Untitled" (Love Letter)	1992	Framed C-print	19 1/2 x 23 1/2 in (49.53 x 59.69 cm)	1		213	GF1992-035	
"Untitled" (Double Bloodworks)	1992	Acrylic and graphite on canvas	14 x 26 in (35.56 x 66.04 cm) overall; two parts, 14 x 12 in (35.56 x 30.48 cm) each	1		215	GF1992-036	
"Untitled" (America #2)	1992	Light bulbs, porcelain light sockets, and electrical cord	Overall dimensions variable; 42 ft (12.8 m) length, 20 ft (6.1 m) extra cord	1		209	GF1992-037	Consists of 42 light bulbs
"Untitled" (America #3)	1992	Light bulbs, porcelain light sockets, and electrical cord	Overall dimensions variable; 42 ft (12.8 m) length, 20 ft (6.1 m) extra cord	1	Pola Museum of Art, Hakone	210	GF1992-038	Consists of 42 light bulbs
"Untitled"	1992	Tattoo	Size varies with individual	Unlimited		216	GF1992-039	
"Untitled" (Blood)	1992	Strands of beads and hanging device	Dimensions variable	1	Pinault Collection, Paris	217	GF1992-040	Beaded curtain; Consists of red and clear plastic beads
"Untitled" (Album)	1992	Handmade leather-bound photo album with black pages and mounting corners	14 x 14 x 2 1/2 in (35.56 x 35.56 x 6.35 cm), 24 leaves	12, 4 APs, 1 AP with 35 leaves	Metropolitan Museum of Art, New York; Museum of Modern Art, New York (2 versions); and Whitney Museum, New York	218	GF1992-041	Work is not considered complete until owners add their own personal photographs and mementos; published by Edition Julie Sylvester, New York
"Untitled" (For New York)	1992	Light bulbs, porcelain light sockets, and electrical cord	Overall dimensions variable; 42 ft (12.8 m) length, 20 ft (6.1 m) extra cord	1	Beyeler Foundation, Riehen, Switzerland	221	GF1992-042	Consists of 42 light bulbs
"Untitled" (A Love Meal)	1992	Light bulbs, porcelain light sockets, and electrical cord	Overall dimensions variable; 42 ft (12.8 m) length, 20 ft (6.1 m) extra cord	1	Stedelijk Museum Amsterdam	222	GF1992-043	Consists of 42 light bulbs
"Untitled" (Silver)	1992	Light bulbs, metal light sockets, and electrical cord	Overall dimensions variable; 42 ft (12.8 m) length, 20 ft (6.1 m) extra cord	1		219	GF1992-044	Consists of 24 light bulbs
"Untitled" (Bloodworks)	1992	Gouache and graphite on paper, framed	Overall dimensions variable; four parts, 12 x 10 1/2 in (30.48 x 26.67 cm) each	1		220	GF1992-045	
"Untitled" (Jorge)	1992	Framed C-print	41 3/8 x 50 5/8 in (105.09 x 128.59 cm)	1		224	GF1992-046	
"Untitled" (Paris)	1992	Framed C-print	18 7/8 x 22 5/8 in (47.94 x 57.47 cm)	1, 1 AP		223	GF1992-047	
"Untitled" (False Hope - Bloodwork)	1992	Acrylic, wax, and graphite on linen	16 x 12 in (40.64 x 30.48 cm)	1		225	GF1992-048	
"Untitled" (A Walk in the Snow)	1993	Framed C-print	25 x 28 1/2 in (63.5 x 72.39 cm)	1		226	GF1993-001	
"Untitled" (A Walk in the Snow)	1993	Framed C-print	25 x 32 in (63.5 x 81.28 cm)	1	Hessel Museum of Art, Annandale-on-Hudson, New York	227	GF1993-002	
"Untitled"	1992/1993	Print on paper, endless copies	8 in (20.32 cm) at ideal height x 48 1/4 x 33 1/4 in (122.55 x 84.45 cm) [original paper size]	1		229	GF1993-003	Replenishable stack
"Untitled"	1992/1993	Print on paper, endless copies	8 in (20.32 cm) at ideal height x 44 1/2 x 33 1/2 in (122.55 x 84.45 cm) [original paper size]	1	San Francisco Museum of Modern Art	228	GF1993-004	Replenishable stack
"Untitled"	1993	Print on paper, endless copies	8 in (20.32 cm) at ideal height x 37 x 55 1/2 in (93.98 x 140.97 cm) [original paper size]	1	Abteiberg Museum, Mönchengladbach, Germany	231	GF1993-005	Replenishable stack; created in collaboration with Christopher Wool
"Untitled" (North)	1993	Light bulbs, porcelain light sockets, and electrical cords	Overall dimensions variable; twelve parts, 22 1/2 ft (6.8 m) length each, 20 ft (6.1 m) extra cord each	1	Hessel Museum of Art, Annandale-on-Hudson, New York	232	GF1993-006	Consists of 12 strings with 22 light bulbs each
"Untitled" (Couple)	1993	Light bulbs, porcelain light sockets, and electrical cords	Overall dimensions variable; two parts, 42 ft (12.8 m) length each, 20 ft (6.1 m) extra cord each	1		237	GF1993-007	Consists of 2 strings with 24 light bulbs each
"Untitled" (Bloodwork - Steady Decline)	1993	Graphite and gouache on paper	Overall dimensions variable; thirteen parts, 14 x 11 in (35.56 x 27.94 cm) each	1	Art Institute of Chicago	233	GF1993-009	
"Untitled"	1991-1993	Billboard	Overall dimensions variable; two parts	1	Staatliche Kunstsammlungen Dresden, Germany	230	GF1993-010	
"Untitled" (Portrait of Elaine Dannheisser)	1993	Paint on wall	Dimensions variable	1	Museum of Modern Art, New York	234	GF1993-011	Date portrait
"Untitled" (Portrait of Ingvild Goetz)	1993	Paint on wall	Dimensions variable	1		235	GF1993-012	Date portrait
"Untitled" (Portrait of the Magoons)	1993	Paint on wall	Dimensions variable	1	Metropolitan Museum of Art, New York	236	GF1993-013	Date portrait
"Untitled" (Strange Bird)	1993	Billboard	Dimensions variable	1	Art Gallery of Ontario, Toronto	242	GF1993-014	
"Untitled" (Placebo - Landscape - for Roni)	1993	Candies in gold wrappers, endless supply	Overall dimensions variable; ideal weight 1,200 lb (544 kg)	1	Staatliche Kunstsammlungen Dresden, Germany	251	GF1993-015	Candy piece
"Untitled" (Lovers - Paris)	1993	Light bulbs, porcelain light sockets, and electrical cords	Overall dimensions variable; two parts, 41 ft (12.5 m) length each, 20 ft (6.1 m) extra cord each	1	Glenstone, Potomac, Maryland	239	GF1993-016	Consists of 2 strings with 42 lights each
"Untitled" (Passport #II)	1993	Print on paper, endless copies	20.3 cm (8 in) at ideal height x 76.2 x 61 cm (31 1/2 x 29 1/2 in) [original size]; bound booklets: 12 pages, 15.2 x 10.2 cm (6 x 4 in) each [original size]	1		238	GF1993-017	Replenishable stack; ideal size formatted by the artist as a metric measurement
"Untitled" (Arena)	1993	Light bulbs, porcelain light sockets, dimmer switch, and electrical cord	Overall dimensions variable; 59 ft (18 m) length, 20 ft (6.1 m) extra cord	1	Metropolitan Museum of Art, New York	240	GF1993-018	Consists of 60 light bulbs
"Untitled" (9 Days of Bloodwork - Steady Decline and False Hope)	1993	Gouache and graphite on paper, framed	Overall dimensions variable; nine parts, 17 3/4 x 13 3/4 in (45.08 x 34.92 cm) each	1		243	GF1993-019	
"Untitled" (7 Days of Bloodwork - Steady Decline)	1993	Gouache and graphite on paper	Overall dimensions variable; seven parts, 14 x 11 in (35.56 x 27.94 cm) each	1		244	GF1993-020	
"Untitled" (Portrait of Robert Vifian)	1993	Paint on wall	Dimensions variable	1		241	GF1993-021	Date portrait
"Untitled" (Portrait of Austrian Airlines)	1993	Medium variable	Dimensions variable	1		250	GF1993-022	Billboard/date portrait; work consists of a list of the cities served by Austrian Airlines along with the year the airline began flying there, printed in white text on a green background, installed as a variably sized billboard or round advertising column.
"Untitled" (Strange Music)	1993	Light bulbs, porcelain light sockets, and electrical cord	Overall dimensions variable; 43 ft (13.1 m) length, 20 ft (6.1 m) extra cord	1		245	GF1993-024	Consists of 42 light bulbs
"Untitled" (Last Light)	1993	Light bulbs, plastic light sockets, electrical cord, and dimmer switch	Overall dimensions variable; 11 1/2 ft (3.5 m) length, 12 1/2 ft (3.8 m) extra cord	24, 6 APs	Art Institute of Chicago; Harvard Art Museums, Cambridge, Massachusetts; Israel Museum, Jerusalem; Musée National d'Art Moderne, Centre Pompidou, Paris; Museum of Contemporary Art, Los Angeles (2 versions); National Museum of Art, Osaka; and Walker Art Center, Minneapolis	246	GF1993-026	Consists of 24 light bulbs; published by A.R.T. (Art Resources Transfer) Press, Los Angeles, and Andrea Rosen Gallery, New York
"Untitled" (Leaves of Grass)	1993	Light bulbs, porcelain light sockets, and electrical cord	Overall dimensions variable; 41 1/2 ft (12.6 m) length, 20 ft (6.1 m) extra cord	1		247	GF1993-027	Consists of 42 light bulbs
"Untitled" (Summer)	1993	Light bulbs, porcelain light sockets, and electrical cord	Overall dimensions variable; 41 1/2 ft (12.6 m) length, 20 ft (6.1 m) extra cord	1		249	GF1993-028	Consists of 42 light bulbs
"Untitled" (Ischia)	1993	Light bulbs, porcelain light sockets, and electrical cord	Overall dimensions variable; 42 ft (12.8 m) length, 20 ft (6.1 m) extra cord	1	Astrup Fearnley Museum of Modern Art, Oslo	248	GF1993-029	Consists of 42 light bulbs
"Untitled" (Alice B. Toklas and Gertrude Stein)	1992/1993	Framed C-print	19 1/8 x 23 1/8 in (48.58 x 58.74 cm)	1		252	GF1993-030	
"Untitled"	1994	Billboard	Dimensions variable	1		253	GF1994-001	
"Untitled" (Portrait of the Rosenbergs)	1994	Paint on wall	Dimensions variable	1		254	GF1994-002	Date portrait
"Untitled" (For Parkett)	1994	Billboard on Appleton coated stock	Overall dimensions variable; maximum dimensions: 125 x 272 in (317.5 x 690.88 cm)	84, 15 APs	Art Gallery of South Australia, Adelaide; Mary and Leigh Block Museum of Art, Evanston, Illinois; Hessel Museum of Art, Annandale-on-Hudson, New York; Museum of Modern Art, New York; and Sprengel Museum, Hannover	255	GF1994-003	Work is not considered complete until installed and is permanently destroyed when uninstalled; published by Parkett-Verlag, Zürich, for Parkett no. 39
"Untitled" (21 Days of Bloodwork - Steady Decline)	1994	Gouache and graphite on paper	Overall dimensions variable; twenty-one parts, 16 1/2 x 12 3/8 in (41.91 x 31.43 cm) each	1		257	GF1994-004	
"Untitled" (19 Days of Bloodwork - Steady Decline)	1994	Gouache and graphite on paper, framed	Overall dimensions variable; nineteen parts, 16 1/2 x 12 3/8 in (41.91 x 31.43 cm) each	1		256	GF1994-005	
"Untitled" (Portrait of MOCA)	1994	Paint on wall	Dimensions variable	1	Museum of Contemporary Art, Los Angeles	263	GF1994-006	Date portrait
"Untitled" (Bloodwork - Steady Decline)	1994	Graphite and gouache on paper	14 3/4 x 10 7/8 in (37.46 x 27.62 cm)	1		258	GF1994-007	
"Untitled" (Diptych)	1994	Framed gelatin silver prints	25 1/8 x 71 1/2 in (63.82 x 181.61 cm) overall; two parts, 25 1/8 x 32 3/4 in (63.82 x 83.18 cm) each	1, 1 AP		265	GF1994-008	
"Untitled" (Portrait of Cincinnati Art Museum)	1994	Paint on wall	Dimensions variable	1	Cincinnati Art Museum	262	GF1994-009	Date portrait
"Untitled" (Sand)	1993-1994	Portfolio of photogravures on Somerset Satin paper in silk covered archival box	Overall dimensions variable; eight parts, 12 1/2 x 15 1/2 in (31.75 x 39.37 cm) each	12, 6 APs	Colección Jumex, Mexico City; Hessel Museum of Art, Annandale-on-Hudson, New York; Metropolitan Museum of Art, New York; and Whitney Museum, New York	264	GF1994-010	Published by Edition Julie Sylvester, New York
"Untitled"	1994	Framed gelatin silver prints	25 1/4 x 176 3/8 in (64.13 x 447.99 cm) overall; five parts, 25 1/4 x 32 7/8 in (64.13 x 83.5 cm) each	2, 1 AP		266	GF1994-011	Photographs may be installed in any order
"Untitled"	1994	Framed C-prints	Overall dimensions variable; two parts, 26 3/8 x 33 7/8 in (66.99 x 86.04 cm) each	2, 1 AP		268	GF1994-012	Photographs must be installed adjacently, in either order
"Untitled" (Beginning)	1994	Strands of beads and hanging device	Dimensions variable	1		269	GF1994-014	Beaded curtain; consists of green, clear, and silver plastic beads
"Untitled"	1994	Silkscreen on cotton t-shirt	Size XL	500		260	GF1994-015	Published by agnès b., New York
"Untitled"	1994	Framed gelatin silver prints	25 5/8 x 140 1/2 in (65.09 x 356.87 cm) overall; four parts, 25 5/8 x 32 7/8 in (65.09 x 83.5 cm) each	2, 1 AP	Metropolitan Museum of Art, New York	271	GF1994-016	Photographs may be installed in any order
"Untitled" (America)	1994	Light bulbs, waterproof rubber light sockets, and waterproof electrical cords	Overall dimensions variable; twelve parts, 65 1/2 ft (19.9 m) length each, 24 1/2 ft (7.4 m) extra cord each	1	Whitney Museum, New York	270	GF1994-017	Consists of 12 strings, 24 light bulbs each
"Untitled" (Bloodwork - Steady Decline)	1994	Graphite and gouache on paper, framed	16 1/2 x 12 3/8 in (41.9 x 31.4 cm)	1		259	GF1994-019	
"Untitled" (Portrait of the Fabric Workshop, a gift to Kippy)	1994	Paint on wall	Dimensions variable	1		272	GF1994-020	Date portrait
"Untitled"	1994	Framed gelatin silver print	25 3/8 x 32 7/8 in (64.45 x 83.5 cm)	2, 1 AP		267	GF1994-021	
"Untitled"	1994	C-print, framed in Plexiglas box	4 1/16 x 6 1/16 x 1 1/4 in (10.32 x 15.4 x 3.17 cm)	25, 12 APs, 5 PPs	Whitney Museum, New York	261	GF1994-022	Published by Printed Matter, Inc., New York, for the portfolio Portraits (1994)
"Untitled"	1995	Billboard	Dimensions variable	1	Art Institute of Chicago	275	GF1995-001	
"Untitled" (Oscar Wilde)	1995	Photo-etching on paper	4 1/2 x 6 in (11.43 x 15.24 cm)	250, 25 APs, 2 PPs with 2 AAPs	Allen Memorial Art Museum, Oberlin, Ohio; and El Museo del Barrio, New York	273	GF1995-002	Included in special limited edition of exhibition catalogue Felix Gonzalez-Torres (1995), published by the Solomon R. Guggenheim Museum, New York
"Untitled" (Golden)	1995	Strands of beads and hanging device	Dimensions variable	1	Art Institute of Chicago, San Francisco Museum of Modern Art, and Solomon R. Guggenheim Museum, New York (jointly owned)	276	GF1995-003	Beaded curtain; consists of golden, clear, and silver plastic beads
"Untitled" (Vultures)	1995	Framed gelatin silver prints, paint on wall (optional)	Overall dimensions variable; fourteen parts, 25 5/8 x 32 7/8 in (65.09 x 83.5 cm) each	1, 1 AP		274	GF1995-004	
"Untitled" (Water)	1995	Strands of beads and hanging device	Dimensions variable	1	Baltimore Museum of Art	277	GF1995-005	Beaded curtain; consists of blue, clear, and silver plastic beads
"Untitled"	1995	Billboard	Dimensions variable	1		278	GF1995-006	
"Untitled"	1995	Billboard	Dimensions variable	1		279	GF1995-007	
"Untitled"	1995	Silver plated brass	16 1/2 x 33 in (41.91 x 83.82 cm) overall; two parts, 16 1/2 in (41.91 cm) diameter each	12, 4 APs plus 1 PP	Berkeley Art Museum and Pacific Film Archive, California; and Des Moines Art Center, Iowa	280	GF1995-008	Published by Patrick Painter Editions, Vancouver
"Untitled"	1995	Billboard	Dimensions variable	1		281	GF1995-009	
"Untitled"	1994-1995	Billboards, mixed media	Dimensions variable	1		Not listed	GF1995-010	Conceptualized during the artist's lifetime for an unrealized exhibition at CAPC Bordeaux; realized posthumously in conjunction with Felix Gonzalez-Torres (2023), David Zwirner Gallery, New York; work consists of two indoor billboards on wooden structures and includes sound installation of a recording of applause following a 1990 performance by Kathleen Battle and Jessye Norman at Carnegie Hall, New York
"Untitled" (Sagitario)	1994-1995	Medium variable, water	24 x 12 ft (7.3 x 3.6 m) overall; two parts, 12 ft (3.6 m) diameter each	1		Not listed	GF1995-011	Conceptualized during the artist's lifetime for an unrealized exhibition at CAPC Bordeaux; first realized posthumously as two circular pools of water embedded in the ground outdoors, in conjunction with No es sólo lo que ves: Pervirtiendo el minimalismo (2000-2001), from the exhibition series Versiones del Sur: Cinco propuestas en torno al arte en América, Museo Nacional Centro de Arte Reina Sofía, Madrid; realized posthumously for a second time, as two pools of water embedded in the floor indoors, in conjunction with Felix Gonzalez-Torres (2023), David Zwirner Gallery, New York.
"Untitled"	1992-1995	Medium variable, water	14–16 in (35.56–40.64 cm) at ideal height x 24 x 12 ft (7.3 x 3.6 m) or 48 x 24 ft (14.6 x 7.3 m)	1	Glenstone, Potomac, Maryland	Not listed	GF1995-012	Conceptualized during the artist's lifetime for an outdoor sculpture competition at Western Washington University; realized posthumously as two circular pools of water carved from marble, in conjunction with the artist's solo exhibition at the 52nd Venice Biennale (2007)

== List of non-works ==
These non-works were created and exhibited by the artist during his lifetime but disavowed - and in most cases destroyed - before his death. Most of González-Torres' output prior to 1988 was deemed a non-work by the artist and formally disavowed; most of these works are no longer extant. Many of these non-works are similar to formal works; these are noted where known. Non-works included in the 1997 catalogue raisonné were given catalogue numbers in sequential roman numerals; the corresponding catalogue numbers from the Felix Gonzalez-Torres Foundation are the same, with the addition of "N-W" for non-work. Non-works that were not included in the 1997 CR do not have catalogue numbers.

Title	Year	Medium	Dimensions	Edition size	Public collection(s)	1997 CR no.	Foundation cat. no.	Notes
Sociedad or Derretimiento de la Sociedad [Recorded title]	c.1978	Performance, mixed media	N/A	N/A		Not listed	Listed without cat. no.	Created and performed in collaboration with artists Rosa Balsera and José Pérez Mesa for Sociedad / Derretimiento de la Sociedad (1978), University of Puerto Rico, Río Piedras Campus, San Juan; 25 papier-mâché masks were placed on twenty blocks of ice in a line on the university campus
Wrapped [Recorded title]	c.1978	Performance, mixed media	N/A	N/A		Not listed	Listed without cat. no.	Created and performed in collaboration with artists Rosa Balsera and José Pérez Mesa for Wrapped (1978), University of Puerto Rico, Río Piedras Campus, San Juan; a dead tree in the university's Plaza Antonia Martínez was wrapped in 40 yards of fabric
20 años, 10 horas, 10 madres [Formerly titled]	c.1979	Black and white, single-channel video	7 min	Unknown		Not listed	Listed without cat. no.	
Autorretrato 3 [Formerly titled]	c.1979	Black and white, single-channel video	9 min	Unknown		Not listed	Listed without cat. no.	
Cívicas 5 P.M. [Formerly titled]	c.1979	Mixed media, table, ribbons, ornaments	Unknown	Unknown		Not listed	Listed without cat. no.	
Delante/Detras [Formerly titled]	c.1979	Black and white, single-channel video	4 min	Unknown		Not listed	Listed without cat. no.	
Jeff-November [Formerly titled]	c.1979	Black and white, single-channel video	Unknown	Unknown		Not listed	Listed without cat. no.	
New York, New York! [Formerly titled]	c.1979	Black and white, single-channel video	2 min	Unknown		Not listed	Listed without cat. no.	
TV Vacío-Vacío [Formerly titled]	c.1979	Performance, mixed media	N/A	N/A		Not listed	Listed without cat. no.	Performed in conjunction with TV Vacío-Vacío (1979), University of Puerto Rico, Río Piedras Campus, San Juan; artist read aloud a text on everyday topics related to television while two people sat in front of a TV monitor with no signal
Contaminación ambien/mental [Formerly titled]	c.1980	Printed art page in newspaper	14 x 11 1/4 in	Unknown		Not listed	Listed without cat. no.	Published in El Nuevo Día, August 24, 1980
Division #2 [Formerly titled]	c.1980	Color video	5 min	Unknown		Not listed	Listed without cat. no.	
He dicho [Formerly titled]	c.1980	Audio recording	5 min	Unknown		Not listed	Listed without cat. no.	Broadcast on radio station WRTU, University of Puerto Rico, Río Piedras Campus, San Juan
APRENDIENDO [Formerly titled]	c.1981	Black and white, single-channel video	7 min	Unknown		Not listed	Listed without cat. no.	
CESAR [Formerly titled]	c.1981	Color video	18 min	Unknown		Not listed	Listed without cat. no.	
HOGAR [Formerly titled]	c.1981	Color and black and white video	4 min	Unknown		Not listed	Listed without cat. no.	
Olimpia [Formerly titled]	c.1981	Black and white, single-channel video	3:30 min	Unknown		Not listed	Listed without cat. no.	
Unforgettable Winds [Formerly titled]	c.1981	Printed art page in newspaper	14 x 11 1/4 in	Unknown		Not listed	Listed without cat. no.	Published in The San Juan Star, January 11, 1981
La imagen como producto/poder [Formerly titled]	c.1981	Printed art page in newspaper	14 x 11 1/2 in	Unknown		Not listed	Listed without cat. no.	Published in El Nuevo Día, July 26, 1981
Óxido, sueños sobre una cama de hielo [Recorded title]	c.1982	Performance, mixed media, poetry	N/A	N/A		Not listed	Listed without cat. no.	Created and performed in conjunction with poet Aleida Amador for Óxido, sueños sobre una cama de hielo (1982), Residencia Aboy-Lompré, San Juan; artist covered himself in sunscreen wearing swim trunks and laid down on blocks of ice in front of a board with text, while poems by Amador were read aloud
Felix Gonzalez-Torres, 'Rust, dreams on an ice bed', Casa Aboy, San Juan Puerto Rico, January 23, 1982 [Formerly titled]	c.1982	Photo, text in magazine	Unknown	Unknown		Not listed	Listed without cat. no.	Published in High Performance Magazine, Spring-Summer 1982; written text and photo-documentation of performance at Residencia Aboy-Lompré, San Juan
Untitled (Still Life: Newspapers, Dinosaurs, Dolls, Cloths...)	1981/1983	Silver gelatin prints, artist's frame	Four parts, photo A: 4 3/4 x 6 1/2 in, photo B: 6 x 4 1/2 in, photo C: 4 5/8 x 6 3/8 in, photo D: 5 1/2 x 6 1/2 in	Unknown	Puerto Rico Museum of Contemporary Art	Not listed	Not listed	
[No recorded title]	c.1984	Photographic panel on bus	Unknown	Unknown		Not listed	Listed without cat. no.	Executed in conjunction with Metro Bus Show (1984-1985), CEPA Gallery, Buffalo, New York; work was installed on a bus that traveled through the city on multiple routes
[No recorded title]	c.1984	Photos, text, poetry in magazine	Unknown	Unknown		Not listed	Listed without cat. no.	Published in Center for Exploratory Perceptual Art Bulletin, November 1984, in conjunction with Metro Bus Show (1984-1985), CEPA Gallery, Buffalo, New York; includes photos, text, and a poem titled Fetishism
Sin Título [Formerly titled]	c.1985	Color photographs and text	Overall dimensions variable, fifteen parts, 13 x 9 1/2 in	Unknown		Not listed	Listed without cat. no.	
"Will I Lie to You?" [Formerly titled]	1986	Found painting and text	Dimensions variable	1		Not listed	Listed without cat. no.	
"Untitled" (Double Fear)	1986	Acrylic, newsprint on canvas	Diameter 16 in	1		I	N-W I	Similar to formal works "Untitled" (Double Fear) (1987) [GF1987-015, -016, and -017]
"For the Birds" [Formerly titled]	1987	Wood, bird seed, text	80 x 12 x 12 in	1		II	N-W II	
"Untitled" [Formerly titled]	1987	Clock, with rub-on transfer on the clock and on the wall	15 x 15 x 2 1/2 in	3		III	N-W III	
"Untitled"	1987	Iron on stencil on cloth	20 x 20 in	1		IV	N-W IV	
"Untitled"	1987	Photostat, framed	10 x 11 in	1, 1 AP		V	N-W V	
"Untitled"	1987	Wax, acrylic, and graphite on panel	8 x 10 in	1		VI	N-W VI	
"Untitled" (Double Fear)	1987	Acrylic, newsprint on canvas	Diameter 12 in	1		VII	N-W VII	Similar to formal works "Untitled" (Double Fear) (1987) [GF1987-015, -016, and -017]
"Untitled"	1987	C-print, tinted, framed	Frame 8 x 10 in, image 7 5/8 x 9 5/8 in	1		VIII	N-W VIII	
"Untitled"	1987	Cibachrome print	7 x 9 in	1		IX	N-W IX	
"Untitled" [Formerly titled]	1988	Leather belt, engraved brass, brass knuckles	40 x 1 1/2 in	3		X	N-W X	
"Untitled" [Formerly titled]	1989	Quatrenium and plexiglass	48 x 70 in	1		XI	N-W XI	Executed and displayed in Petrosino Square, New York, for a rotating public art exhibition sponsored by the Lower Manhattan Cultural Council; originally referred to by the artist as "Untitled" (Quatrenium)
"White Legal" [Formerly titled]	1989	Metal magazine rack and paper, endless supply	58 x 13 x 11 in	1		XII	N-W XII	Similar to formal works "Untitled" (White Legal) (1989) and "Untitled" (Legal Size White) (1991)
"Rough Draft" [Formerly titled]	1989	Fax-nonexistent offset on paper (endless copies)	8 1/4 x 11 1/2 in	1		XIII	N-W XIII	
"Untitled" (Mirage) [Formerly titled]	1990	Candies in red, silver, and blue wrappers, endless supply	Dimensions variable	1		N/A	Listed without cat. no.	Listed in 1997 CR as a previous title for formal work "Untitled" (USA Today) (1990); listed in Foundation cat. as a separate non-work
"Untitled" (Second Quadrenium 1984-1988)	1990	Acrylic on canvas	Four parts, 20 x 16 in each	1		XIV	N-W XIV	Similar to formal work "Forbidden Colors" (1988)
"Untitled" [Formerly titled]	1990	Blue candies, individually wrapped in cellophane	Overall dimensions variable, ideal weight 158 lb	1		XV	N-W XV	Similar to formal work "Untitled" (Revenge) (1991)
"Untitled" (Loverboys Coma LA)	1990	22 reams of light blue tissue paper	Two parts, 8 x 43 x 43 in overall, 20 x 30 in each	1		XVI	N-W XVI	
"Untitled" (I Spoke to your God) [Formerly titled]	1990	Offset print on red paper, endless copies	10 in at ideal height x 23 x 29 in	1		XVII	N-W XVII	Created in collaboration with Donald Moffett
"Untitled" [Formerly titled]	1990	Billboard	Dimensions variable	1		XVIII	N-W XVIII	Displayed in conjunction with Day Without Art 1990
"Untitled" (We Love George) [Formerly titled]	1990	Text on vinyl	36 x 120 in	1		XIX	N-W XIX	
"Untitled" [Formerly titled]	1990	Offset print on paper, endless copies, paint on wall	Three parts, 18 1/2 x 19 x 81 4/5 in overall	1		XX	N-W XX	Similar to formal work "Untitled" (1990) [GF1990-002]
"Untitled" (Light Blue Wall) [Formerly titled]	1991	Paint on wall	Dimensions variable	1		XXI	N-W XXI	Listed in 1997 CR as "Untitled" (Blue Wall); listed in Foundation cat. twice, under both titles
"Untitled"	1991	C-print jigsaw puzzle in plastic bag	7 1/2 x 9 1/2 in	1		XXII	N-W XXII	
"Untitled" (Supreme Majority) [Formerly titled]	1991	Gesso on triangular canvas	Seven parts, 41 x 96 in overall	1		XXIII	N-W XXIII	Similar to formal work "Untitled" (New Supreme Justice) (1989)
"Untitled" (1980-1992) [Formerly titled]	1991	White paper, endless copies, black cloth, 4 stacks	Four parts, 35 in at ideal height x 25 x 25 in each, cloth 60 x 60 in	1		XXIV	N-W XXIV	Similar to formal work "Untitled" (Blue Cross) (1990)
"Untitled" (Go-Go Dance Platform) [Formerly titled]	1991	Wood, light bulbs, acrylic paint	60 x 16 x 16 in	1		XXV	N-W XXV	Similar to formal work "Untitled" (Go-Go Dancing Platform) (1991)
"Untitled" (Free Tibet)	1991	Handwoven carpet	48 x 78 3/4 in	24		XXVI	N-W XXVI	Published by Equator Productions, New York; executed in conjunction with The Carpet Project (1992), Tanja Grunert Gallery, Cologne, Germany
"Untitled" [Formerly titled]	1992	Wood, light bulbs, enamel paint, porcelain light sockets, extension cord	7 x 82 3/4 x 72 7/8 in	1		XXVII	N-W XXVII	Similar to formal work "Untitled" (Go-Go Dancing Platform) (1991)
"Untitled"	1992	Wood, light bulbs, enamel paint, porcelain light sockets, wire	6 x 72 x 48 in	1		XXVIII	N-W XXVIII	Similar to formal work "Untitled" (Go-Go Dancing Platform) (1991)
"Untitled" [Formerly titled]	1992	Wood, paint, leather and rubber harnesses, g-strings, underwear	12 x 40 x 40 in	1		XXIX	N-W XXIX	
"Untitled" [Formerly titled]	1992	Wood, industrial carpet	8 x 98 x 30 in	1		XXX	N-W XXX	
"Untitled"	1992	Wood, light bulbs, enamel paint, porcelain light sockets, wire	6 x 60 x 60 in	1		XXXI	N-W XXXI	Similar to formal work "Untitled" (Go-Go Dancing Platform) (1991)
"Untitled" (Checks) 1-31	1994	Ink on paper	Overall dimensions variable, thirty one parts, 3 3/4 x 6 3/4 in each	1		XXXII	N-W XXXII	Consisted of checks written out by the artist to benefit ACRIA
"Untitled"	1994	Candies, endless supply	Overall dimensions variable, ideal weight 180 lb	1		XXXIII	N-W XXXIII	Executed in conjunction with Do It (1994), Kunsthalle Ritter Klagenfurt; artist instructed curator to "Get 180 lbs of a local wrapped candy and drop in a corner."

== List of additional materials ==
These materials are not formal works of art by the artist, as he specified prior to his death. Many of these listed materials are similar to, earlier iterations of, or studies for formal works the artist eventually exhibited and sold; these are noted where known. Catalogue numbers for additional materials were formatted as "A#" in the 1997 catalogue raisonné; the corresponding catalogue numbers from the Felix Gonzalez-Torres Foundation are the same, with the addition of "M" for additional material.

Title	Year	Medium	Dimensions	Edition size	Public collection(s)	1997 CR no.	Foundation cat. no.	Notes
Pedro and Pablo [Formerly titled]	1980	Black and white photograph	14 x 11 in	1		A1	AM1	
[No title]	c. early 1980s	Black and white photographs, photostat on cardboard	11 x 27 15/16 in	1		A2	AM2	
[No title]	c. early 1980s	Black and white photographs, photostat on cardboard	11 x 27 15/16 in	1		A3	AM3	
[No title]	1983	Black and white photograph, framed	Frame 15 x 12 1/2 in, image 3 3/4 x 4 3/4 in	1		A4	AM4	
[No title]	1983	Black and white photograph, framed	Frame 15 x 12 1/8 in, image 4 3/4 x 3 3/4 in	1		A5	AM5	
[No title]	c.1983	Black and white photograph, framed	Frame 15 x 12 1/8 in, image 3 3/4 x 4 3/4 in	1		A6	AM6	
[No title]	c.1983	Black and white photograph, framed	Frame 14 x 11 in, image 3 5/8 x 4 5/8 in	1		A7	AM7	
"Self Portrait with Feather" [Formerly titled]	c.1983	Palladium print	6 5/8 x 5 in (paper size)	1		A8	AM8	
[No title]	c.1983	Black and white photograph, framed	Frame 15 x 12 1/8 in, image 3 3/4 x 4 5/8 in	1		A9	AM9	
[No title]	c.1983	Palladium print	5 3/4 x 7 5/8 in (paper size)	1		A10	AM10	
[No title]	c.1985	Black and white photograph, framed	Frame 4 3/4 x 5 1/2 in, image 2 7/8 x 3 5/8 in	1		A11	AM11	
[No title]	1985	Black and white Polaroid	2 7/8 x 2 3/4 in	1	Metropolitan Museum of Art, New York	A12	AM12	
[No title]	1986	C-print, tinted red	8 1/4 x 12 1/4 in	1		A13	AM13	
[No title]	1986	C-print, tinted blue	17 x 24 in	1		A14	AM14	
[No title]	1986	C-print, tinted red	9 x 12 in	1		A15	AM15	
[No title]	c.1986	C-print, tinted red, framed	Frame 10 3/8 x 8 3/8 in, image 9 5/8 x 7 5/8 in	1		A16	AM16	Similar to formal work "Untitled" (Madrid 1971) (1988)
"The Lord's Wish" [Formerly titled]	1986	C-print, tinted green, framed	Frame 9 1/4 x 11 3/4 in, image 8 1/4 x 10 3/4 in	1		A17	AM17	
"Untitled" [Formerly titled]	c.1987	Oil and collage on canvas	18 1/8 x 14 1/8 in	1		A18	AM18	
"Untitled" [Formerly titled]	1987	Duratrans print on magazine paper, framed	8 15/16 x 11 in	1		A19	AM19	Similar to formal work "Untitled" (1987) [GF1987-001]
[No title]	c.1987	C-print, framed	Frame 9 x 11 in, image 7 3/4 x 9 3/4 in	1		A20	AM20	
[No title]	c.1987	Gold paint on blue paper	10 x 14 in	1		A21	AM21	
[No title]	c.1987	Ironing board, transfer text	31 3/4 x 12 x 1 1/2 in	1		A22	AM22	
"Untitled" [Formerly titled]	1987	Photostat, framed	8 1/8 x 10 1/8 in	1		A23	AM23	Similar to formal work "Untitled" (1987) [GF1987-019]
"Untitled" [Formerly titled]	1987	Photostat	8 x 10 in	1		A24	AM24	Similar to formal work "Untitled" (1987) [GF1987-001]
"Perfect Lovers" [Formerly titled]	1987	Clocks	9 3/4 x 19 1/2 x 2 1/2 in	1		A25	AM25	Similar to formal works "Untitled" (Perfect Lovers) (1987-1990) [GF1990-040] and "Untitled" (Perfect Lovers) (1991) [GF1991-007]
[No title]	1987	Glass bottle, newsprint	10 1/4 x 4 1/8 x 2 5/8 in	1		A26	AM26	Similar to formal works "Untitled" (1987) [GF1987-005, -023, and -024] and "Untitled" (Fear) (1987) [GF1987-022]
"Untitled" [Formerly titled]	1987	Acrylic, newsprint on canvas	15 7/8 x 19 7/8 in	1		A27	AM27	Similar to formal works "Untitled" (1987) [GF1987-008] and "Untitled" (Double Fear) (1987) [GF1987-015, -016, and -017]
[No title]	c.1987	Acrylic, newsprint on canvas	Diameter 10 in	1		A28	AM28	Similar to formal works "Untitled" (1987) [GF1987-005] and "Untitled" (Fear) (1987) [GF1987-015, -016, and -017]
[No title]	c.1987	C-print	8 1/4 x 9 3/8 in (paper size)	1		A29	AM29	
[No title]	1987	China plates with lacquered c-prints	Two parts, diameter 5 15/16 in each	1		A30	AM30	From the same group of plates as formal work "Untitled" (1987) [GF1987-003]
[No title]	c.1987	C-print, framed	Frame 7 5/8 x 9 5/8 in, image 6 5/8 x 8 5/8 in	1		A31	AM31	
[No title]	1988	China plates with lacquered c-prints	Two parts, diameter 8 in each	1		A32	AM32	From the same group of plates as formal work "Untitled" (1987) [GF1987-003]
"Untitled" [Formerly titled]	1988	Photostat	8 x 10 in	1		A33	AM33	Similar to formal work "Untitled" (1988) [GF1988-005]
"Untitled" [Formerly titled]	1988	Photostat	6 1/2 x 9 in	1		A34	AM34	Similar to formal work "Untitled" (1988) [GF1988-032]
[No title]	c.1988	Photostat, framed	10 3/8 x 11 5/8 in	1		A35	AM35	
"Untitled" (Paris) [Formerly titled]	1988	Chromogenic print	12 5/8 x 19 1/8 in	1	Art Institute of Chicago	A37	AM37	
[No title]	c.1988	C-print, framed	Frame 8 7/8 x 11 in, image 7 5/8 x 9 3/4 in	1		A38	AM38	
"Untitled" (Warm Water) [Formerly titled]	1988	C-print jigsaw puzzle	7 1/2 x 9 1/2 in	2		A39	AM39	Similar to formal work "Untitled" (Warm Water) (1988)
[No title]	1988	C-print, framed	Frame 15 3/4 x 17 1/4 in, image 7 5/8 x 9 3/4 in	1		A40	AM40	
[No title]	1989	Offset print on paper, framed	9 1/16 x 11 1/2 in	5		A41	AM41	Single framed sheets from formal work "Untitled" (Still Life) (1989)
"Bloodwork" [Formerly titled]	1989	Graphite and gouache on paper	12 1/8 x 9 in	1		A42	AM42	
[No title]	c.1989	Black and white Polaroid	3 3/8 x 4 1/4 in	1		A43	AM43	
[No title]	c.1990	C-print	33 1/2 x 20 in	1		A44	AM44	Source image for formal work "Untitled" (The New Plan) (1991)
"Untitled" (Natural History) [Formerly titled]	1990	Black and white photograph	11 x 14 in (paper size)	1		A45	AM45	Similar to photograph J (Scholar) from formal work "Untitled" (Natural History) (1990)
Untitled graph (blood work) [Formerly titled]	1990	Graphite and gouache on paper	12 1/2 x 9 3/8 in	1		A46	AM46	Similar to formal works "Untitled" (t-cell count) (1990) [GF1990-023, -024, -025, -026, and -027]
[No title]	c.1991	Ink on white cardboard	9 x 9 in	1		A47	AM47	Source image for formal work "Untitled (Long Line of Life) (1991) [GF1991-058]
"Untitled" (Alice B. Toklas' and Gertrude Stein's Grave, Paris) [Formerly titled]	1992	C-print, framed (one unframed)	5 x 7 in (first version, paper size); frame 14 1/2 x 17 in, image 8 x 10 in (second version); frame 13 3/4 x 16 1/2 in, image 6 x 9 3/4 in (third version)	3		A48	AM48	Similar to formal work "Untitled" (Alice B. Toklas' and Gertrude Stein's Grave, Paris) (1992)
"Untitled" (1992) [Formerly titled]	1992	Photostat, framed	12 5/8 x 16 5/8 in	1		A49	AM49	Similar to formal work "Untitled" (1992) (1992) [GF1992-022]
[No title]	1992	Plastic photo album	6 3/8 x 4 5/8 in	1		A50	AM50	
[No title]	1993	C-print	15 1/4 x 22 3/4 in	1		A51	AM51	Similar to formal work "Untitled" (Loverboy) (1988) [GF1988-011]
"Untitled" (A Walk in the Snow) [Formerly titled]	1993	C-print	Two parts, 8 x 10 in each	1		A52	AM52	Similar to formal works "Untitled" (A Walk in the Snow) (1993) [GF1993-001 and -002]
[No title]	1993	Graphite, offset print on tissue paper	11 x 8 1/2 in	1		A53	AM53	
"Untitled" (Sand) [Formerly titled]	1993/1994	Photogravure on Somerset Satin paper	12 3/4 x 15 3/4 in	1		A54	AM54	Single sheets from formal work "Untitled" (Sand) (1993-1994)

== Citations and references ==
=== Cited references ===
- Elger, Dietmar, ed. (1997). Felix Gonzalez-Torres. Vol. 2. Ostfildern: Hatje Cantz Verlag. ISBN 9783893228836.
