= Aroldingen =

Aroldingen is a German surname. Notable people with the surname include:

- Georg Reinbold von Aroldingen und Eltzingen (fl. mid-nineteenth century), German military officer
- Karin von Aroldingen (1941–2018), German ballerina
