= Weber Typefoundry =

German type foundry

C.E. Weber Typefoundry
- Type: Aktiengesellschaft
- Industry: Type foundry
- Founded: 1827
- Defunct: 1970
- Headquarters: Stuttgart, Germany
- Key people: Georg Trump

C.E. Weber was a German type foundry established in 1827 in Stuttgart. Noted designers working for the foundry included Georg Trump, and Ernst Schneidler. The foundry closed in 1970; some designs passed to the Johannes Wagner Type Foundry, others to Stempel.

== Typefaces ==
Foundry types produced by C.E. Weber:

- Amati (1951, Georg Trump)
- Codex (1954-56, Georg Trump)
- Delphin (1951-55, Georg Trump)
- Deutsch Römisch (1926, F. H. E. Schneidler)
- Forelle (1936, Erich Mollowitz), originally cast by Trennert as Rheingold. Also copied by Stephenson Blake as Mercury.
- Forum (Georg Trump)
- Holländisch (1922 - 26, Peter A. Demeter)
- Hollandse Mediaeval (1912, S. H. De Roos), later sold by Intertype as Mediaeval.
- Jaguar (1967, Georg Trump)
- Mauritius (1965, Georg Trump)
- Mimosa, a knock-off of Copperplate Gothic, later cast by Typoart.
- Palomba (1955, Georg Trump)
- Schadow (1938-52, Georg Trump)
- Signum (1955, Georg Trump)
- Time (1956, Georg Trump)
- Trump Mediaeval (1954, Georg Trump), also made by Linotype (Frankfurt).
