= Georg =

Georg may refer to:

- Georg (film), 1997
- Georg (musical), Estonian musical
- Georg (given name)
- Georg (surname)
- MV Georg, a Kriegsmarine coastal tanker
- Spiders Georg, an Internet meme

== See also ==
- George (disambiguation)
