= Spiders Georg =

Internet meme

"average person eats 3 spiders a year" factoid actualy [sic] just statistical error. average person eats 0 spiders per year. Spiders Georg, who lives in cave & eats over 10,000 each day, is an outlier adn [sic] should not have been counted

— Max Lavergne, Tumblr

"Spiders Georg" is an internet meme that began circulating on the microblogging website Tumblr in 2013. It was created by Max Lavergne as a humorous post involving a common misconception about the average number of spiders accidentally swallowed per year by each human. The post saw an increase in popularity the following year, and the format of the meme has been adapted to other topics, mimicking the spelling and grammatical errors of the original post.

== History ==
"Spiders Georg" was first posted about in 2013 by Max Lavergne; it is based on the misconception that humans swallow some number of spiders a year inadvertently. While not true, the factoid has become an urban legend. "Spiders Georg" satirizes the factoid by offering its own explanation for the statistic, creating a fictional character who skews the average by eating over ten thousand spiders daily. In statistics, an outlier is a data point that is very different from the other observations and therefore changes the average (mean) noticeably. The number of spiders eaten by Spiders Georg, as compared to all other people, is an outlier in this sense.

The meme amassed more than 90,000 notes on the platform by the end of 2013. That year, The Daily Dot gave it as an example of Tumblr's "truly weird" memetic subculture, contrasting it with the more conventional posts that the website's 2013 Year in Review featured. Users frequently remake and remix the meme to center around different topics, such as The Beatles' lyric "we all live in a yellow submarine" and "#NotAllMen". Many of the reposts observe the spelling and grammar errors contained in the original post. The post has inspired a Spiders-Georg–themed blog on Tumblr, and users have reported having dreams about "Spiders Georg" or attempted to calculate how many spiders he would have to eat to make the urban legend true. One calculation suggests that Spiders Georg would need to eat 65 million spiders per day for the global average to be 3 per year.

== Impact and legacy ==
In their book Tumblr, authors Katrin Tiidenberg, Natalie Ann Hendry, and Crystal Abidin use the meme to underscore their argument that Tumblr's impact cannot be well-understood through simple mean averages, noting that when one user cited USA Today's estimate that the average user spends a mere 2.5 hours per month on Tumblr, another user responded saying "average person spends 0 hours per month. We Georg, who live in caves & spend over 23 hours on Tumblr each day, are outliers adn [sic] should not have been counted".

In August 2023, Business Insider referred to Donald Trump as the "'Spiders Georg' of world leaders", as his indictments on 91 felony counts yielded the statistic that the average number of felony charges per U.S. president was two.

== See also ==
- Cultural depictions of spiders
