= Julius Sturm =

German poet (1816–1896)

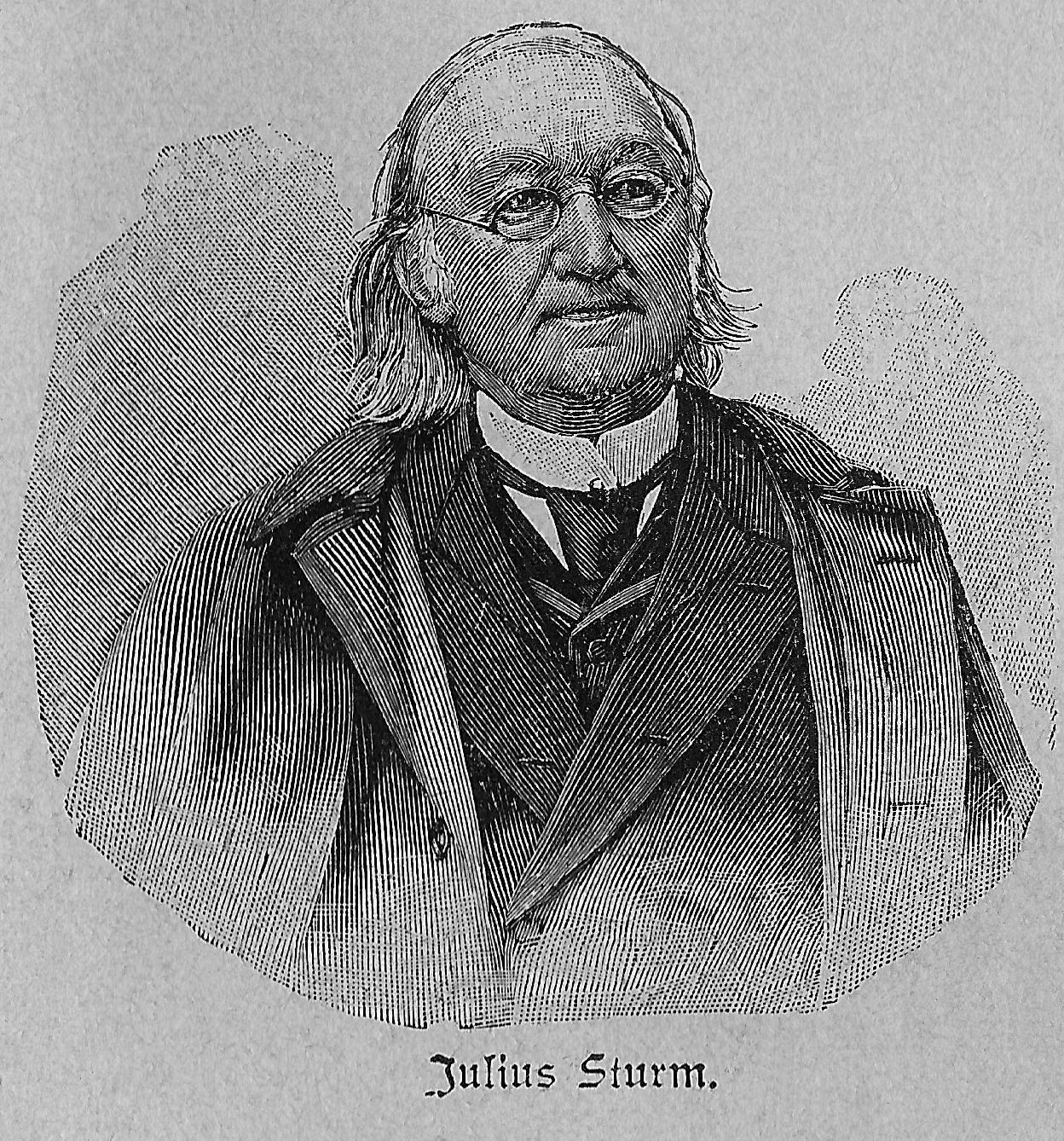
Julius Sturm

Julius Sturm (21 July 1816 – 2 May 1896) German poet, was born at Köstritz in the principality of Reuss.

He studied theology at Jena from 1837 to 1841, and was appointed preceptor to the hereditary prince Heinrich XIV, Prince Reuss Younger Line. In 1851 he became pastor of Göschitz near Schleiz, and in 1857 at his native village of Köstritz. In 1885 he retired with the title of Geheimkirchen rat. He died in Leipzig.

Sturm was a writer of lyrics and sonnets and of church poetry, breathing a spirit of deep piety and patriotism. His religious poems were published in:

- Fromme Lieder (Devout Songs and Poems; pt. i., Leipzig, 1852; 12th edition, 1893; pt. ii., 1858; pt. iii., 1892)
- Zwei Rosen, oder das hohe Lied der Liebe (Two Roses, or the Canticle of Love; Leipzig, 1854; 2nd edition, 1892)
- Israelitische Lieder (Israelite Songs; 3rd edition, Halle, 1881)
- Palme und Krone (Palm and Crown; Leipzig, 1888)

His chief lyrics were issued in:

- Gedichte (6th edition, Leipzig, 1892)
- Neue Gedichte (2nd edition, Leipzig, 1880)
- Lieder und Bilder (2nd edition, 1892)
- Kampf- und Siegergedichte (Poems of Battle and Victory; Halle, 1870)
- Neue Lieder (1880, 2nd edition, 1888)
- Neue lyrische Gedichte (Leipzig)
- In Freud und Leid, letzte Lieder (1896).

== Family ==
His son August Sturm (born 1852) was also a noted poet as well as being a lawyer. He was born at Göschitz, and studied at Jena, Leipzig, and Berlin, first theology, afterwards law, which he began practicing at Naumburg in 1884, having in the meanwhile lived as assessor at Rudolstadt (1880–82) and, given to literary pursuits, in Berlin (1882–84).

Besides the epic poems, Merlin (1892), Kaiser Friedrich der Edle (1896), König Laurins Rosengarten (1897), and Der König von Babel (1902), he published Hohenzollernsagen and Balladen (1898), the lyrics Auf Flügeln des Gesanges (On wings of song, 1883), Lied und Leben (1889), Auf der Höhe (1902), and others, several dramas and the sketches in prose, Sylter Skizzen (1887).

He also wrote a series of juridical works, notably Revision der gemeinrechtlichen Lehre vom Gewohnheitsrecht (1900).

His son Heinrich Sturm (1860–1917) was a jurist and politician, and mayor of Chemnitz 1908–1917.
