= Harry Gersh =

American historian

Harry Gersh (December 1, 1912 – July 30, 2001) was an American writer and historian. He was the oldest known student ever to enroll as a freshman at Harvard College. Before enrolling in school he was a writer for over 50 years.

Gersh was born on December 1, 1912, to Solomon and Devorah (Lampert) Gersh on in New York City. He served in the United States Navy during World War II.

He died on July 30, 2001, in Columbia, Maryland.

== Bibliography ==
- Laughter of Israel (196?)
- Minority Report (1961)
- Women who made America great (1962)
- The Sacred Books of the Jews – Page 1 (1968)
- When a Jew Celebrates (1971)
- Mishnah: The Oral Law (1984)
- Midrash: Rabbinic Lore (1985)
- Talmud: Law and Commentary (1986)
- Kabbalah (1989)
