= Georg Trump =

German designer

- Born: 10 July 1896; Germany
- Died: 21 December 1985 (aged 89)
- Education: Student of F. H. E. Schneidler
- Occupations: Graphic designer, typeface designer, postage stamp designer
- Known for: Trump Mediaeval (1954); City (c. 1931); Schadow

Georg Trump (10 July 1896 – 21 December 1985) was a German graphics, typeface and postage stamp designer, known for designs such as the book typeface Trump Mediaeval (1954), the slab serif City (c. 1931) and the condensed, industrial Schadow.

Trump fought in both WWI and WWII, the latter of which left him severely wounded. He studied under Friedrich Hermann Ernst Schneidler, and was a fellow lecturer with Jan Tschichold in Munich. He worked for the Berthold Type Foundry and then the Weber Type Foundry in Stuttgart.
