= Trump Mediaeval =

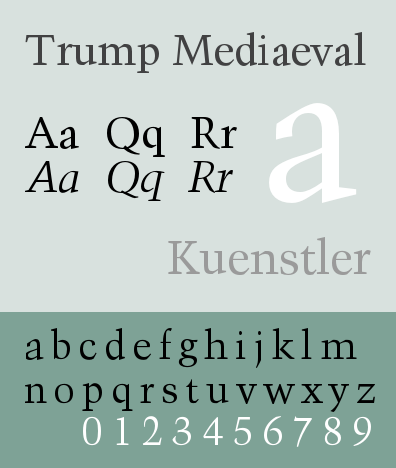
- Category: Serif
- Classification: Old style serif
- Designer(s): Georg Trump
- Foundry: C. E. Weber, Linotype
- Date created: 1954

Trump Mediaeval (also German Trump Mediäval) is an old-style serif typeface designed by Georg Trump. It was released in 1954 both by the C. E. Weber foundry as metal type and Linotype for hot metal typesetting. Despite a common association with blackletter typefaces, the mediaeval name refers to the German typographical term for roman typefaces dark in color like the old style Venetian typefaces.

Prominent examples of its use include the 1975 Gotteslob, the A Song of Ice and Fire novels, and the portrait works of Felix Gonzalez-Torres.

== Digital variants ==
- Trump Mediaeval, Linotype
- Trump Mediäval, Adobe
- Kuenstler 480, Bitstream
