= Georg Gassner (lawyer) =

German lawyer during Nazi era

Georg Gaßner

President of the Regional Labour Office, Mark Brandenburg
- In office 1934–1945

Personal details
- Born: December 4, 1883 Berlin, German Empire
- Died: November 18, 1951 (aged 67) Berlin-Charlottenburg, West Germany
- Party: NSDAP
- Occupation: Jurist, civil servant

Georg Gaßner, also spelled Georg Gassner (4 December 1883 – 18 November 1951) was a German administrative lawyer. He served as president of the Regional Labour Office (Gauarbeitsamt) of Mark Brandenburg during the Nazi era.

== Biography ==
Gaßner was the son of Georg Gaßner, a senior military hospital assistant, and grew up in Berlin. After completing school he studied law at the universities of Tübingen and Berlin. In 1906 he entered the state service as a legal trainee (Gerichtsreferendar). From 1919 onward, he worked in the Reich Ministry of Labour.

In 1927 he became president of the Regional Labour Office (Landesarbeitsamt) of East Prussia, and in 1934 he was transferred to the same position in Brandenburg.

He joined the Nazi Party (NSDAP) on 1 May 1933 (membership number 1,845,920). After World War II, in 1949, Gaßner was classified as “Category V” (exonerated) during the denazification process. He died two years later in Berlin-Charlottenburg, holding the title of President of the Regional Labour Office Berlin-Brandenburg, retired.
