= Örjan =

- Pronunciation: /ørjan/
- Gender: Masculine

Origin
- Origin: Jurian
- Meaning: Farmer
- Region of origin: Sweden

Other names
- Derived: Scandinavian name, meaning "farmer"
- Related names: Ørjan, George

Örjan (OErjan) is an old Swedish male name originating from the Low German name Jurian or Jurien which is a variant of George. The Name Day in Sweden is July 9. The Norwegian version of the name is Ørjan.

The name has been present in Sweden since the Middle Ages as (Yrian). The saint called St George elsewhere in Europe was then called Sankt Örjan or Riddar Örjan (Knight Örjan), (nowadays normally Sankt Göran). The name was very popular at this time. The name evolved during the 16th century to Jöran or Göran, and the original name became uncommon. In the mid 20th century the name had a brief renaissance.

In Sweden there were in total 3147 persons with the firstname Örjan. The name is mainly only used in Sweden and Norway.

Country	Men			Boys		
Country	Amount	Percent	Rank	Amount	Percent	Rank
Norway Ørjan	3,511 (2006)	0.15 %	151.	45 (2006)	0.15 %	140.
Sweden Örjan	5 898 (2013)	0.13 %	-	(2010)	-	(> 100.)

In Finland 41 men have been baptised to Örjan during 1920 to 2008.

== Persons with the name Örjan/Ørjan ==
- Örjan Berner, Swedish diplomat
- Örjan Birgersson, Swedish football player
- Örjan Blomquist, Swedish cross country skier and winner of Vasaloppet
- Örjan Fahlström, Swedish composer
- Ørjan Hartveit (born 1982), Norwegian classical singer
- Örjan Karlsson, bass player in the Swedish boy band The Pinks
- Örjan Kihlström, Swedish coachman
- Ørjan Larsen, Norwegian Esports player
- Örjan Martinsson, Swedish football player
- Örjan Modin, Swedish bandy player
- Ørjan Nilsen, Norwegian music producer
- Örjan Nordling, Swedish font designer
- Ørjan Nyland, Norwegian footballer
- Örjan Örnkloo, Swedish musician and producer
- Örjan Ouchterlony, Swedish professor of bacteriology
- Örjan Persson, Swedish football player
- Örjan Ramberg, Swedish actor
- Örjan Sölvell, Swedish professor
- Ørjan Stedjeberg (born 1977), Norwegian musician
