= Georg, Baron von Örtzen =

German writer

Georg, Baron von Örtzen (2 February 1829–27 May 1910), also known as Karl Friedrich Theodor Ludwig, was a German poet and prose-writer.

== Life ==
He was born at Brunn in Mecklenburg-Schwerin. He served as an officer of Prussian hussars (1850–1855), entered the consular service and after employment at New York City (1879) and Istanbul (1880) was appointed to Marseille (1881), and then to Christiania (1889), retiring in 1892.

He published about thirty volumes, mostly of lyrics and aphorisms, including Gedichte ("Poems", 3rd ed. 1861), Aus den Kämpfen des Lebens (i868), Deutsche Träume, deutsche Siege (1876), Epigramme und Epiloge in Prosa (1880), Es war ein Traum (1902). His Erlebnisse und Studien in der Gegenwart (Leipzig, 1875) appeared under the pseudonym Ludwig Robert, and Nacht (Stuttgart, 1899), a collection of sonnets, under that of Stephen Ervésy.

He was acquainted with Fritz Reuter.
