= Georg Reinbold von Aroldingen und Eltzingen =

German military officer

Georg Reinbold von Aroldingen und Eltzingen was a German nobleman and military officer who served as a major general in the Austro-Hungarian Army.

== Biography ==
Von Aroldingen was originally from the Kingdom of Hanover. His family were part of the German nobility.

He served as a colonel in the 69th Infantry Regiment of the Austro-Hungarian Army from 1860 until 1 November 1867, when he retired with the rank of major general.
