= Georgii =

Georgii may refer to:

Given name

- Georgii Zantaraia (born 1987), Ukrainian judoka of Georgian origin
- Georgii Karpechenko (1899–1941) Russian and Soviet biologist
- Georgii Frederiks (1889–1938), Russian geologist
- Georgii Zeliony (1878–1951), Russian physiologist
- Georgii Stackelberg (1851–1913), cavalry general in the Imperial Russian Army
- Georgii Nadson (1867–1939), Soviet biologist
- Georgii Cherkin (born 1977), Bulgarian pianist
- Georgii Yurii Pfeiffer (1872–1946) Ukrainian and Soviet mathematician
- Georgii Stenberg (1900–1933) Soviet artist and designer; see Stenberg brothers
- Georgii Merkulov (born 2000), Russian ice hockey player
- Georgii Gurtsiev (born 2000), Belarusian taekwondo practitioner

Other

- Psalterium Georgii, constellation created by Maximilian Hell in 1789
- Magnolia georgii, species of plant in the family Magnoliaceae
- Rhacophorus georgii, species of frog in the family Rhacophoridae
- Tetrapturus georgii, see Roundscale spearfish
- Russian battleship Georgii Pobedonosets
- Russian submarine K-433 Svyatoy Georgiy Pobedonosets
- Russian landing ship Georgy Pobedonosets
- St George the Conqueror Chapel Mausoleum

== See also ==
- Georgi (disambiguation)
- Georgy (disambiguation)
- Georgiy, given name
- Georgie (disambiguation)
- George (disambiguation)
- Heorhiy (disambiguation)
