= George =

George may refer to:

== Names ==
- George (given name)
- George (surname)

== People ==
- George (singer), American-Canadian singer George Nozuka, known by the mononym George
- George Papagheorghe, also known as Jorge / GEØRGE
- Giorgio Moroder (stage name "George")
- George, son of Andrew I of Hungary

== Places ==
=== South Africa ===
- George, Western Cape, a city
  - George Airport

=== United States ===
- George, Iowa, a city
- George, Missouri, a ghost town
- George, Washington, a city
- George County, Mississippi
- George Air Force Base, a former U.S. Air Force base in California

== Computing ==
- George (algebraic compiler) also known as 'Laning and Zierler system', an algebraic compiler by Laning and Zierler in 1952
- GEORGE (computer), early computer built by Argonne National Laboratory in 1957
- GEORGE (operating system), a range of operating systems (George 1–4) for the ICT 1900 range of computers in the 1960s
- GEORGE (programming language), an autocode system invented by Charles Leonard Hamblin in 1957
- George (robot), a simple humanoid robot built by Tony Sale in 1949

== Film and television ==
- George (1972 TV series), a Canadian-Swiss television series
- George (1993 TV series), a short-lived sitcom starring George Foreman
- George, the sixth MGM lion
- "George" (M*A*S*H), a 1974 episode of the television series M*A*S*H

== Literature ==
- George (magazine), founded by John F. Kennedy, Jr.
- George (novel), 2016, by Alex Gino
- (George), a 1970 novel by E. L. Konigsburg

== Music ==
- George (band), an Australian band
- George (EP), by Cartman
- "George" (song), by Headless Chickens
- "George", a 1959 spoken word track by Joyce Grenfell

== Transport ==
- Autopilot, affectionately known as "George"
- George (bus service), in Falls Church, Virginia, US
- George (ship), an Australian sloop wrecked in 1806
- Kawanishi N1K-J, a Japanese fighter aircraft Allied codenamed "George"
- Pullman porters, often referred to as "George"

== Animals ==
- George (dog), a Jack Russell Terrier who defended children from a two-dog attack
- George (lobster)
- George (snail)
- Lonesome George, the last Pinta Island tortoise

== Other uses ==
- George (club), a members club on Mount Street in London's Mayfair district
- George (fashion label), a clothing brand sold exclusively in Walmart and Asda stores
- George (vacuum cleaner)
- Greenhouse George, a nuclear bomb

== See also ==
- Georg (disambiguation)
- George Bridge (disambiguation)
- George Street (disambiguation)
- Lake George (disambiguation)
- List of hurricanes named Georges
- Tropical Storm George (disambiguation)
- Georgi (disambiguation)
- Georgia (disambiguation)
- Georgie (disambiguation)
- Georgii (disambiguation)
- Georgina (disambiguation)
- Georgy (disambiguation)
- Gorge (disambiguation)
- The George (disambiguation)
