= Heorhiy =

Heorhiy (pronounced [ɦeˈɔrɦij]) or Heorhy (pronounced [ɦeˈɔrɦɪ]) is used in Ukrainian (and occasionally Belarusian) as the equivalent of George or Georgiy. People with the name include:

- Heorhiy Buschan (born 1994), Ukrainian football goalkeeper
- Heorhiy Gina (1932–2025), Ukrainian musician and composer
- Heorhiy Gongadze (1969 – 2000), Ukrainian journalist of Georgian origin
- Heorhiy Kandratsyew (born 1960) Soviet Belarusian football player
- Heorhiy Kirpa (1946 – 2004), Ukrainian railway manager, statesman and politician
- Heorhiy Maiboroda (1913 – 1992), Ukrainian composer
- Heorhiy Pohosov (born 1960), Soviet/Ukrainian sabre fencer
- Heorhiy Pyatakov (1890 – 1937), Bolshevik revolutionary leader
- Heorhiy Sudakov (born 2002), Ukrainian footballer
- Heorhy Tkachenko (1898 – 1993), Ukrainian artist and bandurist

== See also ==
- Georgy (disambiguation)
- Georgii (disambiguation)
- Georgie (disambiguation)
- George (disambiguation)
