= Cherkin =

Cherkin may refer to:

- Georgii Cherkin (born 1977), Bulgarian pianist
- Cherkin, Iran, a village in Chaharmahal and Bakhtiari Province, Iran
