= Georgi =

Georgi may refer to:

- Georgi (given name)
- Georgi (surname)

== See also ==
- Georgy (disambiguation)
- Georgii (disambiguation)
