= Georgie =

Georgie is a unisex given name, often a hypocorism of Georgina, Georgiana, or George. Bearers of the name include:

== People ==
=== Given name or nickname ===
==== Women ====
- Georgina Born (born 1955), British musician and academic
- Georgie Badiel (born 1985), Burkinabé model and activist, Miss Burkina Faso in 2003 and Miss Africa 2004
- Georgie Boynton Child (1873–1945), American efficiency expert, writer and business manager
- Georgina Georgie Clarke (born 1984), Australian middle-distance runner
- Eileen Georgina Georgie Collins (1925–2017), Canadian actress
- Georgina Georgie Crozier (born 1963), Australian politician
- Georgie Dagger (born 1997), English rugby league player
- Georgiana Drew (1856–1893), American stage actress and comedienne, member of the Barrymore acting family
- Georgina Friedrichs (born 1995), Australian rugby sevens player
- Georgie Starbuck Galbraith (1909–1980), American poet and writer
- Georgie Gardner (born 1970), Australian television and news presenter and journalist
- Georgina Georgie Gaskin (1866–1934), English jewellery and metalwork designer and illustrator
- Georgina Georgie Gent (born 1988), English tennis player
- Georgie Anne Geyer (1935–2019), American journalist
- Georgie Glen (born 1956), Scottish actress
- Georgina Georgie Henley (born 1995), English actress
- Georgina Georgie Howe (born 1994), Australian racing cyclist and former rower
- Georgiana Georgie A. Hulse McLeod (1835–1890), American author, educator and temperance activist
- Georgina Georgie Parker (born 1964), Australian actress
- Georgina Georgie Parker (field hockey) (born 1989), Australian rules footballer and former field hockey player
- Georgie Purcell (born 1992), Australian politician
- Georgie Stone (born 2000), Australian actress, writer and transgender rights advocate
- Georgie Thompson (born 1977), British television presenter
- Georgie Tunny (born 1991), Australian journalist and television presenter
- Georgina Georgie Twigg (born 1990), English field hockey player
- Georgie White (1911–1992), river-running guide in the Grand Canyon, first woman to run the Grand Canyon as a commercial enterprise

==== Men ====
- Georgie Aldous (born 1998), British social activist, model and influencer
- Georgie Auld (1919–1990), Canadian-American jazz tenor saxophonist, clarinetist and bandleader
- George Best (1946–2005), Northern Irish footballer
- Georgie Farmer (born 2001), British actor
- George Jessel (actor) (1898–1981), American actor and comedian
- George Georgie Kelly (born 1996), Irish footballer
- Robert Georgie Nokes (1936–1986), American child actor
- George Pocheptsov (born 1992), sometimes referred to as "Georgie", American painter, draughtsman and entrepreneur
- George Georgie Stoll (1905–1985), American musical director, conductor, Academy Award-winning composer and jazz violinist
- Georgie Torres (born 1957), Puerto Rican basketball player
- Georgie Welcome (born 1985), Honduran footballer

=== Stage or pen name ===
- Georgie Dann, stage name of French singer-songwriter Georges Mayer Dahan (1940–2021)
- Georgie Davis, stage name of Dutch singer Kees Rietveld (born 1969)
- Georgie Fame and Georgie Fortune, stage names of English R&B and jazz musician Clive Powell (born 1943)
- Georgie Boyden St. John, pen name of American composer Georgia Boyden St. John (1861–1899)
- George E. Stone or Georgie Stone, stage name of Polish-born American character actor born Gerschon Lichtenstein (1903–1967)
- Georgie Tapps, American tap dancer born Mortimer Alphonse Becker (1907–1997)
- Wee Georgie Wood, stage name of British comic entertainer and actor George Wood Bamlett (1895–1979)

== Fictional characters ==
- Georgie Cooper, in Young Sheldon and Georgie & Mandy's First Marriage
- Georgie Denbrough, in Stephen King's horror novel It
- Georgie Jones, in the American soap opera General Hospital
- Georgie Lane, in the British television series Our Girl
- Georgie Santorelli, a character from The Sopranos
- the title character of the nursery rhyme "Georgie Porgie"
- the title character of Georgie!, a 1982–84 manga series
- the title character of "The Killing of Georgie (Part I and II)", a song written and recorded by Rod Stewart
- the title character of "Poor Georgie", a song by hip-hop artist MC Lyte
- the title character of Master Georgie, a 1998 historical novel by Beryl Bainbridge

== See also ==
- Georgie Pie, a New Zealand former fast food chain
- Georgies
- Giorgi (disambiguation)
- Georgy (disambiguation)
- Georgia (disambiguation)
- Giorgio (disambiguation)
