= Tsarska Bistritsa =

Palace in Rila, Bulgaria

Coordinates: 42°15′30″N 23°35′44″E

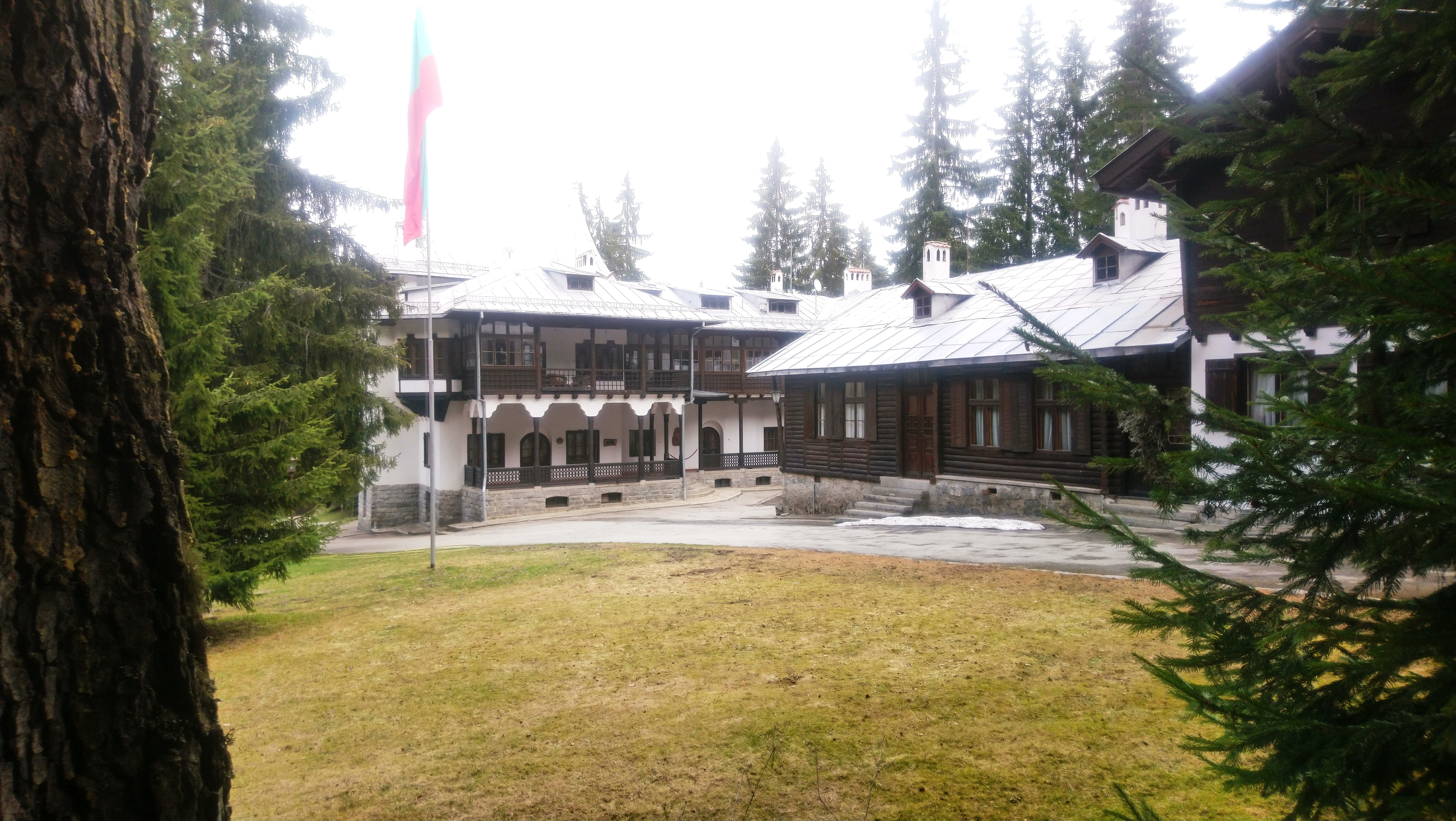
Tsarska Bistritsa hunting lodge

Tsarska Bistritsa ("Tsar's Bistritsa"; Bulgarian: Царска Бистрица) is a former royal palace in southwestern Bulgaria, high in the Rila Mountains, just above the resort of Borovets and near the banks of the Bistritsa River. The hunting lodge was built between 1898 and 1914, it served as the hunting lodge of Tsar Ferdinand of Bulgaria and his son Boris III.

== History ==
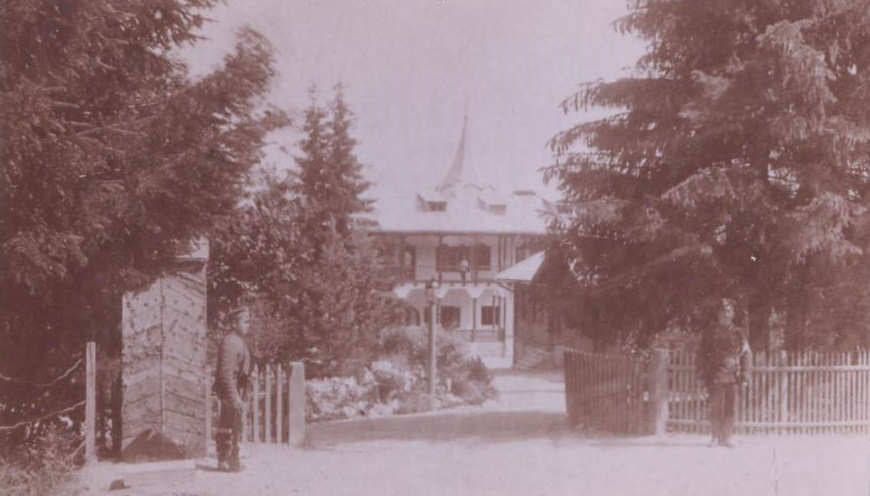
Tsarska Bistritsa hunting lodge in 1944

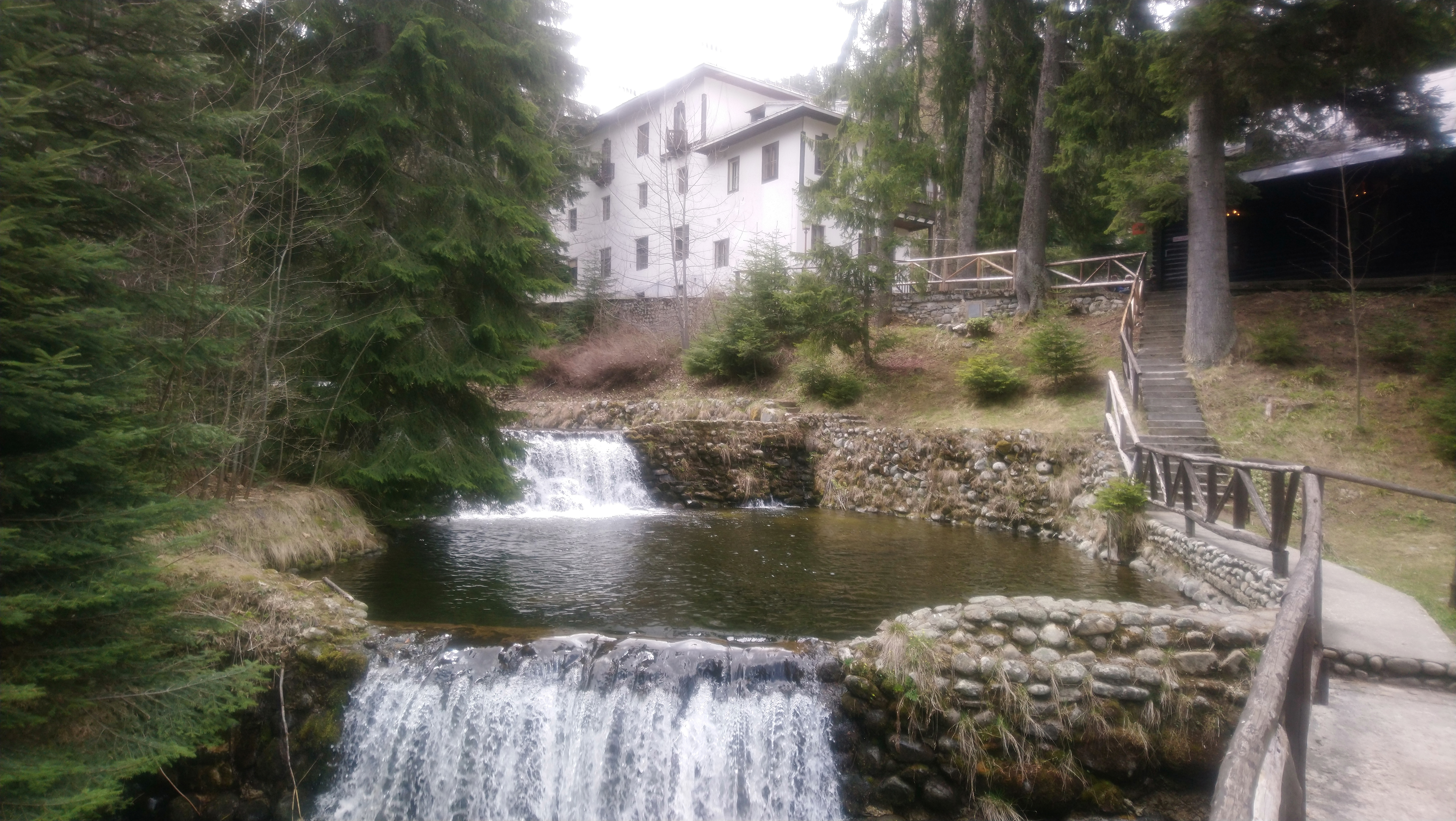
The Bistritsa Musalenska River passes behind the Tsarska Bistritsa hunting lodge

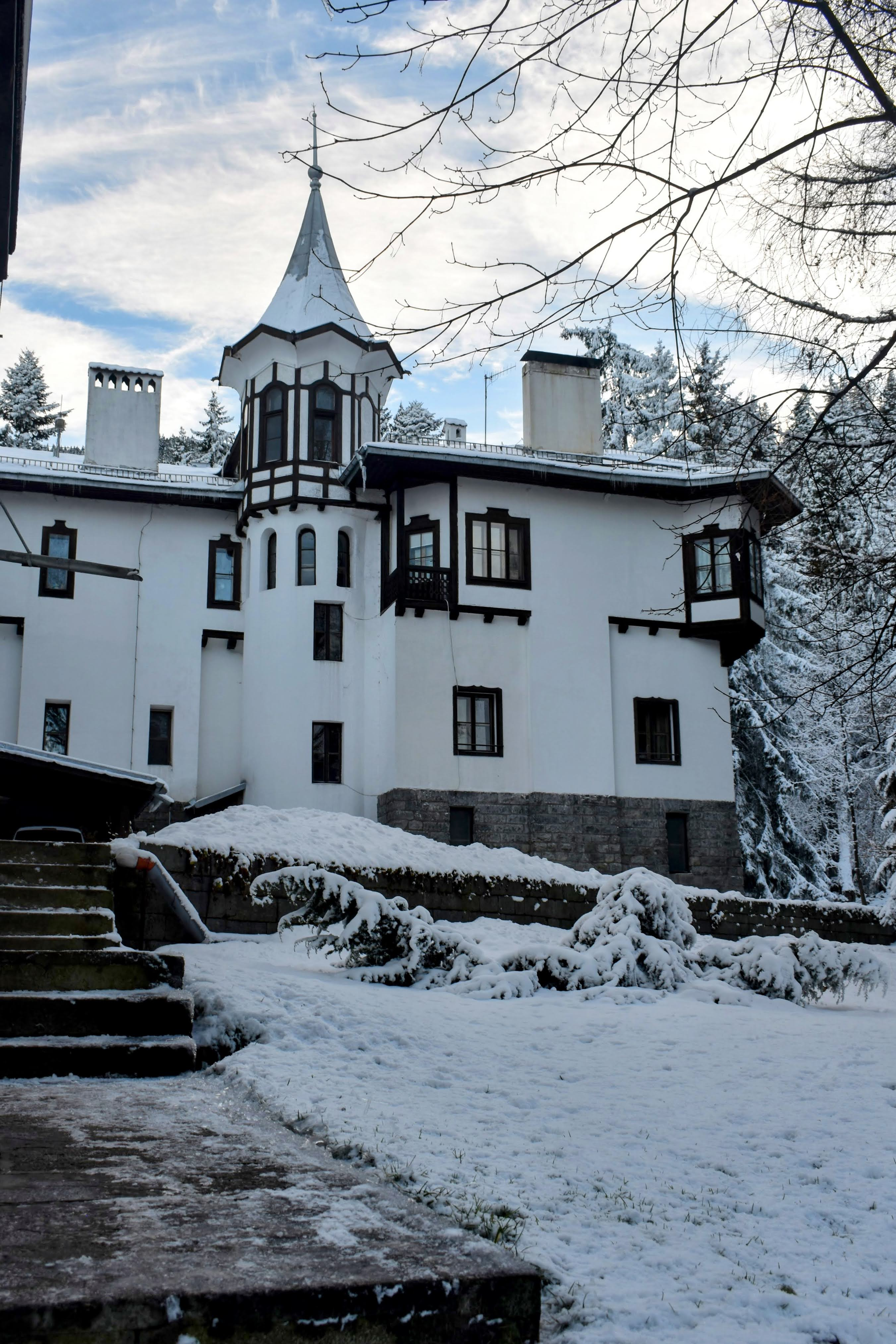
Tsarska Bistritsa hunting lodge during the winter in 2023

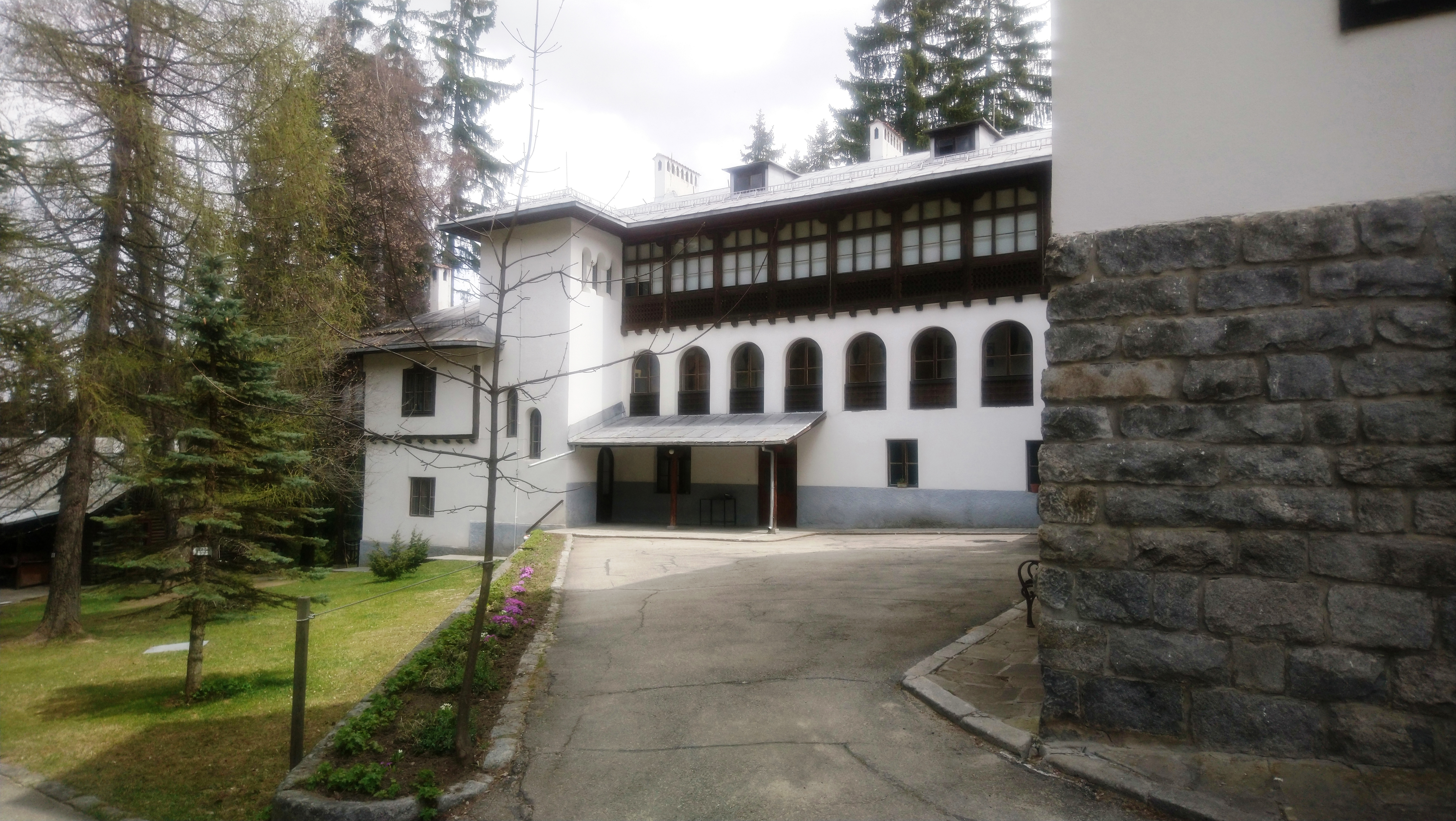
The courtyard of the Tsarska Bistritsa hunting lodge

In 1898, the first wing of the palace, known as the "Old Palace," was constructed. It included several rooms, a study, and bedrooms. Later, under the design of architect Pencho Koychev, two additional wings were added. These featured a spacious living room, a dining room, and a second floor with bedrooms, boudoirs, and another study. By its completion in 1914, the palace had evolved into an entire complex of elegant buildings surrounded by a beautiful park, traversed by the Bistritsa Musalenska River, through which the Bistritsa Musalenska River passes.

Tsarska Bistritsa holds a significant place in the history of Bulgaria's last royal dynasty. It was here, on 28 August 1943, that Queen Joanna received the troubling news that her husband, Boris III, had fallen ill with a mysterious disease. This historic location is also where 6-year-old Simeon II and 9-year-old Maria-Louise saw their father alive for the last time.

After 1945, the Tsarska Bistritsa Palace was nationalized by the new regime in Bulgaria. After the democratic changes in 1989, Tsarska Bistritsa was restituted by the son of Tsar Boris III, Simeon II during his term as Prime Minister of Bulgaria. The palace is open to the public by ordinary citizens. Opening hours are from Thursday to Sunday between 9 am and 5 pm.

The Republic of Bulgaria filed a claim for the ownership and in 2014 the Sofia District Court ruled that the palace was state property and Simeon Saxe-Coburg-Gotha and his sister Maria Luisa had to return it and pay compensation (if the decision entered into force). On 12 October 2020, the Supreme Court of Cassation finally decided the ownership case and returned the palace to Simeon Saxe-Coburg-Gotha and Maria Luisa Chrobok

== Architecture ==
The architecture of Tsarska Bistritsa combines, in the spirit of Romanticism, elements of the authentic Bulgarian National Revival style with other European architectural styles and alpine architecture. A cabin from the transatlantic ship New America is part of the interior. It was either a gift from the captain or won by Ferdinand during a poker game. The wooden ceilings and columns in the lodge are richly decorated in a Bulgarian style. Tsarska Bistritsa also has the royal family's collection of hunting trophies filled up for more than half a century.

The palace is powered by a Siemens AG 170 kW (hydroelectric) generator built and installed in 1912. Other structures include a stable, a chapel, a garage, a sentry box and fountains.

Sitniakovo and Saragiol are also located in the Rila Mountains.

== Gallery ==
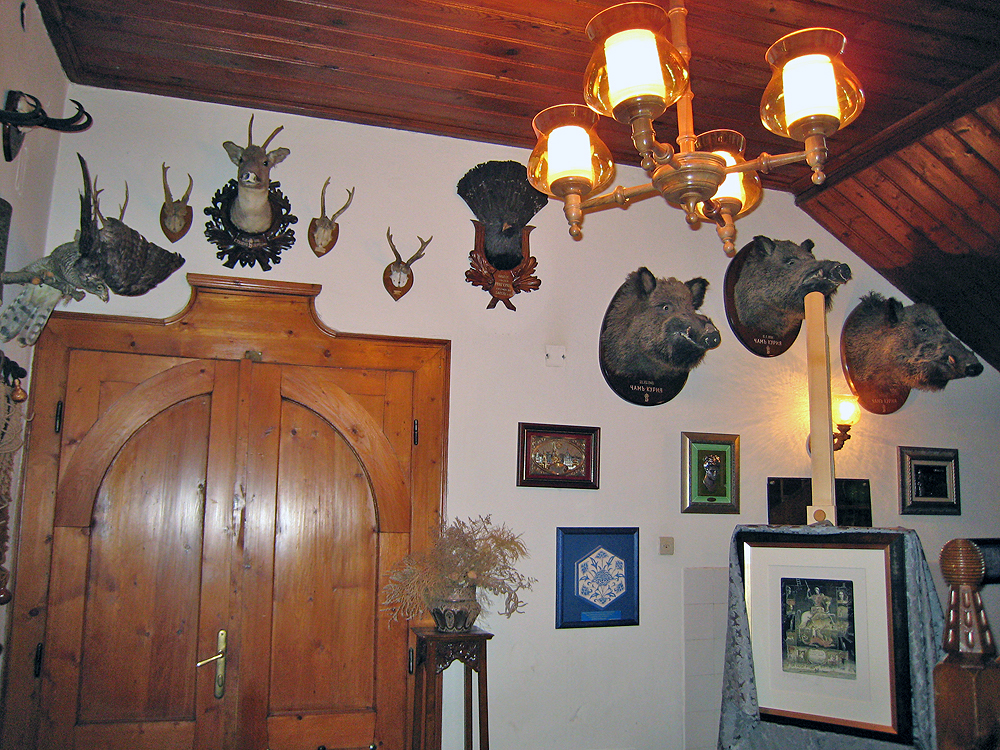
Royal hunting trophies

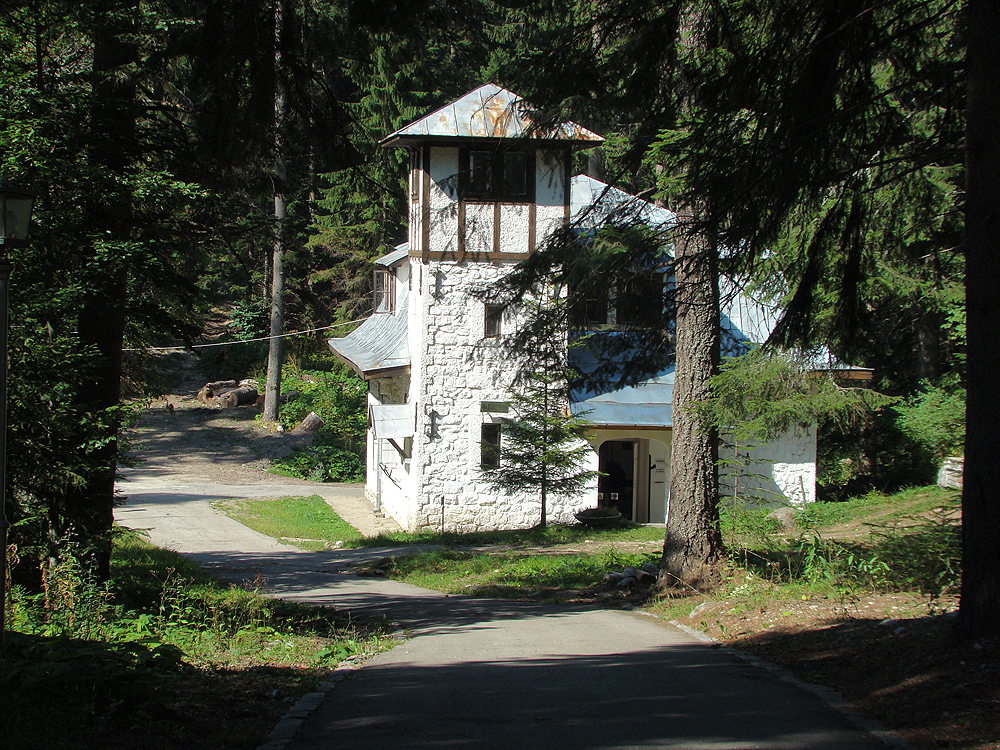
Power station exterior

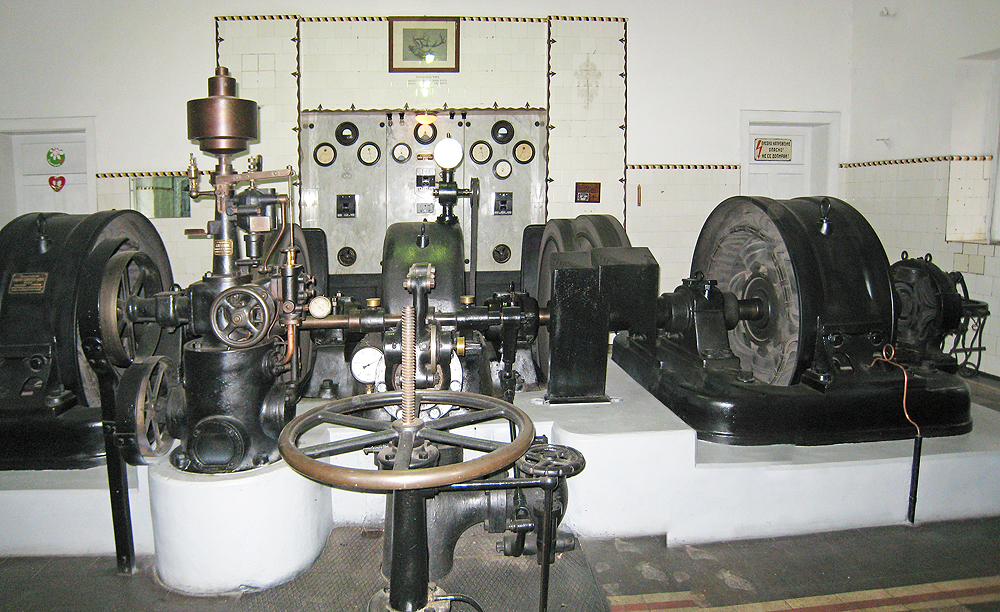
Power station interior
