= Georgy =

Georgy may refer to:

- Georgy (given name), a list of people with the Slavic masculine name Georgy, Georgi or Georgiy
- Georgy, the protagonist in Georgy Girl novel, film, and song
  - Georgy (musical), a musical based on the novel Georgy Girl

== See also ==
- Georgy Hut, a mountain hut in the Swiss Alps
- Georgi (disambiguation)
- Georgie (disambiguation)
- Georgii (disambiguation)
