= George (ship) =

Numerous vessels have borne the name George, including:

- George, of 130, or 147 tons (bm), was launched at Bordeaux in 1801, probably under another name, and taken in prize. In 1802 she received new wales and was raised. Her master changed from W.Buckley to J. Woodstock, her owner changed from G.Smith to [Hamlet] Mullion (and Robert Bibby), and her voyage changed from Cork–Dublin to Liverpool–Africa. Captain James Woodstock sailed from Liverpool on 7 November 1802, on George's first enslaving voyage and arrived at St Vincent from Africa on 7 May 1803 with 191 captives. He sailed for Liverpool on 27 May and arrived there on 16 July. George had left Liverpool with 20 crew members and had suffered eight crew deaths on her voyage. Captain McLeveen (or M'Leven), acquired a letter of marque on 2 December 1803. It showed George armed with fourteen 4 or 9-pounder cannons, and a crew of 25. He sailed from Liverpool on 20 December, on a second enslaving voyage. The French privateer Vengence captured George, M'Leven, master, on 14 May 1804 at Gaboon. In 1804, 30 British enslaving vessels were lost, eight on the coast of Africa. During the period 1793 to 1807, war, rather than maritime hazards or resistance by the captives, was the greatest cause of vessel losses among British slave vessels.
- George (1802 ship) was an Australian sloop of 28 tons (bm) that was wrecked in 1806. She spent her brief career seal hunting in Bass Strait.
- George was the Royal Navy sloop-of-war HMS Talbot launched in 1807 that the Royal Navy sold in 1817. Her new owner renamed her George and between 1818 and 1831 she made three voyages as a whaler, interspersed with voyages to Ceylon and India.
