= The George =

The George may refer to:

- The George, Southwark, London
- The George, Hammersmith, London
- The George, Dublin, gay bar and nightclub
- The George, one of the public houses and inns in Grantham

== Other uses ==
- George Washington Bridge, commonly nicknamed The George
