= Sofia Court House =

Building in Sofia, Bulgaria

Coordinates: 42°41′44″N 23°19′12″E

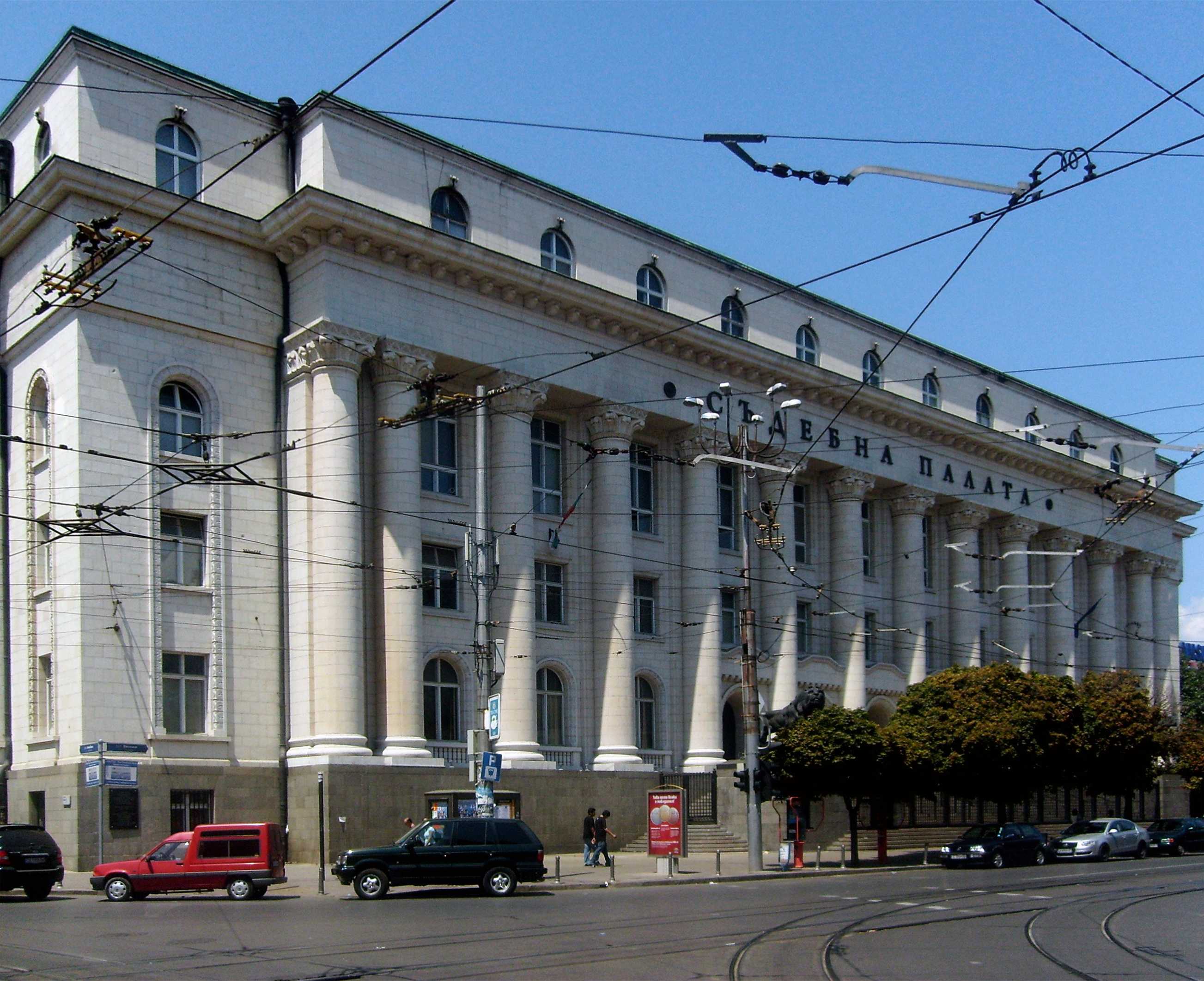
Front view

The Sofia Court House (Bulgarian: Съдебна палата, Sadebna palata, literally Palace of Justice) is a building in Sofia, the capital of Bulgaria, accommodating several courts in the city. Stylistically a simplistic yet monumental structure, it is located on 2 Vitosha Boulevard, surrounded by Alabin Street, Laveleye Street and Positano Street.

The need for a common building to house all the courts in Sofia was raised in 1926 with the foundation of the Judicial Buildings fund. Construction began in 1929 and finished in 1940. While it was the first structure in this strict monumental style in the city, it was followed by the Bulgarian National Bank in the 1930s and the Largo in the 1950s. The initial architectural plan was the work of Nikola Lazarov, later redesigned by Pencho Koychev. The Court House has a syenite plinth, a facing of white limestone and a noticeable cornice below the top floor. The four-storey building (with two additional underground floors) spreads over a ground area of 8,500 square metres and has 430 premises, of which 24 courtrooms, a library and a bank hall, totalling 48,000 square metres of used area.

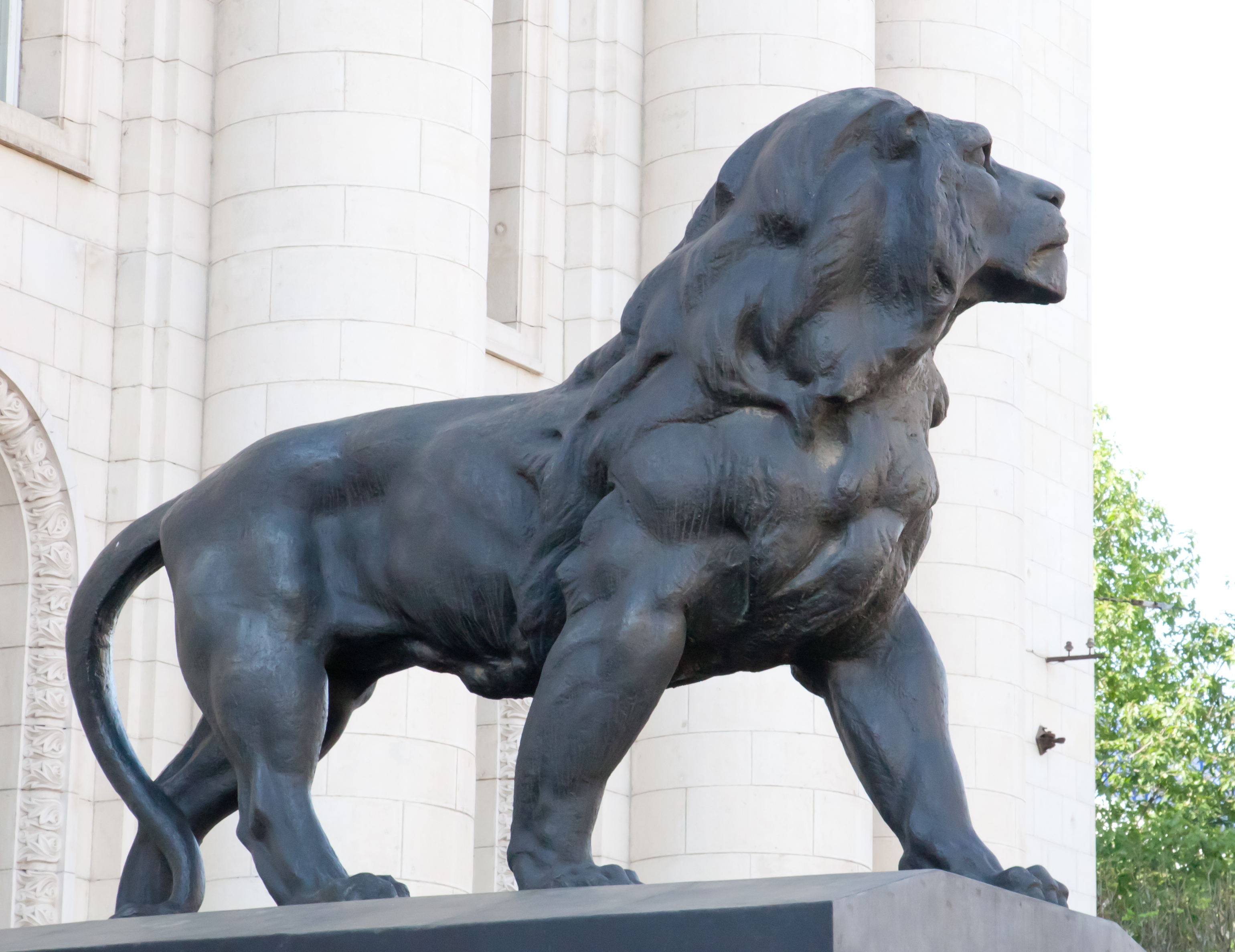
One of the lion statues in front of the Court House

The facade features five large gates and 12 columns. In its style, the Court House is eclectic, uniting several Classical themes, with a fourth floor instead of a baluster, as well as Roman and Byzantine style decorations on the doors, windows and corbels.
