= Pencho Koychev =

Bulgarian architect

- Пенчо Койчев
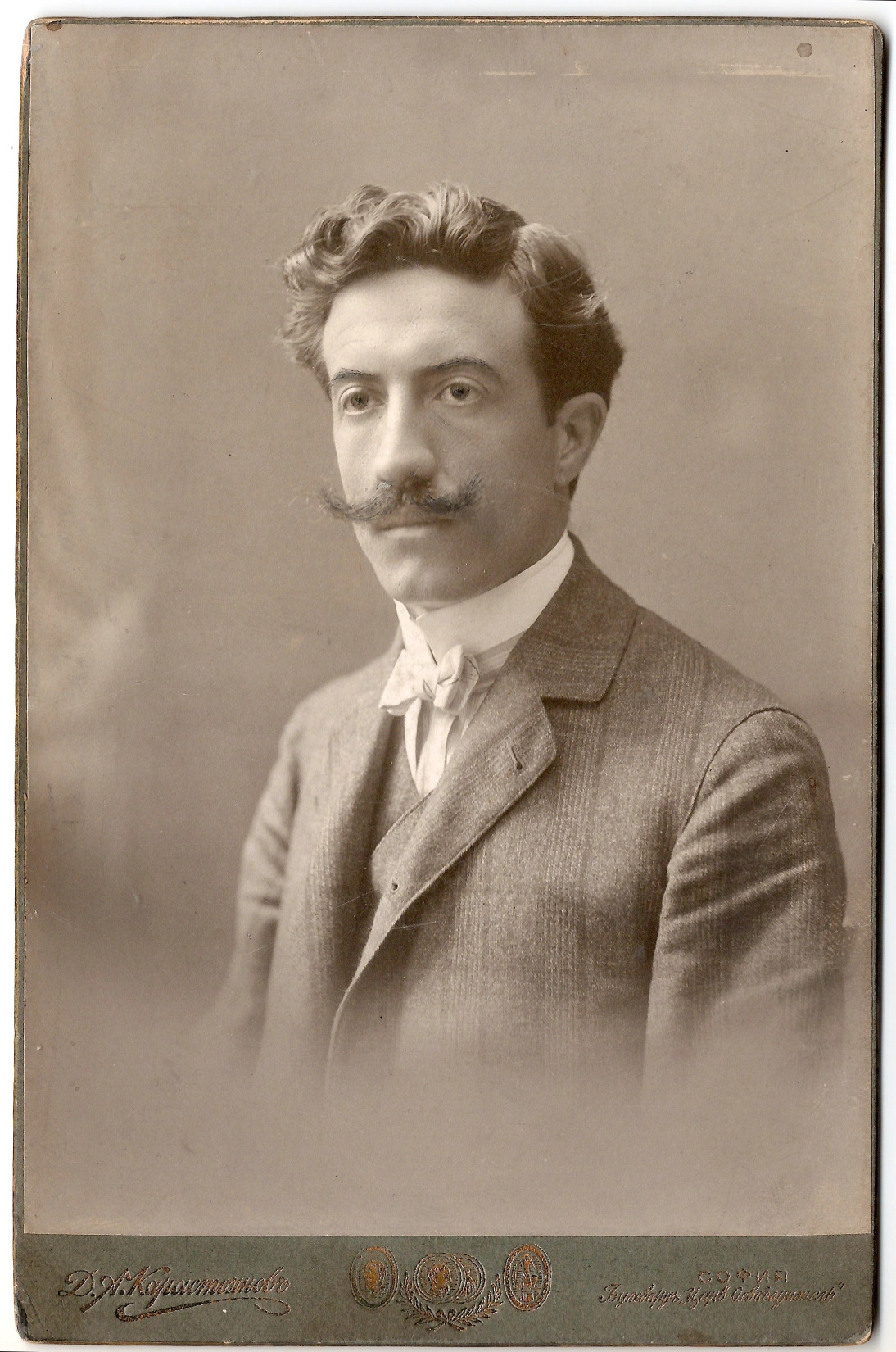
- Born: January 27, 1876; Dryanovo, Ottoman Empire (now Bulgaria)
- Died: January 27, 1957 (aged 81); Sofia, People's Republic of Bulgaria
- Citizenship: Bulgarian
- Education: Ghent University
- Occupation: architect
- Years active: 1902–1940
- Buildings: Pleven Mausoleum, Tsarska Bistritsa, Sofia Court House

Pencho Genchev Koychev (Bulgarian: Пенчо Генчев Койчев; 27 January 1876—27 January 1957) was a Bulgarian architect known for his monumental public buildings.

Pencho Koychev was born in Dryanovo to the professional builder Gencho Radev Koychev and Tsana Docheva. The family moved to Silistra in 1879. He attended middle school in Silistra and high school in Ruse. Koychev studied civil engineering and architecture at Ghent University in Belgium under Louis Cloquet and graduated in 1901 with honours.

Upon his graduation, Koychev returned to the Principality of Bulgaria and worked as the district architect of Pleven, at the Ministry of Public Works and at the Agency for Railway and Harbour Buildings. He taught at the National Academy of Art (1910–1914) and at the Sofia High School of Technology (1914–1917). Since 1924, he headed the Department of Architecture at the Ministry of Public Works.

Pencho Koychev's architecture style was influenced by National Romanticism. The Neo-Byzantine Pleven Mausoleum draws inspiration from medieval architecture, while the Pazardzhik post office and the Tsarska Bistritsa palace are based on the vernacular style of the Bulgarian National Revival. His later works like the court houses in Sofia and Ruse are more strictly classical, austere and monumental. Koychev himself considered his career to have started with his favourite work, the mausoleum in Pleven, and to have ended with his most grandiose design, the court house in Sofia.

== Works ==
- St George the Conqueror Chapel Mausoleum in Pleven (1903)
- Sanatorium for Lung Diseases in Iskrets (1906 or 1908)
- Townhouse at Dondukov 36 in Sofia (1909)
- Old Post Office in Pazardzhik (1910)
- Two wings of the Tsarska Bistritsa Palace in Borovets (1910)
- Railway stations in Vidin, Lom and Svishtov (1917–1919)
- Northern extension of the National Assembly in Sofia (1925)
- Sofia Court House (1928–1940)
- Court houses in Ruse, Tryavna, Botevgrad, Etropole, Novi Pazar, Peshtera, Parvomay (1928–1940)
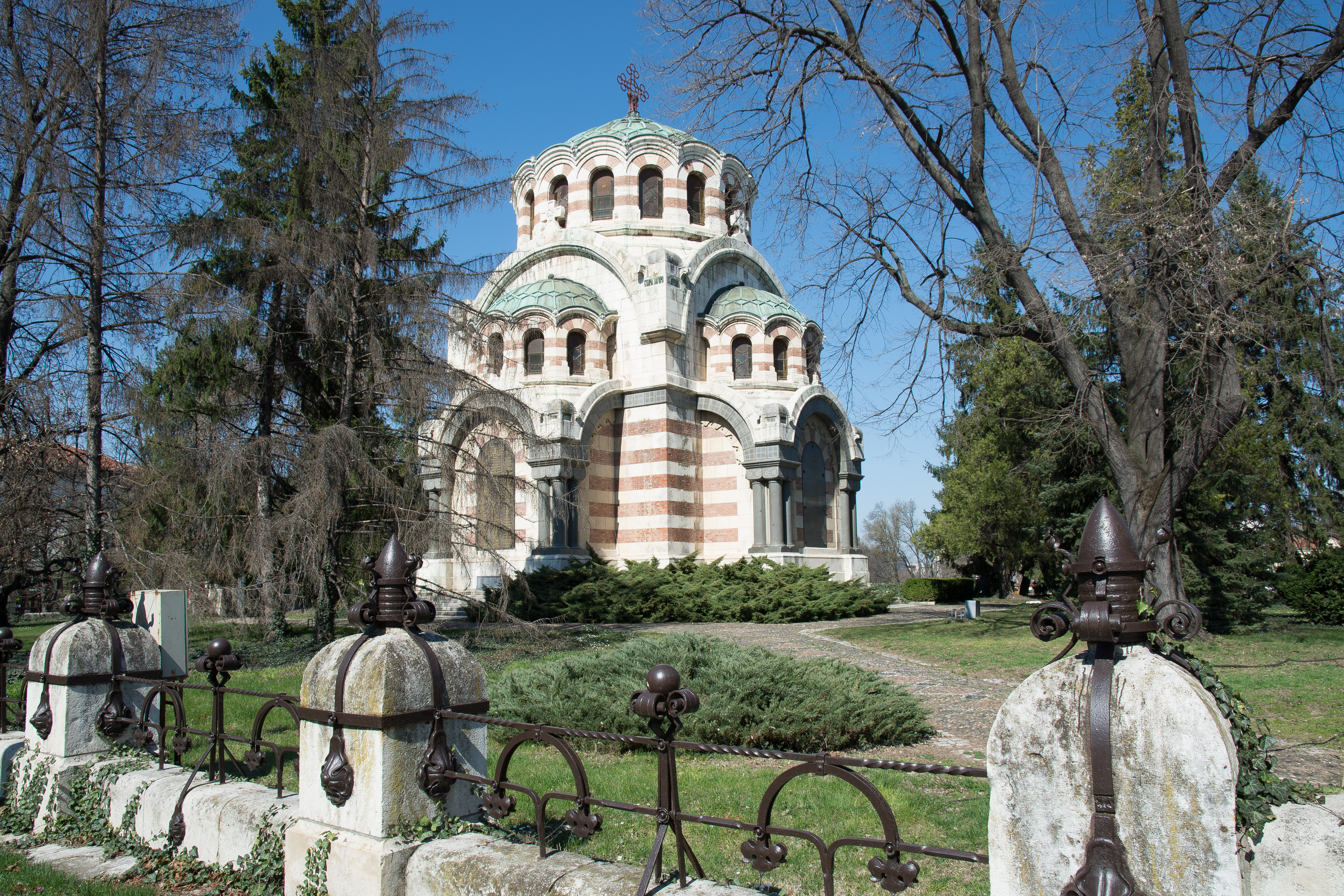
Pleven Mausoleum

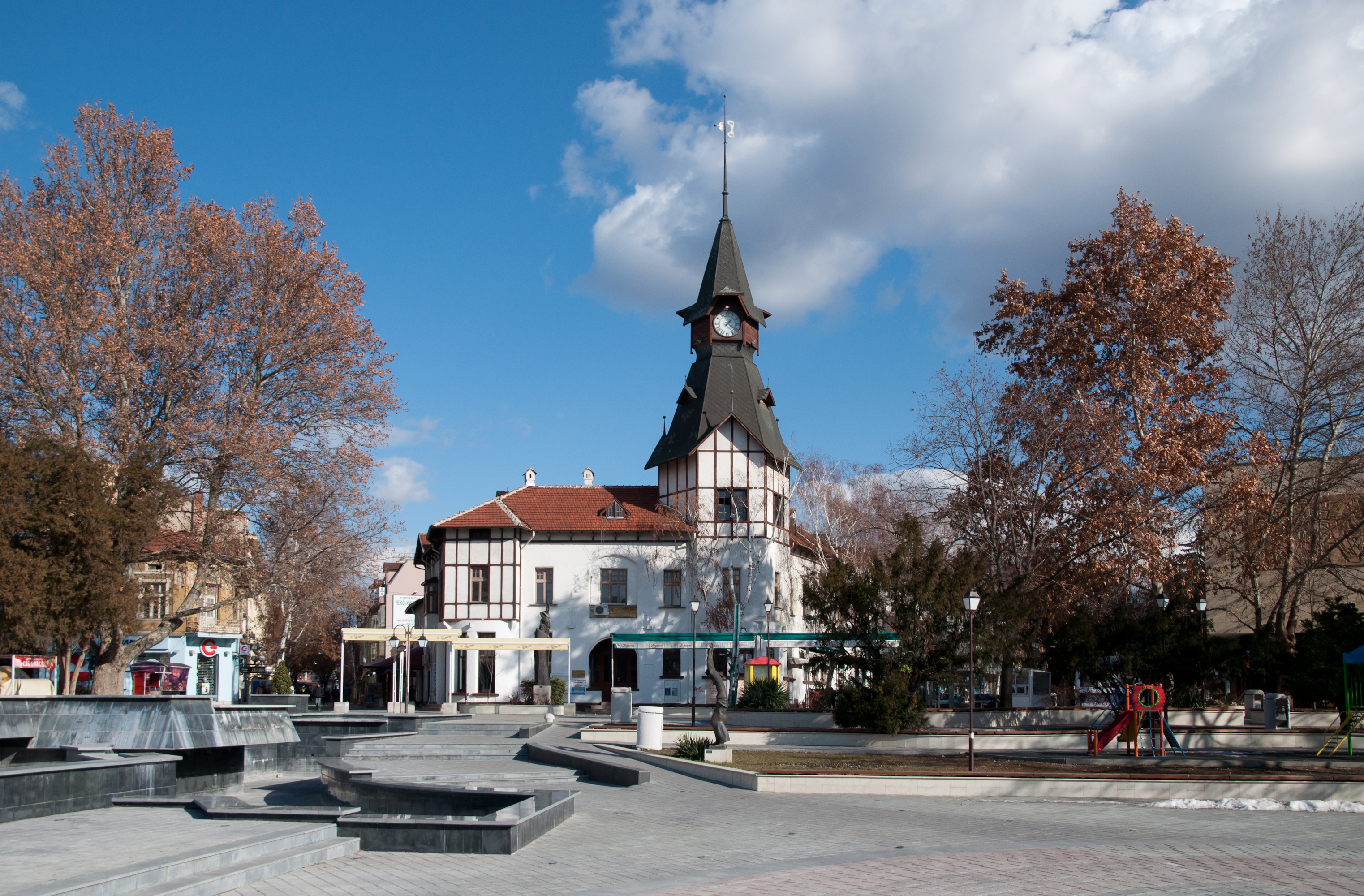
Old Post Office in Pazardzhik

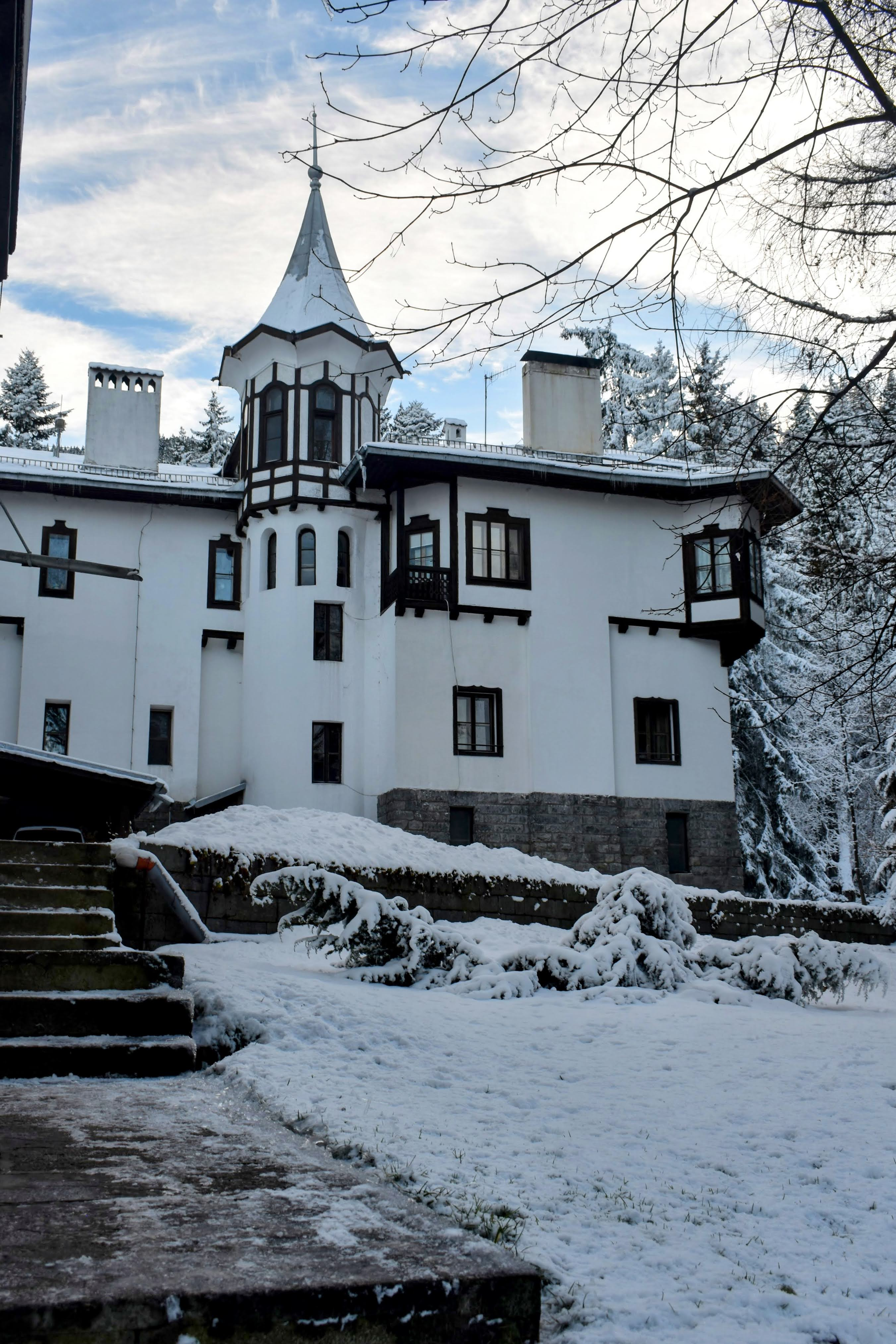
Tsarska Bistritsa Palace in Borovets

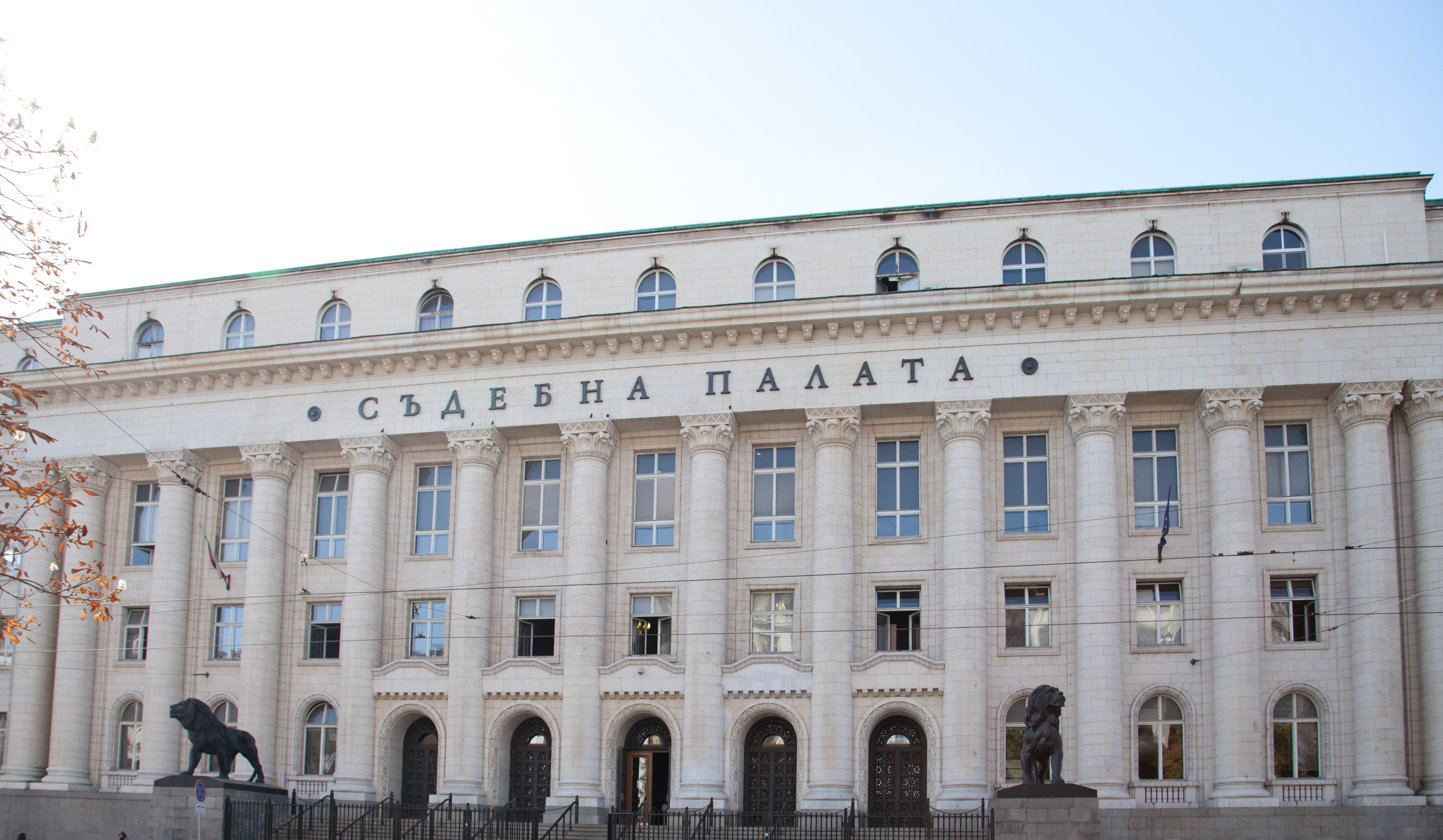
Sofia Court House

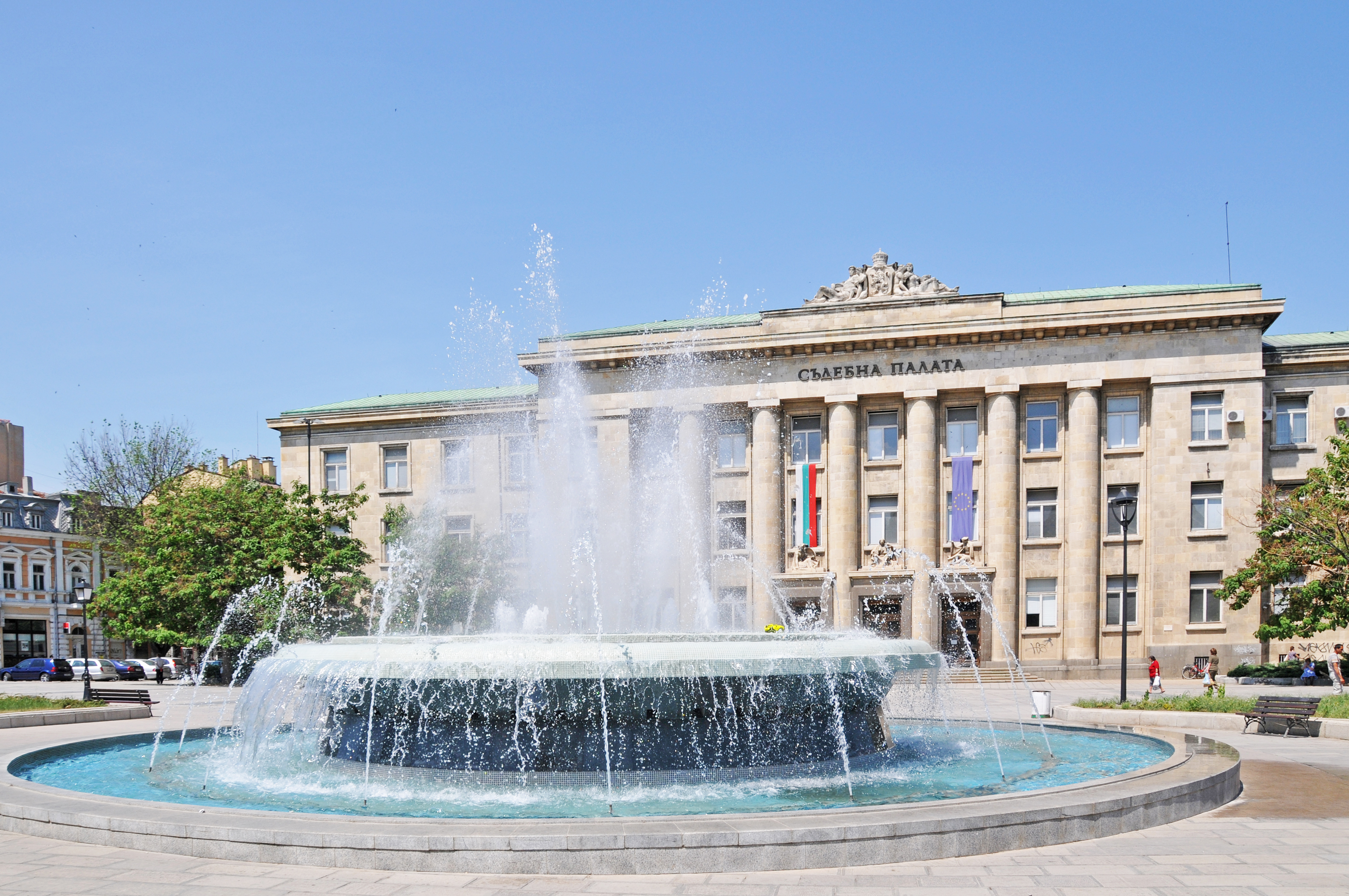
Ruse Court House
