= The George, Hammersmith =

Former pub in Hammersmith, London

Coordinates: 51.493293°N 0.224562°W

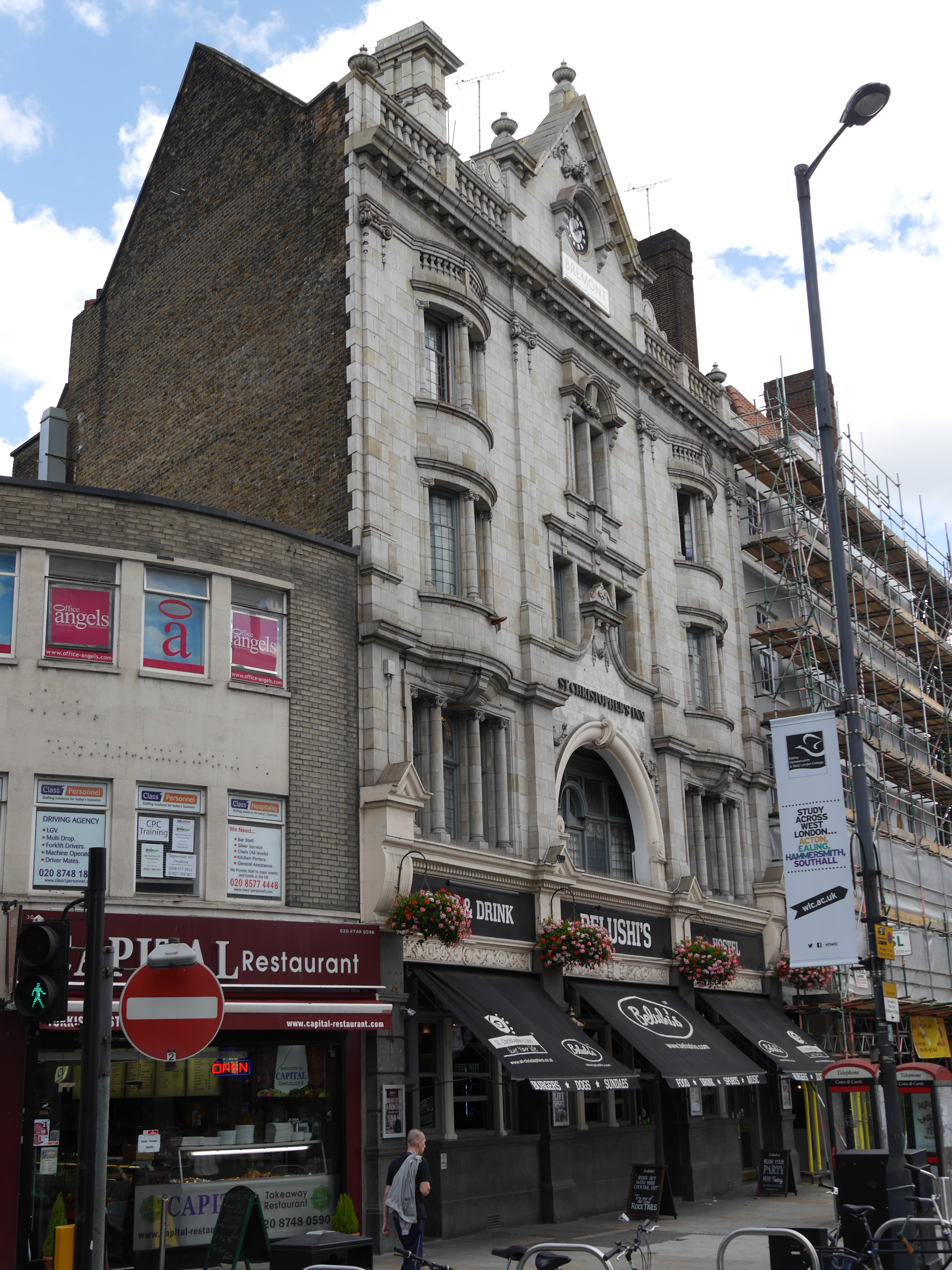
The George, Hammersmith, now a branch of Belushi's

The George is a Grade II listed public house at 28 Hammersmith Broadway, Hammersmith, London.

It was built in 1911, by the architects Nowell Parr and A E Kates.

It is now a branch of the bar/restaurant chain Belushi's.
