= Georgie A. Hulse McLeod =

American author, hymnwriter and temperance activist

- Born: Georgiana Amelia Hulse; 1827; Pensacola, Florida, U.S.
- Died: July 2, 1890 (aged 62–63); Baltimore, Maryland, U.S.
- Occupations: writer; educator; temperance activist
- Spouse: Alexander W. McLeod (m. 1853)
- Children: 3
- Writing career
- Pen name: Mary A. Holmes; Flora Neale
- Genres: novels; short stories; poetry; lyrics

Georgie A. Hulse McLeod (née, Hulse; pen name, various, including Mary A. Holmes and Flora Neale; 1827–1890) was an American author and hymnwriter of Southern United States literature, as well as an educator and temperance activist. She was well known in literary and temperance circles throughout the American South.

For 18 years, she corresponded with Henry Wadsworth Longfellow, who took much interest in her and in her work. She received encouragement from Lydia Sigourney, while Dr. Benjamin Franklin Thompson, the Long Island historian, was also one of McLeod's steadfast friends.

== Early life and education ==
Georgiana (nickname, "Georgie") Amelia Hulse was born was born in 1827, near Pensacola, Florida, at the naval hospital, of which her father was then surgeon. (Note: According to Hulse (1922), Georgie was born in Baltimore, Maryland, in 1835.) She was the daughter of Dr. Isaac Hulse (1797–1856), surgeon of the United States Navy, and Amelia Roberts Hulse (1801–1827), a native of Pensacola. Rev. Dr. George Roberts, of Baltimore was her grandfather. Dr. Thomas Roberts, of Baltimore, was her uncle.

While an infant, Georgie's mother died, and she was reared by her grandparents in Baltimore. (Note: According to Hulse (1922), Georgie was brought up under the direction of a Miss Thomas, after the death of her mother.) In her childhood, she mingled in French society, the naval officers of French men-of-war ships being frequent guests of her father when in port.

She evinced a taste for literature while still a girl. In order to complete her education, she was sent to a convent, where she remained several years. While still a girl, she contributed to several periodicals under various pen names.

While in school, she wrote Sunbeams and Shadows. It was published by the Appletons, New York, soon after completing her education, some time prior to 1853. Also written while at school and published by Appleton & Co. was Aunt Minnie's Portfolio.

== Career ==
In 1853, she married the Rev. Dr. Alexander W. McLeod, of Halifax, Nova Scotia, where for a time they resided. He was a Canadian divine and editor of the official organ of the Wesleyan Methodists of the lower provinces. Their children were: Isaac, Nelly, and Daisy.

In Halifax, she published, Ivy Leaves from the Old Homestead, which contains both prose and poems. This was soon followed by Thine and Mine and Seadrift, which was published by Messrs. Derby & Jackson in New York City.

Since the end of the civil war, she published Sea-Drifts (1867), a collection of largely serious stories embracing poems. It deals mainly with school-girls, their ways and thoughts, their joys and trials. McLeod was also the author of Bright Memories, very similar to Sea-Drifts, except possibly more religious. There is great similarity among these volumes. They are eminently moral, sometimes religious, and always temperate in being removed from the sensational and melodramatic. She completed a book for juveniles, entitled Standing Guard, and a novel, The Old, Old Story.

McLeod was a constant contributor to magazines, in the North and the South, under the signature of "Flora Neale", and other noms de plume. McLeod also wrote lyrics to several hymns. A very industrious writer, she considered her writing as a recreation.

In the 1860s, she was the Principal of the Southern Literary Institute, Baltimore, where many Southern girls from the best families were educated. She gave free tuition to one young lady, the daughter of a deceased Confederate soldier, from each Southern State.

McLeod was the secretary of the Woman's Christian Temperance Union (W.C.T.U.) of Maryland and the Southern secretary for the National W.C.T.U.

== Later life and death ==
She was writing a prohibition story, entitled Unprotected Home, when taken sick. Georgie A. Hulse McLeod died at Baltimore, July 2, 1890.

== Selected works ==
=== Books ===
- Sunbeams and Shadows, and Buds and Blossoms; or, Leaves from Aunt Minnie's Portfolio, 1851 (text)
- Buds and Blossoms, sequel to Sunbeams and Shadows, September 1851
- Ivy Leaves from An Old Homestead, 1857, prose and verse
- Mine and Thine; or, The Step Mother's Reward, 1857
- Sea-drifts, 1864
- Zarvona, 1865
- Bright Memories, In Memoriam Amelia Hulse Roberts, 1866
- How Jessie Came Out of the Shadows, 1872
- God's Jewels, 1874
- Standing Guard
- The Old, Old Story

=== Hymn lyrics ===
- "Are the Boys Safe Tonight?"
- "Home at Last"
- "Like the Snowflakes"
- "Marching on to Battle"
- "The Swelling of Jordan"
