= Georgi Shangin =

Russian ice hockey player (born 1989)

- Born: February 21, 1989 (age 36); Yekaterinburg, Russian SFSR, Soviet Union
- Height: 6 ft 4 in (193 cm)
- Weight: 196 lb (89 kg; 14 st 0 lb)
- Position: Defence
- Shot: Right
- Played for: Spartak Moscow
- Playing career: 2008–2017

Georgi Shangin (born February 21, 1989) is a Russian former professional ice hockey defenceman.

Shangin played one game in the Kontinental Hockey League for Spartak Moscow during the 2011–12 season. He also played in Vysshaya Liga for CSK VVS Samara and the Supreme Hockey League for Dynamo Tver, Sokol Krasnoyarsk, Zauralie Kurgan, HC Sarov and Ariada Volzhsk.
