= Georgy Pfeiffer =

Russian and Soviet mathematician (1872–1946)

Georgii (Yurii) Pfeiffer
- Георгий Васильевич Пфейффер
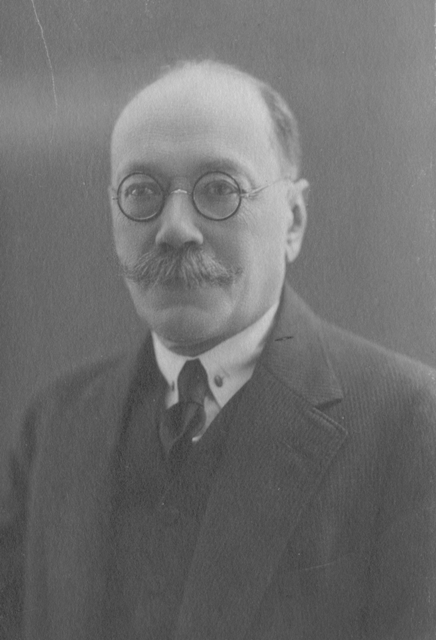
- Born: 23 December 1872; Poltava Governorate, Russian Empire
- Died: 10 October 1946 (aged 73); Kiev, Soviet Union (now Kyiv, Ukraine)
- Education: Saint Vladimir Imperial University of Kiev
- Scientific career
- Fields: Mathematics
- Workplaces: Kiev Polytechnic Institute of Emperor Alexander II

Georgy Pfeiffer, also Yurii or Yury Pfeiffer (Russian: Гео́ргий Васи́льевич Пфе́йффер; German: Georg Ferdinand Pfeiffer; 23 December 1872 – 10 October 1946), was a Russian and Soviet mathematician of German descent. Pfeiffer was known as a specialist in the field of integration of differential equations and systems of partial differential equations. He was also interested in algebraic geometry.

He was an Invited Speaker of the International Congress of Mathematicians (ICM) in 1908 at Rome, in 1928 at Bologna, and in 1932 at Zurich. He was a chairman of the Academic Council of the Faculty of Physics and Mathematics at the University of Kiev, Russian Empire. Pfeiffer was also attached to the Institute of Mathematics of the Academy of Sciences of the Ukrainian SSR in Kiev and served as Director during two periods, namely 1934 to 1941 and again from 1944 until his death in 1946. In the three years 1941–44, Pfeiffer was in Ufa, Russia the capital of the republic of Bashkortostan in western Russia. In Ufa, Pfeiffer was Director of the Institute of Mathematics and Physics.

== Sources ==
- O'Connor, John J.; Robertson, Edmund F., "Georgy Pfeiffer", MacTutor History of Mathematics Archive, University of St Andrews
