= St George the Conqueror Chapel Mausoleum =

Landmark in Pleven, Bulgaria

Coordinates: 43°24′27″N 24°37′11″E

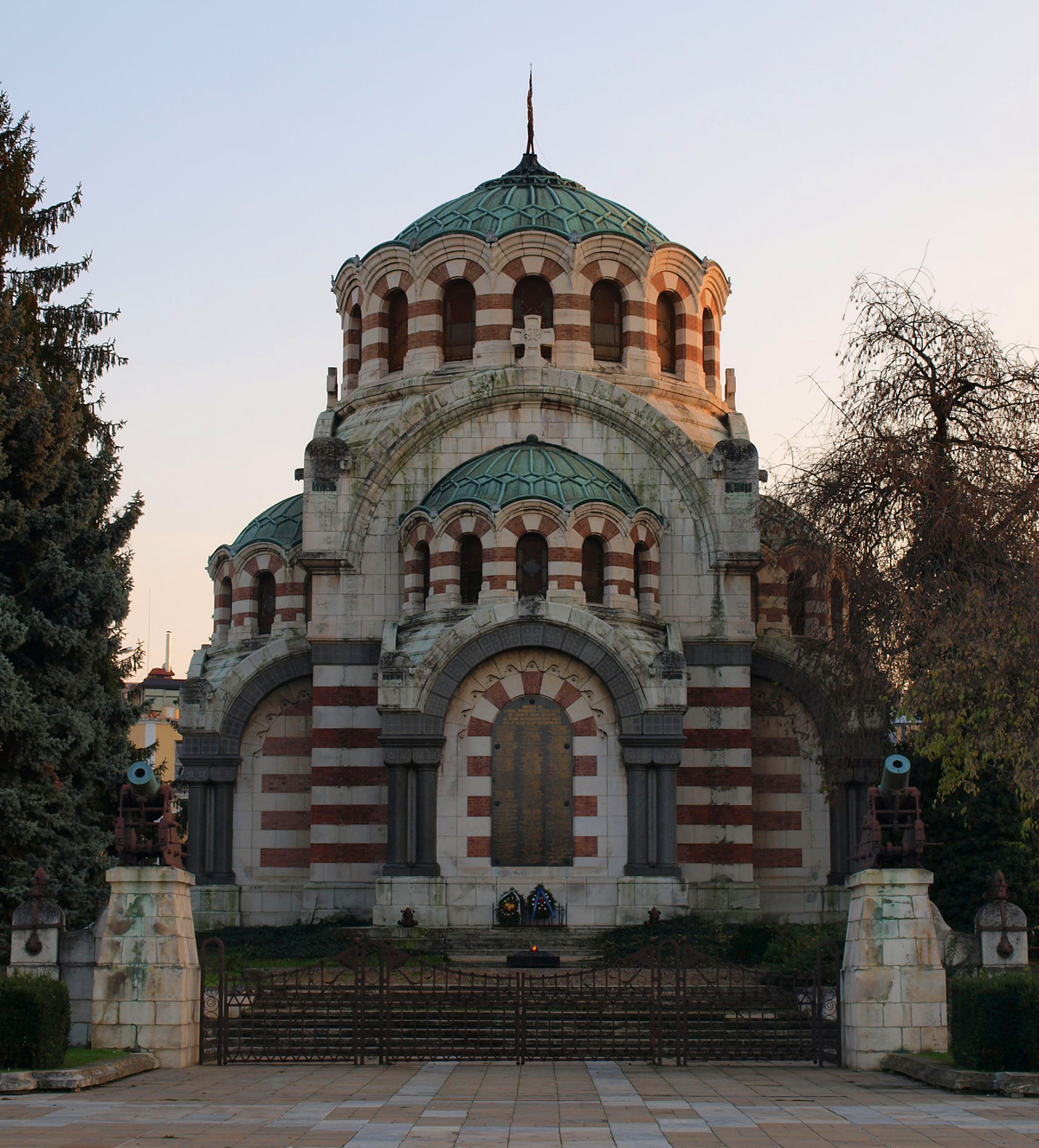
St George the Conqueror Chapel Mausoleum

The St George the Conqueror Chapel Mausoleum (Bulgarian: Параклис-мавзолей „Св. Георги Победоносец“, Paraklis-mavzoley „Sv. Georgi Pobedonosets“) is a mausoleum (ossuary) and memorial Bulgarian Orthodox chapel, as well as a major landmark of Pleven, Bulgaria.

Built between 1903 and 1907 in the Neo-Byzantine style by the architect Pencho Koychev, whose project won a contest in 1903, it is dedicated to the Russian and Romanian soldiers who fell for the Liberation of Bulgaria during the Siege of Plevna of 1877. The remains of many of these soldiers are preserved in the mausoleum. The icons in the chapel mausoleum are the work of Bulgarian artists.

The chapel mausoleum bears the name of Saint George, the patron saint of soldiers, and is also depicted in the coat of arms of Pleven. It lies on the main Vazrazhdane Square.
