= Georgy Girl (disambiguation) =

Georgy Girl is a 1966 British film based on a novel by Margaret Forster.

Georgy Girl or Georgie Girl may also refer to:

- "Georgy Girl" (song), the title song from the 1966 film, performed by The Seekers
- Georgy Girl, a 1965 novel by Margaret Forster
- Georgy Girl (musical), a 2015 jukebox musical about The Seekers
- Georgie Girl, a 2001 New Zealand film directed by Annie Goldson and Peter Wells

== See also ==
- Georgy (musical), a 1970 Broadway show based on the novel and film Georgy Girl
