= Georgi (surname) =

Georgi is a German surname.

Notable people with the surname include:

- Friedrich von Georgi (1852–1926), general of the Austro-Hungarian Army
- Howard Georgi (born 1947), American physicist
- Johann Gottlieb Georgi (1729–1802), German naturalist and geographer
- Pfeiffer Georgi (born 2000), British racing cyclist
- Susanne Georgi (born 1976), Danish singer
- Yvonne Georgi (1903–1975), German dancer, choreographer, and ballet mistress
