= George, Missouri =

Extinct town in the American state of Missouri

Coordinates: 38.2453288°N 90.9490265°W

George is an extinct town in Franklin County, in the U.S. state of Missouri.

A post office called George was established in 1894, and remained in operation until 1905. Stephen H. George, an early postmaster, gave the community his last name.
