= George (1802 ship) =

Australian sailboat (1802–1806)

History

Australia
- Name: George
- Owner: John Palmer, Sydney
- Builder: Hawkesbury River, New South Wales
- Launched: 1802
- Fate: Wrecked in 1806

General characteristics
- Class & type: Sloop
- Tons burthen: 28 (bm)

George was an Australian sloop launched in 1802 and wrecked in 1806. She spent her brief career seal hunting in Bass Strait.

George was a sloop of 28 tons that John Palmer of Sydney had built on the Hawkesbury River, New South Wales.

On 15 May 1803 George ran aground on New Year's Island on her way to Bass Strait. She was eventually refloated on 1 February 1804, although a carpenter drowned in the process.

In 1806, George, under the command of Thomas Birbeck, was carried onto rocks by a strong current in Twofold Bay in late January or early February. When George was refloated she was found to be so badly damaged that she was immediately beached. Aboriginals attacked the crew, throwing spears and burning grass at them. Birbeck and the crew opened fire and killed several Aboriginal people. The crew then set off for Sydney in the ship's boat and arrived there on 13 February 1806.

On 20 March 1806 Venus left Sydney to find the wreck and refloat it. However, on arrival it was discovered to be in such bad condition that the cargo of 5000 sealskins were removed and the ship set on fire to salvage the ironwork. Venus returned to Sydney leaving a party of five behind for no apparent reason. One of the men, Yankey Campbell, went missing on 20 April and was presumed to have been killed by Aboriginals. The remaining four fought a pitched battle with some Aboriginals and then took to their small boat. Bad weather forced them to land at Jervis Bay where they asked two Aboriginals to guide them to Sydney. They arrived in Sydney on 13 May 1806.
