= Belushi's =

British bar chain

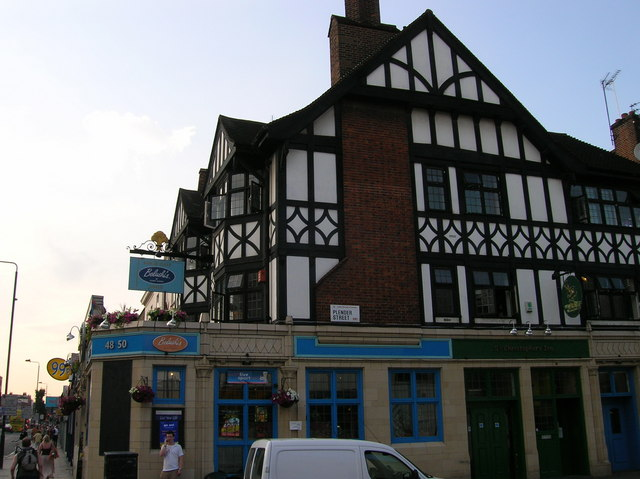
Belushi's in Camden, London

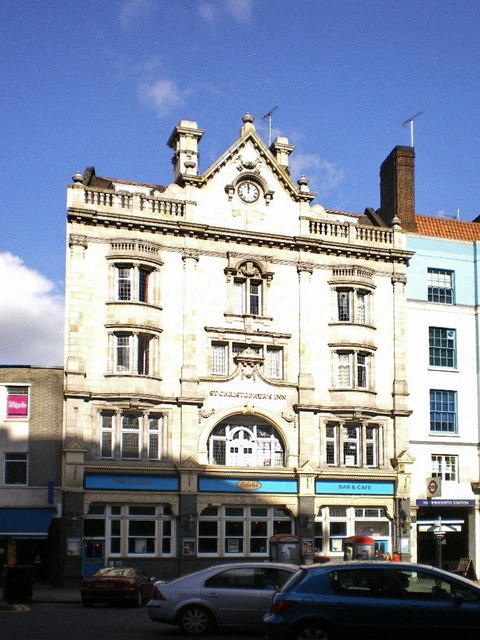
Belushi's in Hammersmith, London

Belushi's is a British bar chain.

In 1993, the first Belushi's bar was opened in London's Covent Garden. In 1995, the first St Christopher's Inn backpacker hostel opened in Southwark. By 1999, the parent company Beds and Bars had six backpacker bars and 350 beds in London.

As of 2014, Beds and Bars has bars and/or hostels in London, Newquay and Edinburgh in the UK; and Amsterdam, Bruges, Berlin and Paris elsewhere in Europe.
