= Georgii Cherkin =

Bulgarian musician

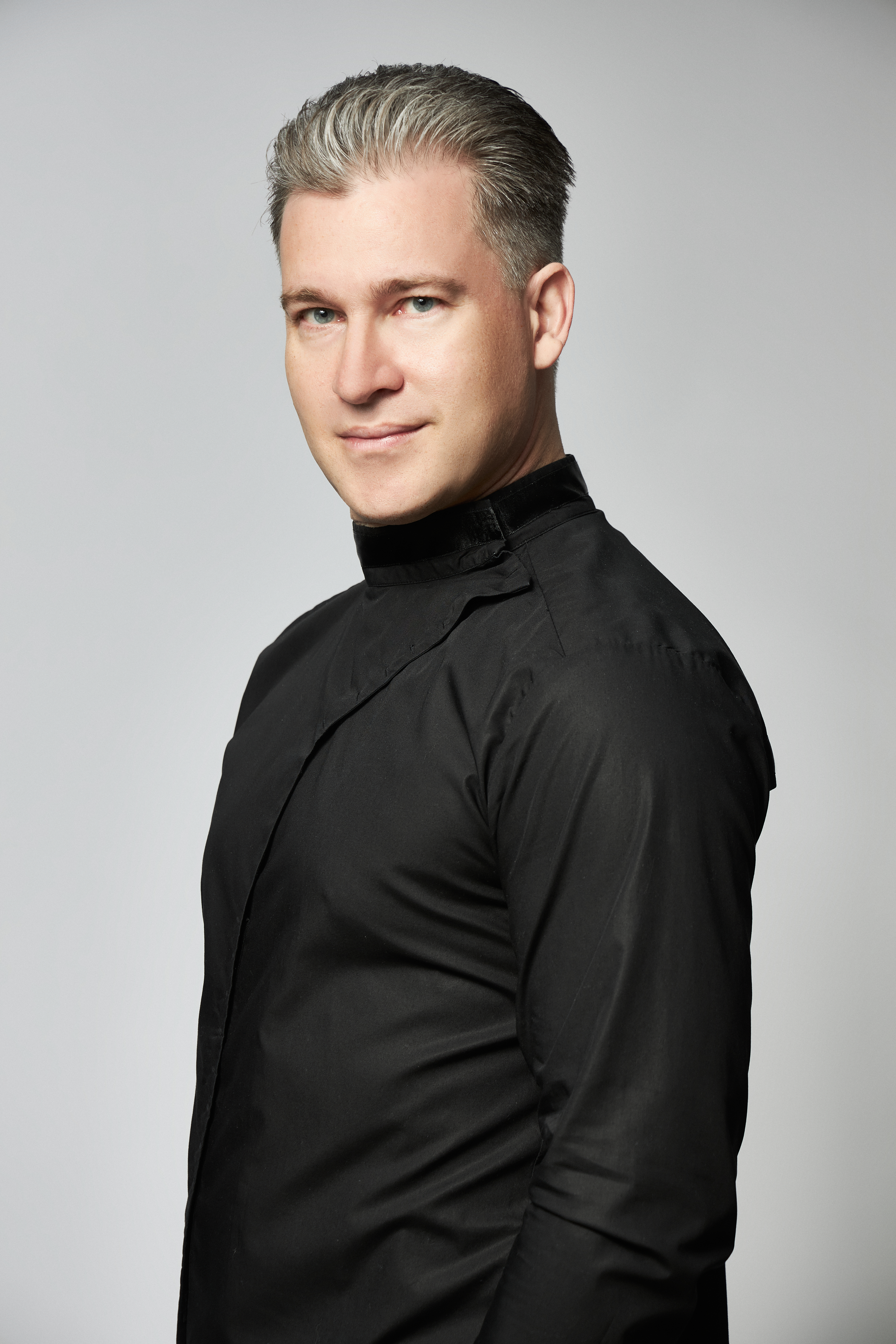
- Born: 2 July 1977 (age 49); Sofia, Bulgaria
- Occupations: Pianist, composer
- Known for: Renditions of Beethoven's notable works
- Website: https://georgiicherkin.com/

Georgii Cherkin is a Bulgarian pianist and composer.

== Career ==
He has performed as a soloist with symphony orchestras more than 100 times.
