= Georgy (given name) =

Georgy (/ɡiːɒrɡiː/; Russian: Георгий, romanized: Georgiy; Bulgarian: Георги, romanized: Georgi) is a Slavic masculine given name, derived from the Greek name Georgios. It corresponds to the English name George. The name Georgi is the most used masculine name in Bulgaria and the most given to new-born boys in the country, with the family name Georgiev/Georgieva also widely used. In Romanian the name is written as Gheorghe to signify the hard g sound. Russian derivations from Georgios include Yury and Yegor.

Notable people with the given name include:

- Georgy Adamovich (1892–1972), Russian poet
- Georgy Aleksandrov (1908–1961), Soviet politician
- Georgy Arbatov (1923–2010), Soviet and Russian political scientist
- Georgi Asparuhov (1943–1971), Bulgarian footballer
- Georgy Babakin (1914–1971), Soviet aerospace engineer
- Georgy Beregovoy (1921–1995), Soviet cosmonaut
- Georgiy Daneliya (1930–2019), Soviet and Russian film director
- Georgy Chicherin (1872–1936), Soviet politician
- Georgi Delchev (1872–1903), Bulgarian revolutionary
- Georgi Dimitrov (1882 – 1949), Bulgarian communist politician
- Georgy Egorychev (born 1938), Soviet and Russian mathematician
- Georgy Firtich (1938–2016), Soviet and Russian composer
- Georgy Flyorov (1913–1990), Soviet nuclear physicist
- Georgi Gospodinov, Bulgarian writer
- Georgi Ivanov (born 1940), Bulgarian cosmonaut
- Georgi Ivanov (born 1976), Bulgarian footballer
- Georgy Ketoyev (born 1985), Russian wrestler
- Georgi Klissurski (born 1991), Bulgarian politician
- Georgij Karlovich Kreyer (1887-1942), Russian botanist and mycologist
- Georgy Lvov (1861–1925), Russian politician and prime minister
- Georgy Malenkov (1902–1988), Russian politician
- Georgi Markov (1929–1978), Bulgarian dissident
- Georgy Millyar (1903–1993), Soviet actor
- Georgy Miterev (1900–1977), Soviet minister of health
- Georgy Mondzolevski (1934–2024), Soviet volleyball player
- Philaret Voznesensky (1903–1985), born Georgy Nikolayevich Voznesensky, First Hierarch of the Russian Orthodox Church Outside Russia
- Georgi Orlov (1884–1941), Russian-Estonian politician
- Georgi Parvanov (born 1957), President of Bulgaria from 2002 to 2012
- Georgi Petrov (badminton) (born 1980), Bulgarian badminton player
- Georgi Plekhanov (1856–1918), Russian revolutionary and Marxist theoretician
- Georgi Rakovski (1821—1867), Bulgarian revolutionary
- Georgy Satarov (born 1947), Russian political scientist
- Georgy Sedov (1877–1914), Russian explorer
- Georgi Shangin (born 1989), Russian ice hockey player
- Georgy Tovstonogov (1915–1989), Soviet theatre director
- Georgi Vazov (1860—1934), Bulgarian general and Minister of War
- Georgy Vitsin (1918–2001), Soviet and Russian actor
- Georgy Zhukov (1896–1974), Russian general

== See also ==
- Gheorghe
- Giorgi (name)
- Giorgio (name)
