= Georgie (disambiguation) =

Georgie is a unisex given name. It may also refer to:

- Georgie!, a 1982–84 manga series
- Georgie, a 2019 film based on the It miniseries
- Georgie Award or Entertainer of the Year Award, presented by the American Guild of Variety Artists
- Georgie, a 1944 children's picture book written and illustrated by Robert Bright
