= Without You I'm Nothing (Sandra Bernhard album) =

Live album by Sandra Bernhard
- Released: 1989, re-release 2004
- Recorded: 1988
- Genre: Comedy, pop
- Length: 88:42
- Label: Enigma Records
- Producer: Joe Chiccarelli, Sandra Bernhard and John Boskovich

Sandra Bernhard chronology
I'm Your Woman (1985)	Without You I'm Nothing (1989)	Excuses for Bad Behavior (1994)

Professional ratings
Review scores
Source	Rating
Christgau's Record Guide	B+

Without You I'm Nothing is the second record released by American actress, comedian, and singer Sandra Bernhard.

== History ==
The album is a live performance recording that was issued on double-cassette, compact disc and double-vinyl in 1989; it was later re-released on double-compact disc and made available for sale on Bernhard's own website. The re-release included a second disc of bonus material. Bernhard was nominated for a Grammy Award for Best Comedy Album in 1990.

== Material ==
The recording features a combination of live music performance and comedy. The recording contains material from Bernhard's one-woman show of the same name, whose motion picture adaptation would arrive in 1990.

Bernhard developed the show with Mitch Kaplan, her musical director, and John Boscovich who co-wrote and directed. In an interview, she was quoted as saying “Almost every night, we went out afterwards, dancing, or hung out on Second Avenue. There were a lot more people on the street. It was just a more accessible, affordable situation back then.”

== Track listing ==
1. "The Commitment"
2. "Childhood Reminiscences"
3. "White Christmas"
4. "Time of the Season"
5. "Me & Mrs. Jones"
6. "The Woman I Could Have Been"
7. "Mighty Real"
8. "The Women of Rock 'N' Roll"
9. "Ain't No Mountain High Enough"
10. "Apocalyptic White Trash"
11. "Finale: The Lion Sleeps Tonight"
12. "Encore: Little Red Corvette"

=== Bonus Tracks on Re-Release Disc 2 ===
1. "Undressed"
2. "Is That All There Is?"
3. ""Until the Real Thing Comes Along"
4. "Mighty Real" (Slow Remix)
5. "Mighty Real" (Special Remix)
6. "Mighty Real" (Her Remix)
7. "Mighty Real" (The Remix)
8. "Mighty Real" (Rapid Remix)

== Personnel ==
- Sandra Bernhard – lead singer & spoken-word
- Mitch Kaplan – acoustic piano
- Tori Amos – background vocals ("Little Red Corvette")
- Nancy Shanks - background vocals ("Little Red Corvette")
- Tim Landers – bass
- John S. Boskovich
