= Boskovich =

Boskovich is a surname. Notable people with the surname include:

- Alexander Uriah Boskovich (1907–1964), Israeli composer
- John S. Boskovich (1956–2006), American artist, writer, filmmaker, and teacher

And usernames like this one are commonly used in countries like: - Croatia - Russia

== See also ==
- Bošković
- Boskovich Farms
