= Unfinished Painting =

1989 unfinished work by Keith Haring

- Artist: Keith Haring
- Year: 1989
- Medium: Acrylic on canvas
- Dimensions: 100 cm × 100 cm (39 in × 39 in)
- Location: Private collection

Unfinished Painting is a 1989 painting by American artist Keith Haring. It is a 100 cm by 100 cm acrylic painting on canvas piece, recognizable by the large swath of canvas left exposed. It is known as one of Haring's final paintings before his 1990 death from AIDS-related complications at the age of 31. From April 27 to September 8, 2024, the piece was on tour with the "Keith Haring: Art Is for Everybody" exhibit at the Walker Art Center.

== Composition ==
This painting is a largely blank canvas, except for the upper left corner which is painted in purple with black and white lines. The figures and designs in this corner follow Haring's distinctive art style. This portion of the painting includes rounded 'doodles' including those of the human form. A complete human figure is seen just below the geometric frame of the top left corner. Two other incomplete human figures appear to either side, each lacking a head with their necks flowing into other lines of the painting. The central figure is seen in a 'dancing' pose while the two incomplete figures stand on their hands; each of these body positions is indicative of Haring's art style.

This design is interrupted by a jagged edge and uncharacteristic drips across the blank canvas below. These purple streaks are smudged and distributed in an apparently random arrangement across the bottom of the completed portion of the painting. The blank canvas constitutes roughly 3/4 of this painting.

== Ideology and activism ==
This painting was purposefully left unfinished by Haring to represent his life being cut short by AIDS. It has sometimes been described as a self-portrait, with the incomplete nature of the piece representing Haring's unfinished career and the art he would not be able to create. This painting has also been described as a statement on the AIDS epidemic's destruction of the gay community and culture, with the sudden shift into blank canvas indicating the sudden onset of the pandemic.

Haring was notably outspoken about the AIDS epidemic in his life and artwork. In a 1989 interview with Rolling Stone, Haring discussed living with HIV/AIDS, thus becoming part of a very small collection of celebrities discussing the epidemic at the time. Much of Haring's work advocated for safe sex and for a greater government response to the AIDS epidemic. Haring was a proponent of ACT UP, a political group working to end the AIDS epidemic, and was known to have donated tens of thousands of dollars to the cause.

Haring was also known for his increased artistic production from the time of his diagnosis to his death. His art became further focused on sexual safety and AIDS awareness during this time. He used the slogan SILENCE = DEATH in many of his later works including Silence = Death (1989) and Ignorance = Fear / Silence = Death (1989).

Haring's artworks were completed in a variety of mediums, including but not limited to graffiti, lithography, and acrylic on vinyl. Haring was dedicated to creating art accessible to all viewers, declaring in a manifesto "The public has a right to art/The public is being ignored by most contemporary artists/Art is for everybody." Some have posited that Unfinished Painting was completed on canvas to give the piece an element of formality, distinguishing it from his other works.

== Reception ==
Haring's directness about the AIDS epidemic was met with mixed public response. Though he was applauded by some, he was also shunned in some "celebrity" social circles. Unfinished Painting was praised as an exemplary art piece of the epidemic as early as 1992, only 3 years after its composition, and has often been discussed and exhibited with pieces such as "Untitled" (Portrait of Ross in L.A.) and the works of Robert Mapplethorpe.

The painting was on display with "Hide/Seek: Difference and Desire in American Portraiture" at the National Portrait Gallery, Smithsonian Institution, from October 30 through February 13, 2011. This exhibit was the first exhibition on gender and sexuality in modern portraiture in a major gallery.

External image
- An AI-generated version to complete the exact painting

In 2023, the painting gained additional public notice when a Twitter user used an artificial intelligence (AI) software to "complete" the unfinished painting. The tweet went viral and sparked widespread discussion on the use of AI in art and on the original intent and statement of the artist. Many found the action to be disrespectful, both in that the "completion" ignored Haring's artistic autonomy and that it changed the aspect of the painting which stood as a memorial to those who died to the AIDS epidemic. Along with ethical concerns regarding the use of AI in art, users also pointed to the difference in composition between the original artwork and the AI "completion". Where the original artwork featured intricate designs including that of the human body in the upper-left corner, the AI-generated portion consisted of random zigzags, imitating the appearance but not the content of the original painting.
