= I'm Your Woman =

I'm Your Woman may refer to:

- I'm Your Woman (album), a 1985 album by Sandra Bernhard
- I'm Your Woman (film), a 2020 drama film directed by Julia Hart
- "I'm Your Woman" (song), a 1973 single by Jeanne Pruett
- "I Am Your Woman", a 2001 single by Syleena Johnson
