= Mitchell Kaplan =

American musician and bandleader

- Genres: Pop; rock; R&B; jazz
- Occupations: Music director; musician; composer; arranger; producer
- Instrument: Keyboards

Mitchell Kaplan is an American musician, music director, songwriter, arranger and producer. He is best known as the Music Director for Sandra Bernhard and for alternative comedy company Un-cabaret. He has been featured as musical director in performances with Ana Gasteyer and Cady Huffman.

== Career ==
Kaplan began his career as a pianist and songwriter, writing songs for artists including Chaka Khan, Thelma Houston, Sister Sledge and Martika.

Kaplan has been the musical director for Sandra Bernhard since 1985.

He collaborated with Sofia Shinas on her self-titled 1992 Warner Bros album release as composer, mixer, and producer. He produced and co-wrote One Last Kiss.

Kaplan appeared in TV shows including Will & Grace, Roseanne, and The Tonight Show.

== Work with Sandra Bernhard ==
During the '80's "ball era", Kaplan met Sandra Bernhard. At the Beverly Theater in 1986 Kaplan accompanied Bernhard on keyboard and synthesizer on seven songs.

He collaborated with Bernhard on her Excuses for Bad Behavior, Pt. 1, her one-woman show "I'm Still Here...Damn It!" which was released as a live recording, as announcer, composer, keyboards, producer, and her Without You I'm Nothing. He produced and co-wrote You Make Me Feel (Mighty Real) for Excuses for Bad Behaviour Pt. 1.

Kaplan was the musical director for The Sandra Bernhard Experience.

Kaplan wrote Miracle of Lights with Sandra Bernhard.

== UnCabaret and work with Beth Lapides ==
Kaplan met Beth Lapides while Lapides was writing 100% Happy 88% of the Time.

They began working together and added music to the show. They were offered a room to play in downtown LA near First and Hope Streets. Kaplan suggested UnCabaret. They added music and put on their first UnCabaret show together.

Kaplan and Lapides celebrated the 25th Anniversary of UnCabaret on November 18, 2018, at the Theatre at Ace Hotel, under the auspices of CAP/UCLA.

Uncabaret continued during the pandemic as a live-stream comedy show on zoom.
