= Electric Fan (Feel It Motherfuckers) =

American piece of art

Electric Fan (Feel It Motherfuckers): Only Unclaimed Item from the Stephen Earabino Estate
- Artist: John S. Boskovich
- Year: 1997
- Catalogue: 2000.12
- Medium: Electric fan in poly(methyl methacrylate)
- Location: Museum of Contemporary Art, Los Angeles

Electric Fan (Feel It Motherfuckers): Only Unclaimed Item from the Stephen Earabino Estate is a 1997 work of art by John S. Boskovich. The piece consists of a functioning electric box fan, the only possession Boskovich was able to keep that belonged to his partner, Stephen Earabino, following his death in 1995.

== Context ==
Boskovich (1956–2006) studied at the California Institute of the Arts under the tutelage of conceptual artist John Baldessari. His work has been cited as drawing heavily from Dadaism, and frequently utilised objects, photography, handwritten and typeset texts and audio sources to create "witty and sharp-edged social commentary". Boskovich was in a relationship with Stephen Earabino, a fashion stylist originally from Massachusetts, with whom he lived in an apartment in Los Angeles, California. In 1995, Earabino died from AIDS-related complications. Shortly after his death, Earabino's family emptied out the apartment Earabino shared with Boskovich, removing all of his items, as well as most of Boskovich's, with the only remaining item being an electric box fan.

== Description ==
Electric Fan (Feel It Motherfuckers) consists of a working electric box fan that had previously belonged to Boskovich and Earabino. The fan is enclosed in Plexiglas with a faux vinyl etching reading "Only unclaimed item from the Stephen Earabino estate". There are multiple circular cut-outs in the Plexiglas, which allows air from the fan to escape.

== Analysis and interpretations ==
Electric Fan (Feel It Motherfuckers) has been called "one of Boskovich's most tragic works", although Andrew Berardini in Artforum noted that the inclusion of holes in the Plexiglas to allow air to flow from the fan ultimately made it "more protective than funereal".

The piece has been interpreted as representing Boskovich's grief at the loss of his partner, as well as more generally the grief experienced during the AIDS epidemic. Nilo Goldfarb in X-TRA commented on the titular "feel it", suggesting it had a dual meaning of both the comfort Earabino received from the fan when he was dying, and also the grief that Boskovich felt following his death. The air coming from Electric Fan has been described as representing Earabino's breathing, with it being suggested that it Boskovich had made "a tender as well as broken-hearted gesture towards some sort of eternal life" for Earabino.

José Fernández Martínez in Historia Arte noted the context of the AIDS epidemic that claimed the life of Earabino as well as many others of Boskovich's friends and acquaintances during the 1980s and 1990s. The families of some victims did not want to publicly acknowledge their queer identities or that they died from AIDS-related complications, with Earabino's family's removal of his items being described as symbolic of attempts to eradicate the memories, existences, and relationships of many queer people who died. They saw Boskovich as challenging this by preserving and commemorating the only physical part of his life with Earabino that remained following his death.

Electric Fan (Feel It Motherfuckers) has been compared to similar works by Boskovich's contemporary, Félix González-Torres, who made several works of arts that have been interpreted as commemorating his partner, Ross Laycock, who, like Earabino, died of AIDS-related complications in 1991.

== Display ==
Boskovich did not display much of his art during his lifetime, though he did donate Electric Fan (Feel It Motherfuckers), alongside several other items, to the Museum of Contemporary Art, Los Angeles, in memory of Earabino.

Between September 2019 and January 2020, the piece was displayed as part of Psycho Salon, an exhibition of Boskovich's art and possessions, at the O-Town House in Los Angeles.

== See also ==
- "Untitled" (Portrait of Ross in L.A.)
