= David Lewis Gallery =

Coordinates: 40°43′8″N 74°0′12″W

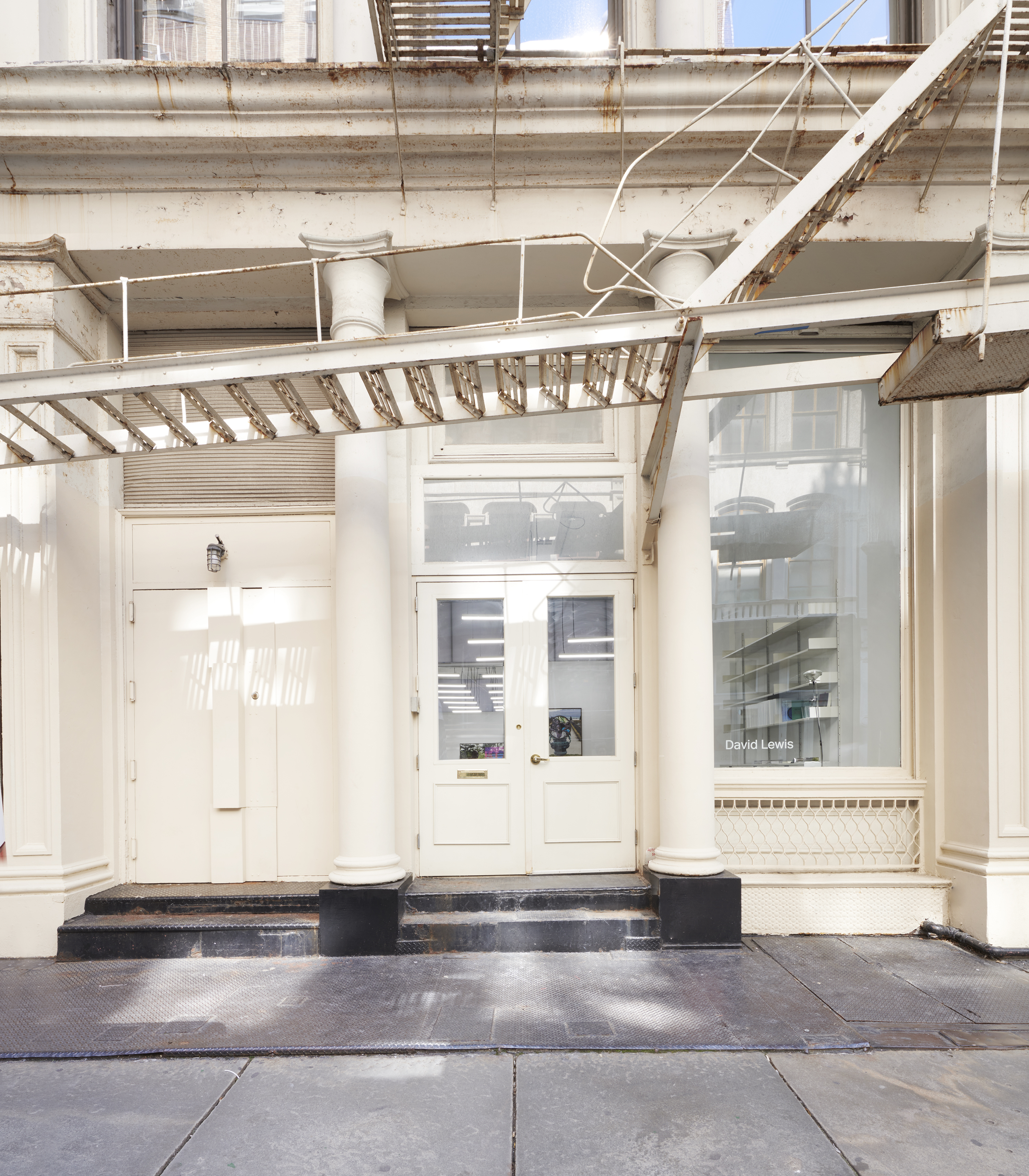
Front entrance of David Lewis Gallery in Tribeca (2023)

David Lewis was a contemporary art gallery in New York founded by art historian David Lewis in 2013. The gallery was known for representation and championing prominent international artists such as Barbara Bloom and the estates of Thornton Dial, John Boskovich and Mary Beth Edelson.

== History ==
=== Emergence in Paris, France ===
Before opening the gallery, the gallery's founder worked in New York City and Paris as an art critic, contributing regularly to international art magazines such as Artforum and Frieze. Lewis was also a professor and completed a Ph.D. examining the career of Francis Picabia. His academic background directly informs the programming of artists and artistry at the gallery, which, makes art-historical arguments on behalf of its represented emerging and established artists. During this time, Lewis published extensively, including essays on Guston, Sturtevant, and Matisse and he continued to publish after the gallery opened, including a review of the MoMA Picabia exhibition for Artforum and an essay on the history of cinema for Chrissie Iles's Dreamlands exhibition at the Whitney.

=== Eldridge Street in New York ===
From 2013 to 2020, David Lewis gallery was located on the fifth floor of 88 Eldridge Street. The gallery served as a central location for a group of emerging artists. For some of these artists, like Thornton Dial, the gallery built a critical and commercial legacy for them, who, despite the artists achievements that would lead to broad institutional acclaim. Beginning with the Philip K. Dick inspired A Scanner, Darkly, the gallery ethos articulated a distinct pattern of experimental voices and exhibitions, including Lucy Dodd whose institutional exhibition included the Whitney Museum's 2016, Open Plan, and Dawn Kasper, whose Nomadic Studio Practice culminated at the Sala Chini at the 2017 Venice Biennale.

In the following years, the gallery began representing historically established artists such as Barbara Bloom and the estates of Thornton Dial, John Boskovich and Mary Beth Edelson. Some of these artists, like Thornton Dial, the gallery built a critical and commercial legacy for them who, despite the artists' achievements, had previously been excluded from art history and the art market. David Lewis successfully created a reception and a market for Thornton Dial in the contemporary art world (rather than as an 'outsider' or 'self-taught'), changing Thornton Dial's place in the canon of contemporary art. David Lewis was the first to garner Thornton Dial reviews by significant contemporary critics such as Roberta Smith, the first to exhibit Thornton Dial at contemporary art fairs, the first to bring Thornton Dial to Art Basel and to Europe.

=== Tribeca ===
In September 2021, David Lewis relocated to 57 Walker Street in Tribeca, opening with an exhibition of Todd Gray. The gallery's programming continues to focus on both historical and contemporary art, with Thornton Dial, in conversation with David Hammons and Robert Rauschenberg in 'Dial / Hammons / Rauschenberg', Claire Lehmann's debut solo exhibition, and Peter Schlesinger.

The gallery also opened a second location in East Hampton, exhibiting Thornton Dial, Barbara Bloom, Tomás Esson, Todd Gray, and Peter Schelsinger in its first season.

In May 2024, the gallery announced it would close after a decade in operation. Its last show was called, "Everyone Loves Picabia," a nod to the painter and writer Francis Picabia's love for composing with circles. The gallery joins a list of important contemporary art galleries in Manhattan closing its doors in 2024, including Washburn Gallery and Marlborough Gallery, as well as several younger enterprises—including Foxy Production, Queer Thoughts, and JTT.
