= Without You I'm Nothing (film) =

1990 film directed by John S. Boskovich

- Directed by: John Boskovich
- Screenplay by: Sandra Bernhard; John Boskovich
- Based on: Without You, I'm Nothing; 1988 play by Sandra Bernhard
- Produced by: Jonathan D. Krane
- Starring: Sandra Bernhard
- Cinematography: Joseph Yacoe
- Edited by: Pamela Malouf-Cundy
- Music by: Patrice Rushen
- Production company: M.C.E.G.
- Distributed by: New Line Cinema
- Release dates: May 4, 1990 (New York City); May 11, 1990 (United States)
- Running time: 90 minutes
- Country: United States
- Language: English

Without You I'm Nothing is a 1990 American musical comedy film directed by John Boskovich and starring and written by comedian and singer Sandra Bernhard, based on material from her award-winning one-woman show of the same name, which was produced by Terry Danuser.

The film was shot on location in August 1989 at The Coconut Grove in the Ambassador Hotel in Los Angeles. Karole Armitage was the choreographer. The film recreates moments from the stage show, often with Bernhard dressed in zany costumes reminiscent of the character she is embodying without actually "becoming" that character. Interspersed are faux-interview bits with actress Lu Leonard as Bernhard's manager and actor Steve Antin, with whom she would later co-star in the film Inside Monkey Zetterland. A Madonna impersonator Denise Bella Vlasis played a direct reference to Sandra's friendship with Madonna as character Shoshanna.

The film is notorious for a finale in which Bernhard wears nothing but pasties and an extremely skimpy G-string (in an American Flag print) and proceeds to go-go dance to the song "Little Red Corvette" by Prince. It was not a commercial success, but it was highly praised by critics for its caustic commentary on American values and celebrity culture.

In Bernhard's 2006 Off-Broadway show Everything Bad & Beautiful, she concludes by showing the final footage from this film: Cynthia Bailey writing "Fuck Sandra Bernhard" on a tablecloth in lipstick.

== Cast ==
- Sandra Bernhard as Herself
- John Doe as Himself
- Steve Antin as Himself
- Lu Leonard as Ingrid Horn, Sandra's Manager
- Ken Foree as Emcee
- Cynthia Bailey as Roxanne
- Paul Michael Thorpe as Apollo (credited as Paul Thorpe)
- Denise Vlasis as Shoshanna
- Djimon Hounsou as Ex-Boyfriend (credited as Djimon Hounson)
- Stephanie Albers as Hippie Girl
- Robin Antin as Hippie Girl
- Annie Livingstone as Hippie Girl

== Home media ==
Without You I'm Nothing was released on VHS video cassette on December 19, 1990, and became a cult classic, prompting it to be re-released (again on VHS) in 2000 as part of the "MGM Avant-Garde Cinema" collection. It was released on DVD on August 23, 2005.

== Reception ==
In 1997's Performance Anxieties, sociologist Ann Pellegrini discussed a scene in which Bernhard's character "appropriates signifiers of blackness throughout her performance to an all-black audience". Bernhard has stated that " the film is an attempt to mock a character who is appropriating blackness". In 2009, the York University sociologist Tara Atluri compared Bernhard's character with the Sacha Baron Cohen character Ali G, as both may be interpreted as mocking whites who adopt Black fashion and characteristics.

== See also ==
- Representation of African Americans in media
