= Sofia Shinas =

Canadian musician and actress

- Born: January 17, 1968 (age 58); Windsor, Ontario, Canada
- Genres: Pop; Dance
- Occupations: Singer-songwriter, actress, director
- Years active: 1991–present
- Label: Warner (1992)

Sofia Shinas (born January 17, 1968) is a Canadian singer, songwriter, actress and director.

Shinas entered the entertainment industry as a recording artist and later pursued acting. After graduating from film school, she became a film director. She is best known for her role as Eric Draven's murdered fiancée, Shelly, in The Crow, in which she starred opposite Brandon Lee.

== Early life ==
Shinas was born in Windsor, Ontario, to Greek parents. She briefly attended the University of Toronto, but dropped out before finishing her first semester in order to pursue creating music in New York City.

== Career ==
=== Recording artist ===
In 1992, Shinas released her eponymously titled debut album on Warner Bros. Records. She co-wrote every song and worked with various producers and remixers, including Steve Peck, Daniel Abraham (record producer), Mitch Kaplan, Mark 'MK' Kinchen, Roger Sanchez, Tommy Musto, Ben Grosse and Boris Granich.

Her first single, "The Message", reached No. 20 on Billboard's Dance/Club Play chart and was a crossover pop hit, peaking at No. 75 on the Hot 100 chart. Her second single, "One Last Kiss", didn't chart in the US, but became a minor hit in her native Canada. Her last single, "State of Mind", peaked at No. 16 on the Dance/Club Play chart. She received a Juno Award nomination for Most Promising Female Vocalist at the Juno Awards of 1993.

Shinas left the music business to pursue a career as actor and director. She has not released another album.

=== Film actress ===
Shinas made her film debut in the 1994 action thriller The Crow, starring Brandon Lee. The box office hit has become a cult favorite. Shinas then landed a role opposite Charlie Sheen and Nastassja Kinski in Terminal Velocity.

She starred alongside C. Thomas Howell in the independent action/drama, Hourglass and in the 1997 action film, Dilemma.

=== Television actress ===
Shinas appeared in two episodes of the TV series The Outer Limits (in the "Valerie 23" and "Mary 25" episodes) and an episode of The Hunger.

=== Film director ===
Shinas's first feature as director is the thriller, My Stepdaughter, released in August 2015.

== Education ==
In 2008, Shinas graduated from the USC School of Cinema-Television in Los Angeles, California where she directed a film titled Spring Eternal as a thesis project.

== Filmography ==
Film
Year	Film	Role	Notes
1994	The Crow	Shelly Webster	
1994	Terminal Velocity	Maxine 'Broken Legs Max'	
1995	Hourglass	Dara Jensen	
1996	Ripper Man	Gena	
1996	Dilemma	Lydia Cantrell	
1997	Hostile Intent	Gina	Alternative title: Lethal Games
2000	Red Shoe Diaries 12: Girl on a Bike	Woman on Train	Segment: "Borders of Salt"
2004	Planet of the Pitts	Fay Kennedy, NBC News Anchor	
2015	My Stepdaughter		Directorial debut
2016	DaZe: Vol. Too (sic) – NonSeNse	Rosabel	
2021	Politically Homeless		Screenplay; director
Television
Year	Title	Role	Notes
1994	Red Shoe Diaries	Woman on Train	1 episode
1994	Blue Skies	Gina	1 episode
1998	The Hunger	Claire	1 episode
1995–1998	The Outer Limits	Mary 25 / Valerie 23	2 episodes
2020	Toasted		Sitcom; director

== Discography ==
=== Albums ===
- 1992: Sofia Shinas

=== Singles ===
- 1992: "The Message"
- 1992: "One Last Kiss"
- 1992: "State of Mind (You Make Me Feel Good)"
