= I'm Still Here... Damn It! =

Live album CD by Sandra Bernhard
- Released: 1998
- Recorded: 1998
- Genre: Comedy, pop
- Label: TVT Records
- Producer: Sandra Bernhard

Sandra Bernhard chronology
Excuses for Bad Behavior (Part One) (1991)	I'm Still Here... Damn It! (1998)	The Love Machine (2001)

I'm Still Here... Damn It! is an album released by singer/comedian/actress Sandra Bernhard. The album is a live recording of her one-woman show of the same title.

== Live show ==
In Bernhard's live performances she satirized celebrity culture while commenting on events of the time. Among the topics she addresses: the death of Diana, Princess of Wales, Mariah Carey, Courtney Love, modern technology, religion, the world of high fashion and relationships.

In 1997 the show ran at the Westbeth Theater Center in Greenwich Village, and also in 1998 at the Booth Theater in New York.

== Recording ==
The CD combines comedic monologues and musical performances taken from the live show. The final track, "On the Runway Remix", is a studio-produced track, produced by Eve Nelson that recreates the live performance of the track by the same name; the remix peaked at number 39 on Billboard’s Dance Club Songs Chart in April 1999. Nelson also produced "Perfection" on Sandra Bernhard's 2008 album "Everything Bad & Beautiful".

== Track listing ==
1. Walk Tall
2. Difficult Times
3. On The Runway
4. Telephones
5. Too Many Magazines
6. Courtney Love
7. The Beautiful Women In Hollywood
8. Peanuts
9. Lilith Fair
10. Nightingale
11. Designer Culture
12. Romance & Drugs
13. Mama's Getting Hot
14. Jazzy Spider
15. Fabulous Trip To Morocco/God Is Good
16. Sandy's Taxi
17. Hermino Is My House Painter
18. "That's My L.A."
19. Midnight Train To Georgia
20. On The Runway (Remix)

== DVD + VHS ==
The DVD for I'm Still Here... Damn It! was released on February 22, 2000. The DVD is Unrated and contains the following single bonus feature:

- 30 minutes of footage not seen in the broadcast version.

The DVD is directed by Marty Callner.

The Unrated VHS was also released. But it does not contain the bonus footage.
