= John S. Boskovich =

American film director, artist and writer (1956–2006)

John S. Boskovich (December 8, 1956 – September 24, 2006) was an artist, writer, filmmaker, and teacher. He is most known for his found art and installation work, his most notable piece being Electric Fan (Feel It Motherfuckers).

== Early life ==
Boskovich was the only child of John Boskovich Sr. and Marcella Boskovich (née Montagna). Boskovich is the grandson of Stephan Boskovich, founder of Boskovich Farms. Boskovich was raised in the San Fernando Valley and attended Notre Dame High School.

Boskovich received an undergraduate degree from USC, and went on to earn an MFA from the California Institute of the Arts. At CalArts, he was a student of John Baldessari, a conceptual artist who became his mentor. While attending CalArts, Boskovich simultaneously earned a law degree at Loyola Law School, although he never practiced law.

== Career ==
In the late 1980s Boskovich co-wrote and directed Without You I'm Nothing, a one-woman off-Broadway show starring actress and comedian Sandra Bernhard. He also directed the subsequent 1990 film version. He later went on to direct North, a 2001 film which featured artist and writer Gary Indiana reading from Louis-Ferdinand Céline's novel of the same name.

As an artist, Boskovich was indebted to the Dadaists, and used found objects, photography, handwritten and typeset texts, as well as audio sources to create witty, sharp-edged, social commentary. From 1988 to 1999, Boskovich exhibited at the Rosamund Felsen Gallery, now in Bergamot Station in Santa Monica, CA.

A 1994 show entitled "Rude Awakening" was inspired by his friendship and work with the band Rude Awakening, which included one of his friends, bassist Robert Calkin (a.k.a. Robert Ryder). The band's logo was included in many of his works. He also did the photography for their Headbutter E.P. using a technique he originated that incorporated video, television, and Polaroid cameras. He continued to use this photographic technique, with the addition of textual elements, in his mid-1990s "It" series.

A later project involved the transformation of his living space into an environmental artwork, often through architectural interventions or the incorporation of his older pieces into the space. In the mid-1990s, Boskovich taught at Otis College of Art and Design in Los Angeles. He curated several shows of his students' works at Rosamund Felsen.

Boskovich died at his home on September 24, 2006, aged 49, from undisclosed causes.

Boskovich's estate is represented by the David Lewis Gallery in New York. Two solo exhibitions have been exhibited at the gallery, John Boskovich from March 6, 2020—April 19, 2020 which reassembled his former West Hollywood home, “a highly fetishized design concept,” and John Boskovich: Mirrors from March 4, 2022—April 16, 2022.
