= Dawn Kasper =

American performance artist (born 1977)

- Born: 1977 (age 47–48); Fairfax, Virginia

Dawn Kasper (born 1977 in Fairfax, Virginia) is a New York-based interdisciplinary artist working across genres of performance, installation, sculpture, drawing, photography, video, and sound. Her often improvisational work derives from a "fascination with existentialism, subjects of vulnerability, desire, and the construction of meaning." Kasper uses props, costume, comedy, gesture, repetition, music, and monologue to create what she refers to as "living sculptures."

In 2017, the artist participated in the 57th Venice Biennale with a six-month durational performance in which she lived and worked in a public, itinerant "studio" space. The piece, entitled The Sun, The Moon, and The Stars (2017), was an installment of her ongoing "Nomadic Studio Practice" series, and consisted of various art supplies, work tables, drumsets, loudspeakers, and furniture. Kasper considered herself "in-residence," and made herself available to audiences for 'studio visits.' Writing in the catalogue for the Biennale, Marie Sarré notes: “The fusion between art and life and the desire to sunder ‘the fourth wall’ are at the heart of her pursuit. Her public scarification testifies to this.”

== Education ==
Kasper received a BFA in sculpture from Virginia Commonwealth University in 1999 and was accepted into graduate school at the University of California, Los Angeles immediately after. She received a MFA in New Genres in 2003. While at UCLA, Kasper studied under Chris Burden, Paul McCarthy, Pipilotti Rist, Catherine Opie, John Baldessari and Jason Rhoades. For three years following her graduation, the artist was represented by Anna Helwing Gallery in Los Angeles. She was then picked up by Circus Gallery where she opened her first solo show, titled Life and Death and guest curated by Rosanna Albertini, in 2007.

== Work ==
=== Early work ===
Following Chris Burden, Paul McCarthy, Mike Kelley, Gina Pane, Marina Abramović, and Jason Rhoades, Kasper's early work explored themes of "absence, death, and uncertainty," and reminded audiences "that art should never be safe."

In 2001, Dawn Kasper received a Fellowship from the Virginia Museum of Fine Arts in Richmond, Virginia for her graduate work in sculpture. The jurors who viewed and selected her work for the $6,000 Fellowship were Miles Chappell, Chancellor Professor of Art History, at the College of William & Mary in Williamsburg, Virginia; Jill Hartz from the Bayly Art Museum in Charlottesville, Virginia; Bernard Martin, professional artist from Richmond, Virginia; and Gayle Paul from Portsmouth Museums in Portsmouth, Virginia.

From 2001 to 2007 Dawn Kasper staged a series of live performances titled "The Evil Series" or "Death Scenes." For this series Kasper assumed a performative rigor mortis with a mise-en-scène reminiscent of B horror films and Weegee-eqsue crime scene photography. As Rachel Mason describes: "For years, Dawn could be spotted, dead, at art events all over Los Angeles, in the tradition of Harold and Maude, sprawled out in an elaborate shrine to some horrific accident."

=== The Nomadic Studio Practice ===
In 2008, when she could no longer afford rent for her studio, Kasper began a body of work entitled "The Nomadic Studio Practice." For this series Kasper constructs roving, improvisational "studios" within ongoing public exhibitions. "This makes the artist especially available," writes Sarah Lehrer-Graiwer, "which is important because she wants to be able to look and to be looked at, flesh-to-flesh, eye-to-eye: direct address and intersubjective transmission are paramount.”

==== "This Could be Something if I Let It" for the 2012 Whitney Biennial ====
Kasper participated in the 2012 Whitney Biennial with "This Could be Something if I Let It," a continuation of this body of work, in which she lived and worked in the gallery space as a "nomadic studio." Every day for the duration of the exhibit (three months), Kasper held ad hoc studio visits, made work, and interacted with the public, wearing away the difference between public and private, artist and visitor.

==== “The Sun, The Moon, and The Stars" for the 57th Venice Biennale ====
In 2017, extending her performance at the 2012 Whitney Biennial, Kasper participated in the 57th Venice Biennale, Viva Arte Viva, curated by Christine Macel, with a six-month durational performative installation in the Central Pavilion entitled “The Sun, The Moon, and The Stars." The interdisciplinary piece––again comprising a public, itinerant studio space––culminates Kasper's work over the previous decade. Each of Kasper's performances registers the artist's state of mind during a particular moment in her life. This approach recalls Allan Kaprow’s "life like" art, or "art emptied of everything except ourselves – who became art by default." On the Biennale's opening day, Kasper played Bessie Smith’s “Empty Bed Blues” throughout the gallery on her record player.

=== Elemental and word pieces ===
For her 2014 solo exhibition & sun & or THE SHAPE OF TIME at David Lewis, New York, Kasper presented "elements" activated by performance, evoking “the presence of a shaman with great powers, someone able to tap into something deep, maybe dark, and to be watched carefully.” The show was divided into five elemental "stations" in which a hazmat-suited Kasper intermittently performed: Fire, represented by "a tangle of tape and record players, mixers, a laptop, and percussion instruments "; Aether, by stacked tubs of Wiffle balls; Earth, by a lawnmower; Air, by a wooden table; and Water, by a yellow dresser containing photos, papers, and clothing.

=== Clusters and musical sculptures ===
Kasper incorporates musical instruments both musically and formally into her sculptures, casting both the instrument and its function as the subject of her work. Her "clusters" and other sonic sculptural installations both create and evoke sound.

In 2016 the artist had her second solo show at David Lewis Gallery in New York City. The exhibition, Cluster, included 63 cymbals arranged in groups throughout the gallery, all wired to electronic devices that sensed visitors’ movements and played the instruments in response. Grouped together according to star-map diagrams, the cymbals were "activated" by visitors circumambulating the mechanical orchestra. The piece was inspired by the "chirping sounds" made by audible conversions of the gravitational waves produced by colliding black holes. In this exhibition the viewer becomes the performer as he or she navigates the forest-like installation.

=== Individual musical works ===
In 2010 Kasper created Music for Hoarders, originally performed at Honor Fraser Gallery. She describes the piece as "a 'visual poem' performance action in which I collaborate with a group of musicians to create a structured experimental music composition to invoke the feeling of hoarding human emotions." The artist recreated the work in 2012 at the Armory Center for the Arts in Pasadena.

As part of ISSUE Project Room's 2015 Artist-In-Residence Program, Kasper performed Music For Matter: ENERGY INTO MATTER, consisting of improvisationally layered archival field recordings, drums, bells, and prerecorded analog sound. The composition was in part inspired by the ancient philosophical concept musica universalis, or Music of the Spheres, which regards the movement of celestial bodies as a form of musical harmony.

Kasper often collaborates with other artists and performers such as Lucy Dodd and Liz Glynn.

== Exhibitions ==
=== Solo shows ===
Kasper's work has been exhibited at the 57th Venice Biennale, Venice, Italy (2017); Converso, Milan (2017); David Lewis (2016); Portland Institute for Contemporary Art, Portland, OR (2015); Tang Museum, Skidmore College, NY (2015); Issue Project Room, New York (2015); ADN Collection, Bolzano, Italy (2015), CCS Bard College, NY (with Simon Fujiwara) (2012), among others.

=== Group shows ===
The artist has also been included in group exhibitions at The Watermill Center, Water Mill, NY (2018), the American Academy in Rome, Italy (2016); Public Art Fund, Art Basel Miami Beach, FL (2014); The Whitney Biennial curated by Elisabeth Sussman and Jay Sanders, Whitney Museum of American Art (2012); Tramway, Glasgow, Scotland (2012); Pacific Standard Time Public and Performance Art, Los Angeles, CA (2012); The Hammer Museum, Los Angeles, CA (2010); Los Angeles County Museum of Art, Los Angeles, CA (2008); The Migros Museum fur Genenwartskunst, Zurich (2005), among others.

== Collections ==
Kasper's work is included in the collections of the Whitney Museum of American Art, New York, NY; ADN Collection, Bolzano, Italy; and Aïshti Foundation, Beirut, Lebanon; among others.
