= "Untitled" (Portrait of Ross in L.A.) =

Work of art by Félix Gonzáles-Torres

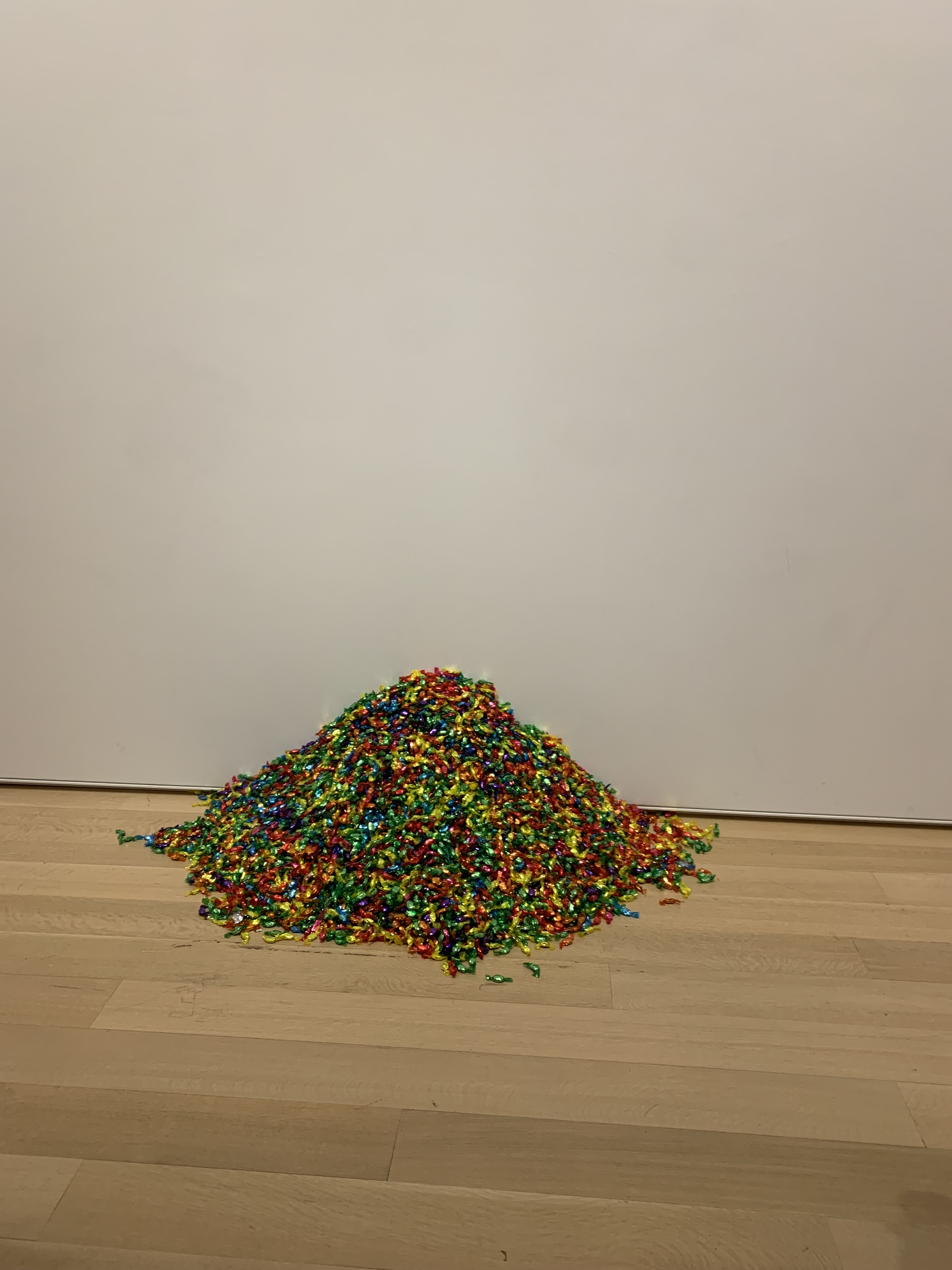
- The work at the Art Institute of Chicago in 2024
- Artist: Félix González-Torres
- Year: 1991
- Medium: Candies in variously colored wrappers, endless supply
- Dimensions: Overall dimensions vary with installation
- Weight: Ideally 175 lbs (79 kg)
- Location: Art Institute of Chicago, United States

"Untitled" (Portrait of Ross in L.A.) is a work of art by Félix González-Torres (or Felix Gonzalez-Torres), currently in the collection of the Art Institute of Chicago in Chicago, United States. The work is one of the twenty "candy works" in Gonzalez-Torres' oeuvre. The candy works consist of hard candies, either in piles or spread around, made to “symbolize the body, as both an inescapable mortal entity and a social force known as the ‘body politic.’” according to the Solomon R. Guggenheim Museum. These pieces are manifestable; the artworks are not physically permanent, they can exist in more than one place at a time and can vary from one installation to the next in response to the decisions made by the exhibitor, the interactions of audiences, and changing circumstances. This candy work has an ideal weight of 175 pounds (79 kg), representing González-Torrés' partner Ross Laycock, who died due to complications from AIDS in 1991.

== Presentation ==
A manifestation of "Untitled" (Portrait of Ross in L.A.) consists of a pile of candies individually wrapped in variously colored wrappers. Viewers are permitted to choose to take a piece of candy from the work and the caption states that there is an "endless supply" of candies.

The specific type of candy used to manifest the work, the initial choice of configuration and overall size and shape of a particular manifestation of the work are decided by the exhibitor. The candy works have been exhibited as rectangular carpets of candies, heaped in the corners of exhibition spaces, spread across the floor in organic arrangements and shaped into mounds on the ground, etc.

While the ideal weight of the work is a constant, the actual weight of the candies used to manifest the work is always in flux. The amount of candy changes as exhibitors make decisions about the weight that is initially installed, viewers choose to take candies from the work, and whether the candy is allowed to diminish and/or is replenished over the course of an exhibition. In one specific installation, art handlers at the Art Institute of Chicago recalled that the decisions for maintaining candies varied depending on visitors "During very busy periods, [we] may replenish the pile twice weekly, with approximately 45 pounds (20 kg) being added to the sculpture. On average, we add 15 or 20 pounds (6.8 or 9.1 kg) weekly." Sometimes the handlers would add candies to rebalance the piece's color.

Felix Gonzalez-Torres came up with specific and open-ended parameters for each artwork and the artist's foundation gathered information on the structure and nature of the artist's work via 'Core Tenets' for each body of work.

The Core Tenets for the body of candy works apply to "Untitled" (Portrait of Ross in L.A.)." While each body of work follows its own set of rules, Gonzalez-Torres's practice includes purposeful variations, within a body of work and between bodies of work, in order to foster engagement and questioning.

== Work exhibitions and interpretations ==
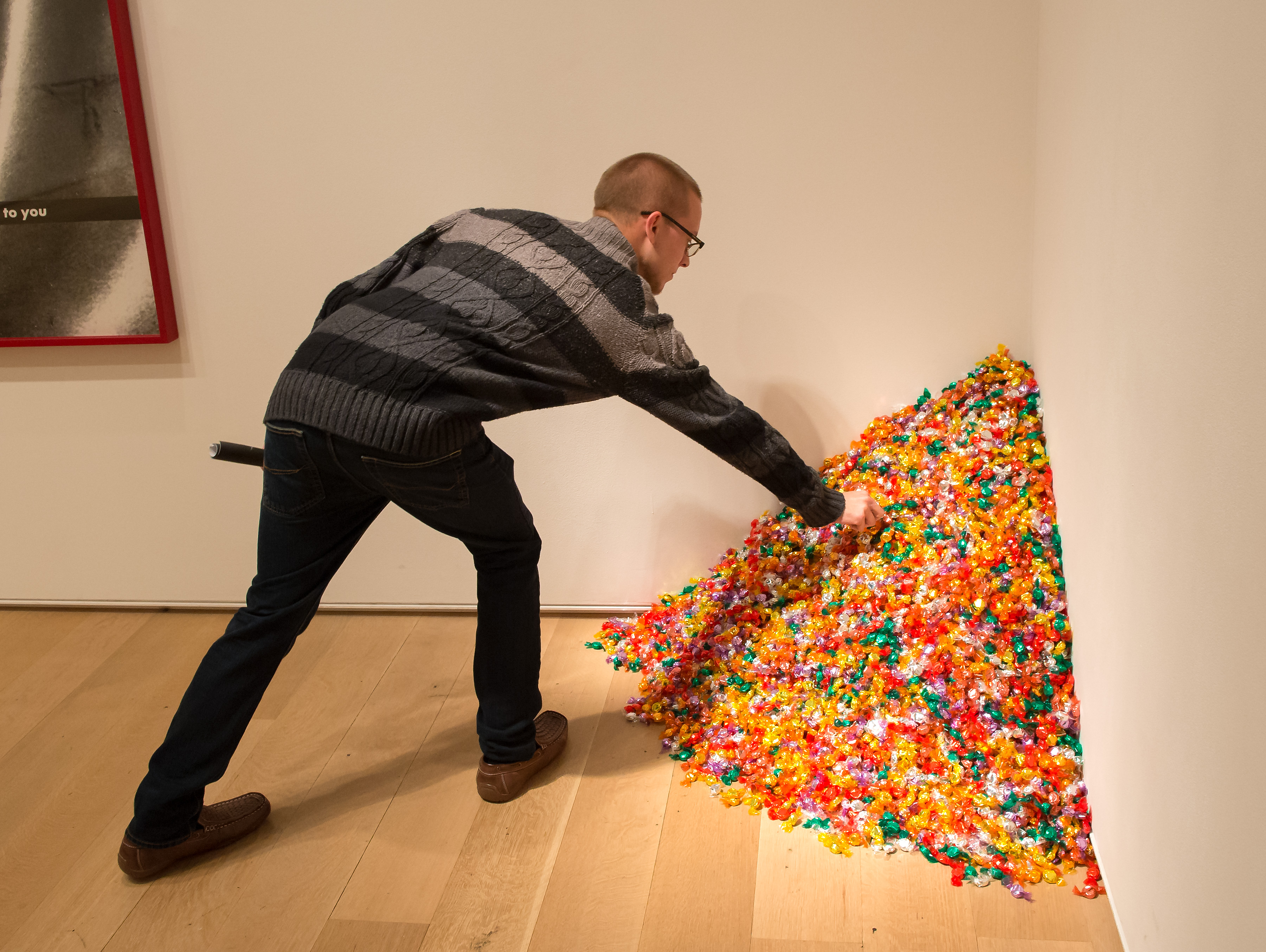
A man takes a candy from the work at the Art Institute of Chicago (2013)

González-Torres' partner Ross Laycock died of AIDS related complications in 1991, the same year "Untitled" (Portrait of Ross in L.A.) was created. The work has been interpreted as an "allegorical portrait" of Laycock as his health deteriorated.

"Untitled" (Portrait of Ross in L.A.) was first exhibited in a solo-presentation of the artist's work at Luhring Augustine Hetzler Gallery in Los Angeles, California, which was open from October 19 – November 16, 1991. The press release for the exhibition stated: "The real life and work of an artist exists within its own flowing continuum."

"Untitled" (Portrait of Ross in L.A.) and many other pieces of González-Torres' work were reviewed by Peter Schjeldahl on May 21, 1999. The review was later compiled and published in Schjeldahl's book "Hot, Cold, Heavy, Light: 100 Art Writings, 1988–2018." Schjeldahl commented: “González-Torres plainly assumes that the viewer is an individual with tastes, memories, and problems of his or her own. With silky modesty, he indicates troubles that he has with our society and culture”

The work was included in Could Not Bear the Sight of It: Contemporary Art Interventions on Critical Whiteness, an exhibition at the Jane Addams Hull House-Museum in Chicago, IL in 2012. The exhibition, curated by Lisa Yun Lee and Theaster Gates, sought to "ask a series of questions about how whiteness is both invisible and dominant: Is there any such thing as white culture? What is the secret to being white? How has whiteness changed over time? What does a world without racism look like?"

In 2016, "Untitled" (Portrait of Ross in L.A.) was installed at The Metropolitan Museum of Art as part of the exhibition Unfinished: Thoughts Left Visible. The exhibition centered on the question of when an artwork is considered finished, and included works which were left incomplete by their makers, as well as those which were intentionally unfinished as a way to embrace unlimited possibilities.

The Art Story Foundation viewed the candy-eating aspect as "[one becoming] complicit in the disappearing process - akin to the years-long public health crisis of HIV/AIDS." Lauren Weinberg of Time Out Chicago interpreted it similarly: "the diminishment recalls how he wasted away before dying".

The Art Story Foundation called "Untitled" (Portrait of Ross in L.A.) "one of González-Torres' most recognizable works." As of 2023, the work has been included in over 30 different exhibitions in galleries and museums around the world.

== Controversies ==
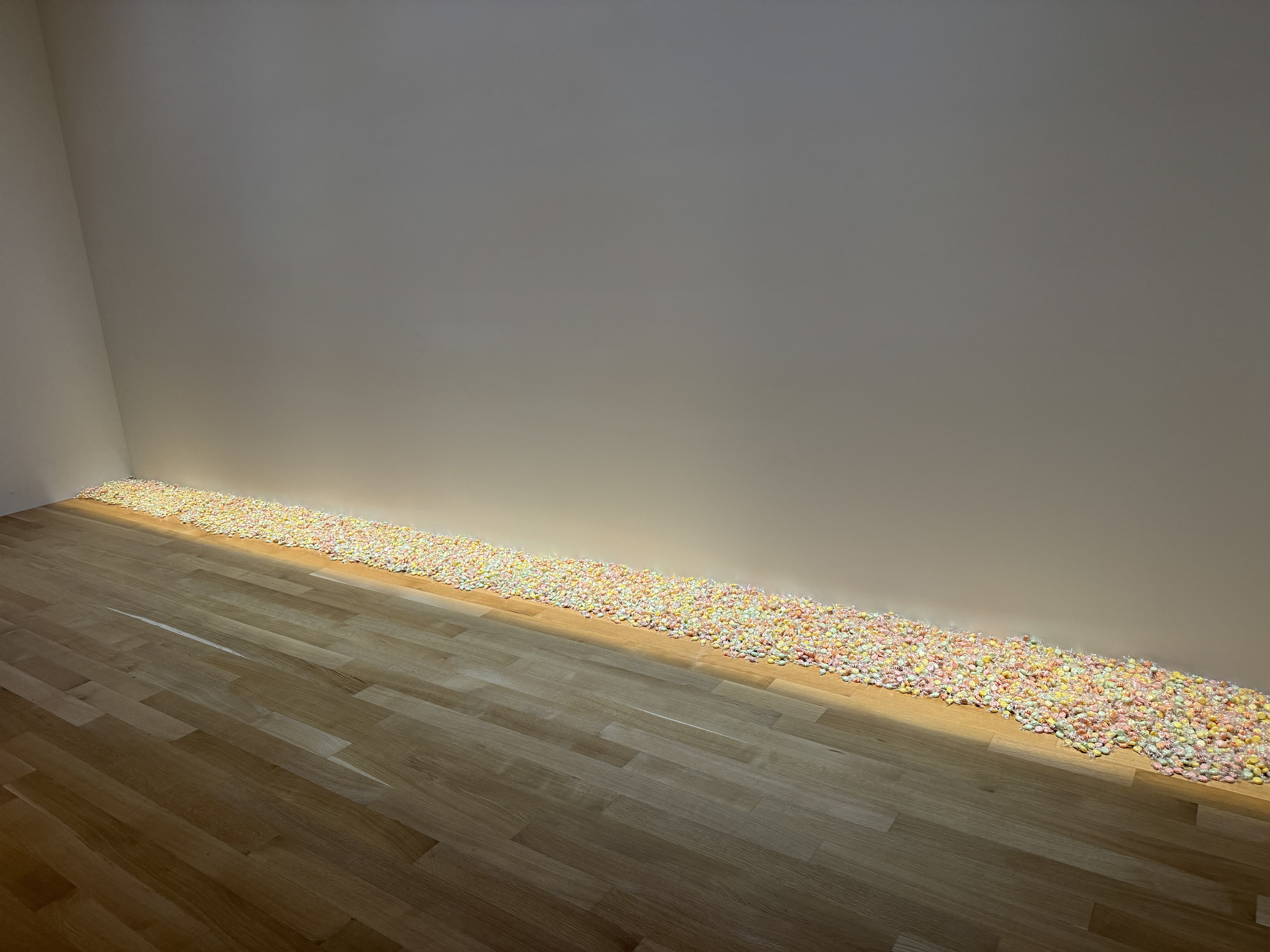
Installation of the work at the National Portrait Gallery in Washington, DC, in 2024

At some point between the summer of 2018 and fall of 2022, the Art Institute of Chicago removed references to Ross Laycock, homosexuality, and AIDS from the wall label for "Untitled" (Portrait of Ross in L.A.). This information remained in the audio guide that accompanied the installation. The edited label applauded Gonzalez-Torres's "uncanny ability to produce elegant and unrestrained sculptural forms out of common materials" and equates the 175 lb. of candy to the "average weight of an adult male". The edited label was replaced with a new wall label which included the previously removed context after the removal was decried by a letter in The Windy City Times and by a viral Tweet.

Joshua Chambers-Letson was quoted in an October 2022 article for the Chicago Tribune: "Felix left a lot of responsibility in the hands of the people who exhibit the piece, and he was very generous in allowing spectators to produce any meaning that they need to in relationship to the work.... I can understand that person's reaction, but also, Ross is in the title. Felix secured for the rest of all time that there would be a reference to Ross (in the work)."

In January 2023, Artnet News published an article that commented on these wall labels, saying "what the incident at the Art Institute illustrated was the complexities and nuances inherent to Gonzalez-Torres's work—and the intense personal connection to his story that many feel."

The Smithsonian Institution faced similar criticism in 2025 from art scholar Ignacio Darnaude writing for Out magazine about the National Portrait Gallery's installation of the work. The identifying label displayed directly next to the piece excluded reference to Ross Laycock, homosexuality, and AIDS, although another label in the same room explicitly named Ross as the subject of the work and referenced his relationship with González-Torres as well as his death from complications of HIV/AIDS.

== Exhibition history ==
- Collection Installation. The Art Institute of Chicago, Chicago, IL. 14 Jul. 2022 – ongoing.
- Objects of Wonder: from Pedestal to Interaction. ARoS Aarhus Kunstmuseum, Aarhus, Denmark. 12 Oct. 2019 – 1 Mar. 2020. Cur. Pernille Taagard Dinesen. Catalogue.
- Permanent Collection Installation. Art Institute of Chicago, Chicago, IL. 2018. Cur. Hendrik Folkerts.
- Felix Gonzalez-Torres. Rockbund Art Museum, Shanghai, China. 30 Sep. – 25 Dec. 2016. Cur. Larys Frogier and Li Qi.
- Unfinished: Thoughts Left Visible. The Metropolitan Museum of Art, New York, NY. 18 Mar. – 4 Sep. 2016. Catalogue.
- Permanent Collection Installation. Art Institute of Chicago, Chicago, IL. 13 Dec. 2015 – ongoing.
- Missing Persons. Cantor Arts Center at Stanford University, Stanford, CA. 11 Nov. 2015 – 21 Mar. 2016. Catalogue.
- More Love: Art, Politics and Sharing Since the 1990s. Ackland Art Museum, University of North Carolina at Chapel Hill, NC. 1 Feb. – 31 Mar. 2013. Cur. Claire Schneider. Catalogue. [Travels to Cheekwood, Nashville, TN. 20 Sep. 2013 – 5 Jan. 2014.]
- Where There's a Will, There's a Way. PinchukArtCentre, Kiev, Ukraine. 16 Nov. 2013 – 5 Jan. 2014. Organized with the Elena Pinchuk ANTIAIDS Foundation.
- Feast: Radical Hospitality and Contemporary Art. Smart Museum at the University of Chicago, Chicago, IL. 16 Feb. – 10 Jun. 2012. Cur. Stephanie Smith. Catalogue. [Travels to: Blaffer Art Museum, University of Houston, Houston, TX. 7 Sep. – 7 Dec. 2013; SITE, Santa Fe, NM. 1 Feb. – 17 May 2014; Gund Gallery, Kenyon College, Gambier, OH. 25 Jul. – 30 Nov. 2014; Weisman Art Museum, University of Minnesota, Minneapolis, MN. 08 Feb. – 10 May 2015.]
- Could Not Bear the Sight of It: Contemporary Art Interventions on Critical Whiteness. Jane Adams Hull House-Museum, Chicago, IL. 23 Oct. – 21 Nov. 2012. Cur. Lisa Yun Lee and Theaster Gates.
- Regarding Warhol: Sixty Artists, Fifty Years. The Metropolitan Museum of Art, New York, NY. 18 Sep. – 31 Dec. 2012. Catalogue. [Travels to The Warhol Museum, Pittsburgh, PA. 3 Feb. – 28 Apr. 2013.]
- Permanent Collection Installation. The Art Institute of Chicago, Chicago, IL. 2012 – 2013.
- Felix Gonzalez-Torres in the Modern Wing. The Art Institute of Chicago, Chicago, IL. 20 Jul. 2011 – 8 Jan. 2012.
- Felix Gonzalez-Torres: Specific Objects without Specific Form. Fondation Beyeler, Basel, Switzerland. 21 May – 25 Jul. 2010. Cur. Elena Filipovic; 31 Jul. – 29 Aug. 2010. Installation cur. Carol Bove. Catalogue. [Second installation at second of three venues. Additional venues: Wiels Contemporary Art Centre, Brussels, Belgium. 16 Jan. – 2 May 2010; MMK Museum für Moderne Kunst, Frankfurt, Germany. 28 Jan. – 25 Apr. 2011.]
- Contemporary Collecting: Selections from the Donna and Howard Stone Collection. The Art Institute of Chicago, Chicago, IL. 24 Jun. – 19 Sep. 2010. Cur. James Rondeau. Catalogue.
- Felix Gonzalez-Torres: Specific Objects without Specific Form. Fondation Beyeler, Basel, Switzerland. 21 May – 25 Jul. 2010. Cur. Elena Filipovic; 31 Jul. – 29 Aug. 2010. Installation cur. Carol Bove. Catalogue. [First installation at second venue. Second of three venues. Additional venues: Wiels Contemporary Art Centre, Brussels, Belgium. 16 Jan. – 2 May 2010; MMK Museum für Moderne Kunst, Frankfurt, Germany. 28 Jan. – 25 Apr. 2011.]
- I Love You. ARoS Aarhus Kunstmuseum, Aarhus, Denmark. 27 Mar. – 12 Sep. 2010. Cur. Pernille Taagard Dinesen. Catalogue.
- Hide/Seek: Difference and Desire in American Portraiture. National Portrait Gallery, The Smithsonian Institution, Washington, D.C. 30 Oct. 2010 – 13 Feb. 2011. Cur. Jonathan Katz and David Ward. Catalogue. [Travels to: Brooklyn Museum, Brooklyn, NY. 18 Nov. 2011 – 12 Feb. 2012; Tacoma Art Museum, Tacoma, WA. 17 Mar. – 10 Jun. 2012.]
- The Modern Wing. The Art Institute of Chicago, Chicago, IL. 16 May 2009 – 7 Apr. 2010.
- Permanent Collection Installation. The Art Institute of Chicago, Chicago, IL. 2008.
- Let Everything Be Temporary, or When is the Exhibition? apexart, New York, NY. 10 Jan. – 17 Feb. 2007. Cur. Elena Filipovic. Brochure.
- Six Feet Under – Autopsie unseres Umgangs mit Toten [Six Feet Under – Autopsy of our Relation to the Dead]. Kunstmuseum Bern, Bern, Switzerland. 2 Nov. 2006 – 21 Jan. 2007. Cur. Bernhard Fibicher and Susanne Friedli. Catalogue. [Travels to: Deutsches Hygiene Museum, Dresden, Germany. 22 Sep. 2007 – 30 Mar. 2008.]
- Universal Experience: Art, Life and the Tourist's Eye. Museum of Contemporary Art (MCA), Chicago, IL. 12 Feb. – 5 Jun. 2005. Cur. Francesco Bonami. Catalogue. [Travels to: Hayward Gallery, London, England, United Kingdom. 6 Oct. – 11 Dec. 2005; Museo d'Arte Moderna e Contemporanea di Trento e Roverto (MART), Roverto, Italy. 10 Feb. – 14 May 2006.]
- Permanent Collection Installation. The Art Institute of Chicago, Chicago, IL. 2005.
- s(how): ICA Art History Project. Institute of Contemporary Art, University of Pennsylvania, Philadelphia, PA. 3 May – 27 Jul. 2003. Cur. Justin Belmont and Nancy Oster.
- Untitled (Sculpture): Kendall Geers, Martin Kippenburger, Reinhard Mucha, Rachel Whiteread, Janet Cardiff and George Bures Miller, Felix Gonzalez-Torres, Robert Gober, Tunga, Steve Wolfe. Luhring Augustine Gallery, New York, NY. 8 Jan. – 12 Feb. 2000.
- The American Century: Art and Culture, 1950 – 2000. The Whitney Museum of American Art, New York, NY. 26 Sep. 1999 – 13 Feb. 2000. Cur. Lisa Phillips. Catalogue. [Part two of the exhibition The American Century: Art and Culture, 1900 – 2000. 23 Apr. 1999 – 13 Feb. 2000.]
- Culbutes: Oeuvre d'Impertinence or Head Over Heels Into the Millenium. Musée d'art contemporain de Montréal, Montréal, Canada. 18 Nov. 1999 – 23 Apr. 2000. Cur. Paulette Gagnon and Sandra Grant Marchand. Catalogue.
- Artificial. Figuracions contemporànies [Artificial: Contemporary Figurations]. El Museu d'Art Contemporani, Barcelona, Spain. 21 Jan. – 15 Mar. 1998. Cur. José Lebrero Stals. Catalogue.
- Present Tense: Nine Artists in the Nineties. The San Francisco Museum of Modern Art (SFMOMA), San Francisco, CA. 13 Sep. 1997 – 13 Jan. 1998. Organized by Janet Bishop, Gary Garrels, and John S. Weber. Catalogue.
- Tema AIDS. Sonja Henie-Niels Onstad Art Center, Hovikodden, Norway. 8 May – 8 Jul. 1993. Cur. Kim Levin. [Travels to: Norway Museum, Bergen, Norway; Karl Ernst Osthaus Museum, Hagen, Germany. Dec. 1993 – Jan. 1994.]
- Works on Loan from the Collection of Vivian and David Campbell. Art Gallery of Ontario, Toronto, Canada. 21 Jan. – 6 Aug. 1993.
- Post Human: New Forms of Figuration in Contemporary Art. FAE Musée d'art contemporain, Pully/Lausanne, Switzerland. 14 June – 13 Sep. 1992. Cur. Jeffrey Deitch. Catalogue. [Travels to: Castello di Rivoli, Turin, Italy. 1 Oct. – 22 Nov. 1992; Deste Foundation for Contemporary Art, Athens, Greece. 3 Dec. 1992 – 14 Feb. 1993; Deichtorhallen Hamburg, Hamburg, Germany. 12 Mar. – 9 May 1993; The Israel Museum, Jerusalem, Israel. 21 Jun. – 10 Oct. 1993].
- Felix Gonzalez-Torres. Luhring Augustine Hetzler Gallery, Los Angeles, CA. 19 Oct. – 16 Nov. 1991.
- Works on Loan from the Collection of Art Bridges and Crystal Bridges Museum of American Art. University of Louisville, Speed Art Museum, Louisville, KY. 2023 - Ongoing.
- The Message is the Medium, On Loan from the Art Bridges Foundation and the Crystal Bridges Museum of Art. Indianapolis Museum of Art, Indianapolis, IN. 2025 - Ongoing.

== See also ==
- Day Without Art
- Electric Fan (Feel It Motherfuckers)
- Visual AIDS
