= I'm Your Woman (album) =

- Vinyl variant of official 1985 release

Studio album by Sandra Bernhard
- Released: 1985
- Recorded: 1985
- Genre: Comedy; pop
- Label: Mercury

Sandra Bernhard chronology
I'm Your Woman (1985)	Without You I'm Nothing (1989)

Professional ratings
Review scores
Source	Rating
Christgau's Record Guide	C+

I'm Your Woman is the first album released by comedian and singer Sandra Bernhard. It was released on the Mercury label on vinyl and cassette in 1985. It has never had an official release on compact disc, although CD-R copies were once available for sale on Bernhard's own website and at her live shows. The album is a studio recording and contains eight songs interspersed with spoken-word vignettes.

== Track listing ==
Side one
No.	Title	Lyrics	Music	Length
1.	"Hard to Believe Face"			0:50
2.	"I'm Your Woman"	Rick Maslow	Barry Reynolds	4:57
3.	"Late Night Roads"			0:16
4.	"Love Comes Marching Through"	Barry Reynolds	Barry Reynolds	4:10
5.	"Out of Control with Young People"			0:33
6.	"Everybody's Young"	Rick Maslow	Barry Reynolds	4:17
7.	"Relationships/Baby Talk"			1:02
8.	"Three Kisses for Sandy"			0:53
9.	"Losing Yourself"	Rick Maslow, Sandra Bernhard	Barry Reynolds, Robert Kraft	3:55

Side two
No.	Title	Lyrics	Music	Length
1.	"In the Future"			0:38
2.	"Don't Hold Me"			0:20
3.	"Hold Me, Promise Me"	Rick Maslow, Sandra Bernhard	Barry Reynolds, Robert Kraft	3:12
4.	"Almost Torture"	Rick Maslow, Sandra Bernhard	Barry Reynolds	4:29
5.	"Are You Sixteen?"			0:28
6.	"Boys Come Running"	Rick Maslow, Sandra Bernhard	Samuel Franklin	3:50
7.	"Airport"			3:38
8.	"Near The Top"	Rick Maslow, Sandra Bernhard	Samuel Franklin	4:19

== Credits ==
- Music produced and arranged by Barry Reynolds
- Recorded at The Fallout Shelter, London
- Mastered by Greg Calbi, Sterling Sound, New York
- Keyboards: Rupert Black, Barry Reynolds
- Guitars: Robert John Tolchard, Mikey Mao Chung, Barry Reynolds
- Bass: Mikey Mao Chung
- Drums: Terry Stannard
- Background vocals: Adele Bertei, Robert John Tolchard, Barrington Fox Reynolds III
- Engineer: Stephen Street

- Talk produced by Irene Pinn
- Recorded at The Strongroom, London
- Engineer: Philip Bodger
