= Sandra Bernhard =

American actress and comedian (born 1955)

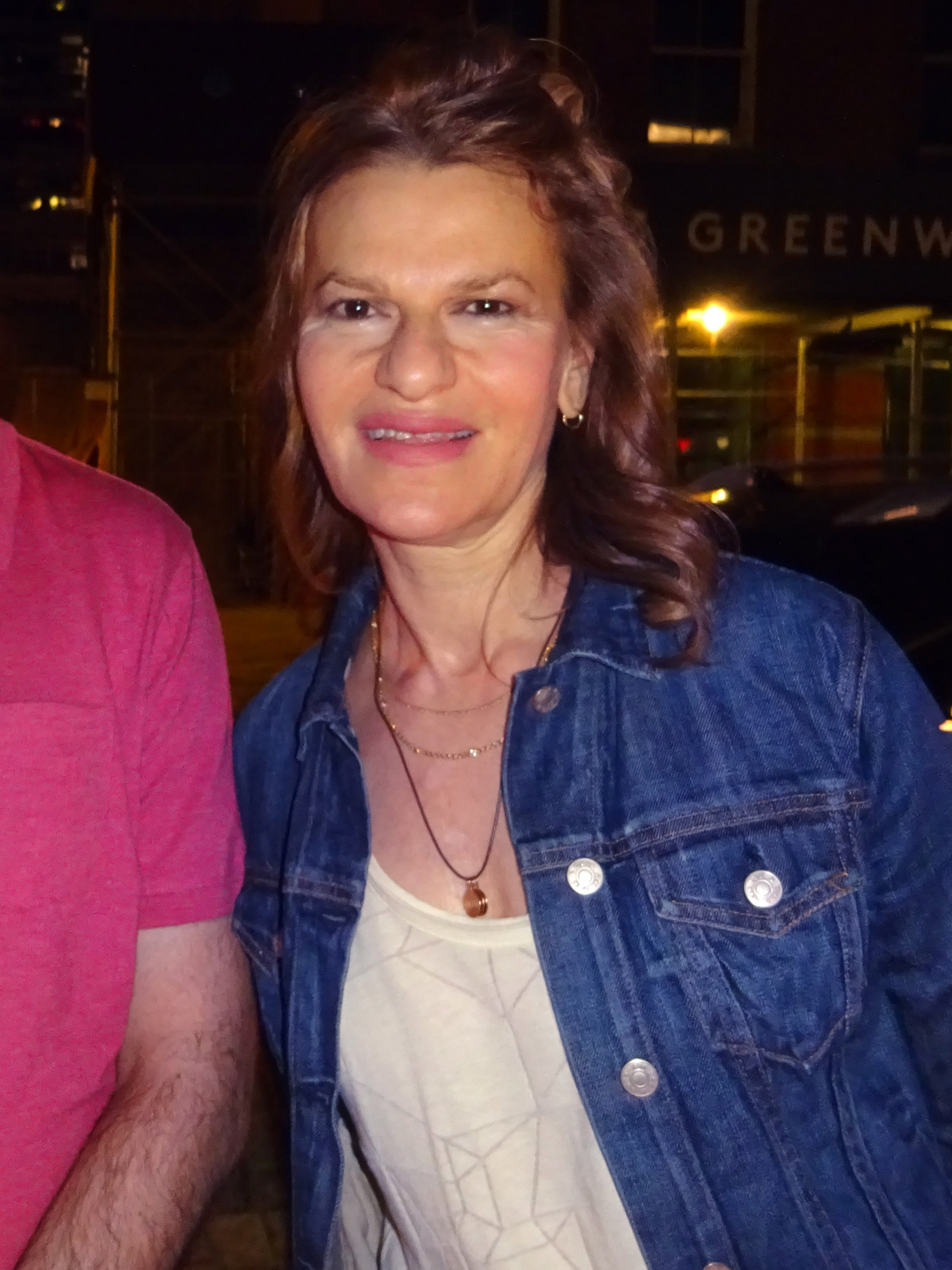
- Bernhard in 2016
- Born: June 6, 1955 (age 71); Flint, Michigan, U.S.
- Occupations: Actress; comedian; singer; author
- Years active: 1977–present
- Known for: Nancy Bartlett Thomas in Roseanne and Judy Kubrak in Pose
- Partner: Sara Switzer (1999–present)
- Children: 1
- Website: sandrabernhard.com

Sandra Bernhard (born June 6, 1955) is an American actress, comedian, and singer. She first gained attention in the late 1970s with her stand-up comedy, where she often critiqued celebrity culture and political figures. Bernhard is also well known as the ex-best friend of Madonna.

She played Nancy Bartlett Thomas on the ABC sitcom Roseanne from the fourth season (1991) to the end of the show in 1997. She played Masha in Martin Scorsese's film The King of Comedy, Nurse Judy Kubrak in the FX drama series Pose, and Nurse Cecily on the Apple TV+ series Severance. She is number 96 on Comedy Central's list of the 100 greatest stand-ups of all time.

== Early life ==
Bernhard was born June 6, 1955, in Flint, Michigan, the daughter of Jeanette (née LaZebnik; 1921–2014) and proctologist Jerome Bernhard (1922–2025). She was raised Conservative Jewish.

She has three older brothers: Dan, David, and Mark. Her family moved to Scottsdale, Arizona when she was 10. She attended Saguaro High School, graduating in 1973.

In 1973, she traveled to Israel and stayed for 7 months at Kibbutz Kfar Menahem with her friend Daniel Chick. She later returned to Israel during the Yom Kippur War.

== Career ==
=== Stand-up ===
In 1974, after she graduated high school, Bernhard moved to Los Angeles and enrolled in beauty school. She did open mics and performed at clubs until she became a regular at The Comedy Store in Hollywood. Her mentors at the Comedy Store were Paul Mooney and Lotus Weinstock. As her popularity as a comedian grew, she was cast as a supporting player on The Richard Pryor Show in 1977. Bernhard pivoted to acting in 1981 when she was cast in Martin Scorsese's to The King of Comedy, for which she won the National Society of Film Critics Award for Best Supporting Actress.

=== Television ===
Bernhard was a frequent guest on David Letterman's NBC program Late Night with David Letterman, making 30 appearances starting in 1983. Bernhard appeared with her then good friend (and rumored lover) Madonna on a 1988 episode of Late Night with David Letterman. The two alluded to their romantic relationship and staged a sexy confrontation; the appearance received much publicity. They continued to be friends for several years, with Bernhard making an appearance in Madonna's film Truth or Dare. The friendship ended in 1992.

In 1991, Bernhard began playing Nancy Bartlett on the hit sitcom Roseanne. She appeared in 33 episodes between 1991 and 1997, and was one of the first actresses to portray an openly bisexual recurring character on American television.

She hosted the USA Network's Reel Wild Cinema for two seasons beginning in 1995. Also that year, Bernhard appeared as a guest in the "Jerk" episode of the animated talk show Space Ghost Coast to Coast. The following year, she guest-starred on an episode of Highlander: The Series called "Dramatic License", where she played a romance novelist writing about the life of the main character.

Bernhard appeared as herself on Will & Grace, in an episode where the title characters spuriously bid on Bernhard's Manhattan apartment in an attempt to become friendly with her. When their ruse is exposed, Bernhard rants at them, with the sounds of a blender (she was having a smoothie made) blotting out supposed obscenities. She briefly returned as herself two years later.

In 2006, Bernhard hosted the first season of the reality competition show The Search for the Funniest Mother in America on Nick at Nite. In an interview with Howard Stern, she revealed that she was originally offered the role of Miranda Hobbes on the TV show Sex and the City, but opted out owing to the "terrible" original script and small paycheck. In 2013, it was announced that she would join the cast of ABC Family's Switched at Birth with Glee's Max Adler, where she would play an art professor on the season 3 opener in January 2014.

In 2015, she made her first appearance as the recurring character of Joedth ("Joe") in season 4 of 2 Broke Girls. From 2018 until 2021, she played Nurse Judy on FX's Pose, a show based on queer and trans ball culture in Manhattan inspired by the documentary Paris Is Burning. In 2025, she appeared in Severance as Cecily, a nurse.

In February 2026, Bernhard was cast in the upcoming fourth season of HBO's The White Lotus, created by Mike White. In a March 2026 red-carpet interview at the Actor Awards, Bernhard revealed she had urged White for 25 years to write her a starring role, stating he had finally done so for this season: "What made me beg Mike White for 25 years as his friend, to say, 'When are you writing me a star-turning role?' Mike, what do I have to do? He loves me. We love each other. And he finally said, 'This is it. This is the season.' This is it, and it's the right time."

=== Specials and albums ===
Bernhard began performing her first one-woman show, I'm Your Woman, in 1985, and an album version was released. She appeared in a variety of small television roles throughout the 1980s while crafting her stand-up routine into a more performance art-oriented show. She launched an off-Broadway one-woman show called Without You, I'm Nothing, With You, I'm Not Much Better in 1988, which played at the Orpheum Theatre. By 1990, it had become a film and a double album of the same title. Bernhard was nominated for a Grammy Award for Best Comedy Album in 1990.

In 1991, she released her first studio album, Excuses for Bad Behavior (Part One).

In September 1992, Bernhard appeared in a nude pictorial for Playboy.

Bernhard returned to Broadway in 1998 with the show I'm Still Here... Damn It!, recorded for a live comedy album. She was pregnant at the time, and gave birth to a daughter, Cicely, on July 4, 1998. She returned to New York in 2006 with the off-Broadway show Everything Bad & Beautiful. The CD of the show, released by indie label Breaking Records, was lauded as one of her best.

2007 saw the debut of her one-woman show Plan B from Outer Space, and the inclusion of her Hanukkah-themed song "Miracle of Lights", which she co-wrote with Mitchell Kaplan, in the Breaking Records compilation album Breaking For the Holidays. She toured Plan B through 2008 and performed "Miracle of Lights" on some morning shows in New York.

Bernhard was a featured guest singer with children's artist Dan Zanes on the Family Dance album's "Thrift Shop".

In 2015, she began hosting a radio show, Sandyland, on Sirius XM's Radio Andy.

=== Film ===
Bernhard starred in 1991's Hudson Hawk, directed by Michael Lehrman and starring Bruce Willis. She also starred in 1994's Dallas Doll.

In October 2024, Bernhard joined the cast of the A24 film Marty Supreme, directed by Josh Safdie and starring Timothée Chalamet. She appears as Judy, a neighbor and friend of Fran Drescher's character.

== Personal life ==
Bernhard identifies herself as bisexual and is a strong supporter of LGBTQ rights. In July 1998, she gave birth to a daughter whom she raised with Sara Switzer, her partner of more than 20 years. Bernhard was also in a relationship with Venezuelan actress Patricia Velásquez.

== Controversies ==
In 1995, while serving as a guest panelist on the Comedy Central talk show Politically Incorrect, Bernhard became engaged in an argument with fellow panelist, conservative political commentator John Lofton. Bernhard then stood up and spat at Lofton and exclaimed, "If I had you, you'd be an abortion."

In August 2006, Bernhard served as the spokesperson in a commercial for Make-up Art Cosmetics (MAC). In the commercial, promoting PlushGlass lipgloss, she referred to someone who might not approve of her outspokenness as a "little freaked out, intimidated, frightened, right-wing Republican thin-lipped bitch." MAC edited the line from the commercial to avoid offending some of its customers.

In September 2008, she warned vice-presidential candidate Sarah Palin that she would be gang-raped by her "big black brothers" if she visited Manhattan. Palin had a campaign stop planned in New York City at the time.

In November 2020, during an interview with Mariah Carey, Naomi Campbell criticised Bernhard for her comments about Carey and Black men in her 1998 comedy show I'm Still Here... Damn It! In the show, Bernhard disparaged Carey's Black ancestry, saying "She's trying to backtrack on our asses by acting real ni****-ish there at the Royalton Hotel suite with Puff Daddy and all the greasy, chain-wearing Black men."

== Filmography ==
=== Film ===
Year	Title	Role	Notes
1980	Shogun Assassin	Voice over in English dub	
1981	Cheech & Chong's Nice Dreams	Girl Nut	
1983	The King of Comedy	Masha	National Society of Film Critics Award for Best Supporting Actress
1984	The House of God	Angel Dutton	
1985	Sesame Street Presents: Follow That Bird	Grouch Diner Waitress	Cameo
1986	The Whoopee Boys	Extra	Uncredited
1988	Casual Sex?	Extra	Uncredited
1988	Track 29	Nurse Stein	
1989	Heavy Petting	Herself	Documentary
1990	Without You I'm Nothing	Herself	Also writer
1991	Madonna: Truth or Dare	Herself	Documentary
1991	Hudson Hawk	Minerva Mayflower	
1992	Inside Monkey Zetterland	Imogene	
1994	Sandra Bernhard: Confessions of a Pretty Lady	Herself	
1994	Dallas Doll	Dallas Adair	
1995	Unzipped	Herself	Documentary
1995	One Hundred and One Nights	La première quêteuse	
1995	The Reggae Movie	Herself	Documentary
1995	Catwalk	Herself	Documentary
1997	Lover Girl	Marci Guerra/'Angel'	
1997	The Apocalypse	J.T. Wayne	
1997	Plump Fiction	Bunny Roberts	
1998	An Alan Smithee Film: Burn Hollywood Burn	Ann Glover	
1998	Exposé	Janet	
1998	Wrongfully Accused	Dr. Fridley	
1998	Somewhere in the City	Betty	
1998	I Woke Up Early the Day I Died	Sandy Sands/Professional Mourner and Stripper	
2000	One Hell of a Guy	God	Voice
2000	Playing Mona Lisa	Bibi Carlson	Stony Brook Film Festival Audience Choice Award for Best Feature
2000	Dinner Rush	Jennifer Freely	
2001	Zoolander	Herself	Cameo appearance
2003	The Grumpy Bug	Narrator	Voice
2004	The N-Word	Herself	Documentary
2004	The Easter Egg Adventure	Claralyne Cluck	Voice
2005	Searching for Bobby D	Sherri Dansen	
2009	Dare	Dr. Serena Mohr	
2010	See You in September	Charlotte	
2011	Looking for Lenny	Herself	Documentary
2024	Babes	Dr. Shirley	
2025	Out of Order	Judge Stevenson	
2025	Marty Supreme	Judy	

=== Television ===
Year	Title	Role	Notes
1977	The Richard Pryor Show	Featured Performer	4 episodes
1985	Alfred Hitchcock Presents	Karen	Episode: "Night Caller"
1990	Pee-wee's Playhouse	Rhonda	Episode: "Camping Out"
1991–1997, 2018	Roseanne	Nancy Bartlett	Recurring role
1992	Sandra After Dark, with Your Hostess, Sandra Bernhard	Herself	TV movie; also co-executive producer
1992–1993	The A-List	Herself/host	Unknown episodes
1994–1996	Reel Wild Cinema	Herself/host	22 episodes
1995	Space Ghost Coast to Coast	Herself	Episode: "Jerk"
1995	Freaky Friday	Frieda Debny	TV movie
1995	The Larry Sanders Show	Herself	2 episodes
1996	Dr. Katz, Professional Therapist	Herself	Voice, episode: "A Journey for the Betterment of People"
1996	The Late Shift	Herself	TV movie
1996	Highlander: The Series	Carolyn Marsh	Episode: "Dramatic License"
1997	Superman: The Animated Series	Ms. Gsptlsnz	Voice, episode: "Mxyzpixilated"
1997	Ally McBeal	Caroline Poop	2 episodes
1997	Spider-Man	Sarah Baker	Voice, episode: "Partners"
1998–1999	Hercules	Cassandra	Voice, main role
1999	Sandra Bernhard - I'm Still Here..Damn It!	Herself	TV movie; also writer
2000	The Sopranos	Herself	Episode: "D-Girl"
2001–2002	Will & Grace	Herself	2 episodes
2001	Sandra Bernhard: Giving Them Lip	Herself	TV movie
2002	The Grumpy Bug	Narrator	Nick Jr. short series
2001–2003	The Sandra Bernhard Experience	Herself/host	Unknown episodes
2003	Law & Order: Special Victims Unit	Priscilla Chaney	Episode: "Desperate"
2003	Girlfriends	Marcia	Episode: "And Baby Makes Four"
2004	Silver Lake	Sheila Fontana	Unsold pilot
2004	The Grumpy Bug	Narrator	Voice
2004	Whoopi's Littleburg	The Macaroni Lady	Episode: "Tah Dah Day"
2005	Crossing Jordan	Roz Framus	2 episodes
2005	The L Word	Charlotte Birch	5 episodes
2005–2006	The Queer Edge	Herself/co-host	26 episodes
2007	Las Vegas	Margo Poon	Episode: "The Burning Bedouin"
2007	The New Adventures of Old Christine	Audrey	Episode: "Strange Bedfellows"
2009	Head Case	Herself	Episode: "That's Produce"
2011	Roseanne's Nuts	Herself	Episode: "Grannies Night Out"
2011	Hot in Cleveland	Nan	Episode: "Beards"
2012	Family Guy	Herself	Voice, episode: "Ratings Guy"
2012	GCB	Debby Horowitz	Episode: "Revelation"
2012	DTLA	Carla	3 episodes
2013	The Neighbors	Ms. Porsche	Episode: "I Believe I Can Drive"
2014	Switched at Birth	Prof. Teresa Ledarsky	4 episodes
2014	You're the Worst	Herself	Episode: "Equally Dead Inside"
2014–2015	Brooklyn Nine-Nine	Darlene Linetti	3 episodes
2015	2 Broke Girls	Joedth	5 episodes
2016	Difficult People	Lilith Feigenbaum	Episode: "Unplugged"
2017	Broad City	Brenda	2 episodes
2018–2021	Pose	Judy Kubrak	13 episodes
2018	American Horror Story: Apocalypse	High Priestess Hannah Putt	Episode: "Sojourn"
2019	Sweetbitter	Maddie Glover	Episode: "Last of the Season"
2020	The Comedy Store	Herself	2 episodes
2022	American Horror Story: NYC	Fran Levinsky	6 episodes
2024	So Help Me Todd	Attorney Belinda Tuttle	Episode: "The Queen of Courts"
2025	RuPaul's Drag Race	Herself (guest judge)	Episode: "Monopulence!"
2025	Severance	Nurse Cecily	Recurring
2025	Survival of the Thickest	Hannah Sommar	Episode: "A Change Gon' Come, Bitch?"
2025	Percy Jackson and the Olympians	Anger	Episode: "I Play Dodgeball with Cannibals"
TBA	The White Lotus		Season 4

=== Short subjects ===
Year	Title	Role	Notes
1996	Museum of Love	Kitty	
2003	The Third Date	Ola	
2006	Twenty Dollar Drinks	Star	

== Discography ==
Bernhard performs classic pop music, jazz, and blues tunes. She has released several albums (combinations of music and comedy).

=== Albums ===
- I'm Your Woman (1985)
- Without You I'm Nothing (1989)
- Excuses for Bad Behavior (Part One) (1994) – No. 40 Billboard Heatseekers Chart
- I'm Still Here... Damn It! (1998)
- The Love Machine (2001)
- Hero Worship (2003)
- Excuses for Bad Behavior (Part Two) (2004)
- Giving Til It Hurts (2004)
- Live and Beautiful (2005) – promotional album sold at website sandrabernhard.com
- Gems of Mystery (2006)
- Everything Bad & Beautiful (2006)
- Whatever It Takes (2009)
- I Love Being Me, Don't You? featuring Carla Patullo (2011) – No. 9 Billboard Comedy Chart

=== Singles ===
- "Everybody's Young" (1985)
- "You Make Me Feel (Mighty Real)" (1994) – No. 13 U.S. Billboard Hot Dance Club Play
- "Manic Superstar" (1994)
- "Phone Sex (Do You Want Me Tonight?)" (1994)
- "On the Runway" (1999) – No. 39 U.S. Billboard Hot Dance Club Play
- "Miracle of Lights" (2007)
- "Perfection" (2008)
- "All Around" (2009)

=== Compilations ===
- Stormy Weather; song "Is That All There Is?"
- Divas of Dance – Volume 3 (Remixes); song "You Make Me Feel (Mighty Real)"
- Breaking for the Holidays; song "Miracle of Lights"

== Bibliography ==
- Confessions of a Pretty Lady, an autobiography (HarperCollins October 1989 ISBN 978-0-06-091620-6)
- Love, Love and Love, essay collection (HarperCollins June 1993 ISBN 978-0-06-016615-1)
- May I Kiss You on the Lips, Miss Sandra?, semi-autobiography (HarperCollins October 1999 ISBN 978-0-68-817163-6)

== Awards and nominations ==
Year	Award	Category	Nominated work	Result
1983	National Society of Film Critics Award	Best Supporting Actress	The King of Comedy	Won
1991	Golden Raspberry Award	Worst Supporting Actress	Hudson Hawk	Nominated
1997	Online Film & Television Association Award	Best Guest Actress in a Syndicated Series	Highlander: The Series	Nominated
2002	GLAAD Media Award	Davidson/Valentini Award	Herself	Won
2006	Philadelphia QFest Award	Artistic Achievement Award	Herself	Won
2019	Online Film & Television Association	Best Guest Actress in a Drama Series	Pose	Nominated
2026	Actor Award	Outstanding Cast in a Motion Picture	Marty Supreme	Nominated

== See also ==
- LGBT culture in New York City
- List of LGBT people from New York City
- NYC Pride March
