= Boskovich Farms =

- Company type: Private
- Founded: 1915
- Headquarters: Oxnard, California, United States
- Website: boskovichfarms.com

Boskovich Farms is a historic vegetable producer based in Oxnard, California, U.S. It has operations in California, Arizona and Mexico.

== History ==
The company was founded by Croatian-born Stephen Boskovich in 1915, shortly after he purchased land from James Boon Lankershim. Boskovich first grew green onions. The company was inherited by his children, followed by his grandchildren.

The company grows "beets, broccoli, Brussels sprouts, cabbage, carrots, celery, chard, cilantro, collards, endive, escarole, fennel, green onions, kale, leaf, leeks, parsley, radish, romaine, and spinach; and apples, banana, bell pepper, onion, tomato" in California and Mexico. Since 2012, it has grown organic vegetables. It ships its produce from its facilities in Salinas, California and Yuma, Arizona.
