= Everything Bad & Beautiful =

Live album by Sandra Bernhard
- Released: 2006
- Recorded: 2006
- Genre: Comedy; pop
- Length: 86:42
- Label: Breaking Records
- Producer: Cynthia Daniels

Sandra Bernhard chronology
Gems of Mystery (2005)	Everything Bad & Beautiful (2006)

Everything Bad & Beautiful is the title of a live stage show and album performed/recorded by singer/comedian/actress Sandra Bernhard. The show ran in 2006 in New York City at the Daryl Roth Theatre. In the performance Bernhard does what she is best known for: she rips apart celebrity culture while commenting on events of the time. Among the topics she addresses: Britney Spears, Laura Bush, Condoleezza Rice, Bob Dylan, Mariah Carey, golf and the war on terror.

The album, released in 2006, is a live recording of her one-woman show of the same title; it combines comedic monologues and musical performances. It was released by Breaking Records and was originally sold through the website and in the lobby of the live show. Unlike the majority of her other CD releases, it was a professionally manufactured CD and not a home-made CD-R.

In 2007 the label acquired a distribution deal for the album and a re-released version with an alternate track listing was released. It has slightly alternate artwork (only "one Sandra" appears on the cover instead of 3) and features bonus digital video content.

Most of the songs on the album are covers of other people's songs. They include Christina Aguilera, Missy Elliott, Lita Ford, Vanity 6, Sheila E., Bob Dylan, Pink and Prince.

== Reception ==
In his review of the stage show, theater critic John Lahr said the show "intersperses songs with the flimflammery of social commentary, personal history, fantasy, and kvetching". He goes on to say that she "works hard at being insouciant ... in comedy, however, there is a difference between being loose and being lazy ... her soi-disant material is unfocussed and defanged ... for all her rambling meshugaas, there is hardly a sustained idea or persuasive thought ... Bernhard seems to have almost nothing to say—only the power to say it venomously". He ends his review by opining, "since Bernhard's posture of knowingness lacks any traction of insight, the result is a noisy void".

Gwen Orel of Back Stage East wrote that Bernhard's show is "by turns embarrassing, mildly amusing, and sentimental ... it's interspersed with singing ... and she's backed by a great band ... but Bernhard is not blessed with great pipes. Her renditions of pop ballads are heartfelt but headache-inducing. Die-hard Bernhard fans will be disappointed; others, bored".

Jonathan Warman of The New York Blade was impressed with her singing writing that her show "has a selection of songs that compliments her voice beautifully ... Sandra's certainly a more powerful musical performer than the young ladies she frequently tweaks in her comedy". He goes on to opine that "there's not much that's truly bad about this show, and much that's beautiful ... I just found myself longing for more comedy--and general performance energy--that was as badass as the music".

The New York Times theater critic Charles Isherwood said "Bernhard's concerts have been getting less structured and more casual over the years, and this may just be her most offhand yet ... and the nutty eclecticism of her repertory compensates for her fairly artless, if ardent, singing". He complimented her for a "riff on a dream about a meeting between Rosa Parks and Condoleezza Rice as being hilarious", but then also notes that "some of her political material has gone stale ... it's a few minutes too late to be doing five minutes on Teresa Heinz Kerry". Overall though, he says that "since new stars seem to be cut from just a few bolts of the same bland cloth these days, it's invigorating just to be in the presence, once again, of a true original".

== Track listing ==
=== First edition ===
1. "Beautiful"
2. "De La Guarda / Broadway"
3. "L.A."
4. "Kerry / Laura Bush / Lynn Cheney"
5. "Condoleezza Rice & Rosa Parks"
6. "Pussycat"
7. "Motherhood"
8. "The Flame"
9. "Thanksgiving"
10. "Flint, Michigan"
11. "Bob Dylan"
12. "Like a Rolling Stone"
13. "Shabbat"
14. "Mariah Carey & Britney Spears"
15. "Sara"
16. "Out of Tears"
17. "Hugh Hefner"
18. "I Hate Golf / Mock the Poor"
19. "Just Like a Pill / Kiss Me Deadly"
20. "Christian Lady"
21. "Medley (My House / Nasty Girl / I Would Die 4 U)"

=== Enhanced version ===
1. "Beautiful"
2. "De La Guarda / Broadway"
3. "L.A."
4. "Kerry / Laura Bush / Lynn Cheney"
5. "Condoleezza Rice & Rosa Parks"
6. "Motherhood"
7. "The Flame"
8. "Thanksgiving"
9. "Flint, Michigan"
10. "Bob Dylan"
11. "Like a Rolling Stone"
12. "Shabbat"
13. "Mariah Carey & Britney Spears"
14. "Sara"
15. "Hugh Hefner"
16. "I Hate Golf / Mock the Poor"
17. "Pill / Kiss Me Deadly"
18. "Perfection"

Bonus video footage:

1. "Everything Bad and Beautiful" promo
2. "Sandra Bernhard: Live at Joe's Pub"

=== iTunes bonus tracks ===
1. "New York / Ali MacGraw"
2. "L.A. / Lenny Kravitz"
3. "Sandra Bernhard: Live at Joe's Pub"
