= List of business schools in Utah =

This is a list of business schools in Utah. Business schools are listed in alphabetical order by name. Schools named after people are alphabetized by last name. The AACSB International―The Association to Advance Collegiate Schools of Business is the oldest, largest, and most respected of the accreditation boards for business schools.

School	Parent	City	AACSB Accreditation
David Eccles School of Business	University of Utah	Salt Lake City	Yes
John B. Goddard School of Business & Economics	Weber State University	Ogden	Yes
Bill and Vieve Gore School of Business	Westminster University	Salt Lake City	Yes
Jon M. Huntsman School of Business	Utah State University	Logan	Yes
Marriott School of Management	Brigham Young University	Provo	Yes
School of Business	Southern Utah University	Cedar City	Yes
Udvar-Hazy School of Business	Utah Tech University	St. George	Yes
Woodbury School of Business	Utah Valley University	Orem	Yes
