= Randall Skanchy =

American judge from Utah

Randall Norman Skanchy (born November 11, 1952) is a Utah Third Judicial District judge for Salt Lake County, Utah in the Salt Lake City District Court. Skanchy was first appointed in January 2001, being retained in 2010.

== Biography ==
Judge Skanchy took his bachelor's degree from Weber State University and graduated in Law at Brigham Young University in 1980. His favorite hobby is fishing. He is married to Sue Zan Skanchy and has three children, two sons and a daughter. He also likes Civil War history, keeping a book with facts about that time.

A member of the Church of Jesus Christ of Latter-day Saints, Skanchy served a mission to Northern Italy, from 1973 to 1975, and has served in various callings in the Church.

== Legal activity ==
Judge Skanchy was appointed to the Third District Court in January 2001 by Gov. Michael O. Leavitt. On this court, he serves Salt Lake, Summit, and Tooele counties. At the time of the appointment, he was working as an attorney at Jones, Waldo, Holbrook & McDonough law firm, in Salt Lake City. He has 21 years of experience on litigation in civil and environmental causes, both in state and federal courts of law. Prior to the court appointment, Skanchy has served as an arbitrator for the National Association of Securities Dealers and dealt with federal and state environmental superfund matters throughout the western United States.

== Other activities ==
From 1996 to 1999, he was the head of the Utah Food Bank, and a member of the Community Services Council from 1996 to the year 2000. Besides working as a court judge, Judge Skanchy also works as an adjunct professor for the John B. Goddard School of Business & Economics at Weber State University, in Ogden, Utah. He is a member of the Utah Judicial Council's Ethics Advisory Committee and the Executive Committee of the Utah State Bar Litigation Committee and the Board of District Court Judges.

== Retention election ==
In 2010, Judge Skanchy was retained with 72.55% of the votes in the counties of Salt Lake, Tooele and Summit.

== Judicial activity ==
Judge Skanchy acts in many areas in the Third District Court, with a special mention to the Salt Lake Drug Court, in which he handles drug possession cases as well as drug trafficking cases. In November 2010, he participated in a graduation ceremony of a program designed for people who are addicted to drugs and gives education, counseling and a new hope for those people's lives. In the ceremony, Judge Skanchy said: "It's a battle, and it's an important battle to win. I know we're winning it not just for them but for their children, for their spouses, for their mothers and fathers." This program was remarkable because "at some point, really, it changes from us forcing them to want to do this to them embracing it and doing it." He also serves as a criminal judge for the Third District.
