= College of Health Professions =

College of Health Professions may refer to:

- A school at Rosalind Franklin University
- Towson University College of Health Professions
- New York College of Health Professions
- Dr. Ezekial R. Dumke College of Health Professions
- A school at Mercer University
- VCU College of Health Professions
