= Barry Mower =

American businessman

Barry Mower is an American businessperson and owner of Lifetime Products in Clearfield, Utah.

Mower graduated from Weber State College in 1974 with a bachelor's degree in microbiology. He started his first company, American Play World Company, in Riverdale, Utah, in 1973. In 1986, this company evolved into Lifetime Products, Inc. Today, Lifetime is a major manufacturer of tables and chairs, residential basketball equipment, sheds, playground equipment, kayaks and paddleboards, coolers, and raw steel products. Lifetime is based in Clearfield, Utah, and employs almost 2000 people worldwide. Mower holds more than 60 patents.

The Small Business Administration awarded Mower Small Businessman of the Year in 1990.

Mower currently lives in Layton, Utah.
