= TV tray table =

Collapsible portable furniture

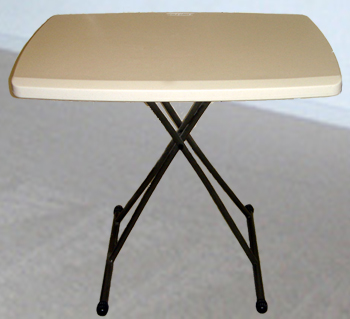
A Lifetime brand TV tray or personal table

A TV tray table, TV dinner tray, TV table, or personal table is a type of collapsible furniture that functions as a small and easily portable, folding table. These small tables were originally designed to be a surface from which one could eat a meal while watching television. The phrase tray-table can also refer to a fold-away tray, such as those found in front of airline seats.

TV tray tables became popular in the 1950s as a way to hold food and beverage items while watching TV, the iconic item being a TV dinner. National advertising for TV tray tables first appeared in 1952, a full year before Swanson introduced the TV dinner in October 1953. A set of four TV tables were sometimes sold mounted on a small rack where they could be hung when not in use. This rack was popularly placed in a corner of the living room.

The inventor of TV tray tables is unknown, but it may well be based on the Butler’s tray table. The original, popular models consisted of two pieces: a metal tray with grips mounted on its underside, and a set of tubular metal legs with rubberized tips at the bottom. The grips clipped on to the legs, which could be opened up to support the tray, or collapsed for stackable storage. The tray remained clipped to one leg support during storage.

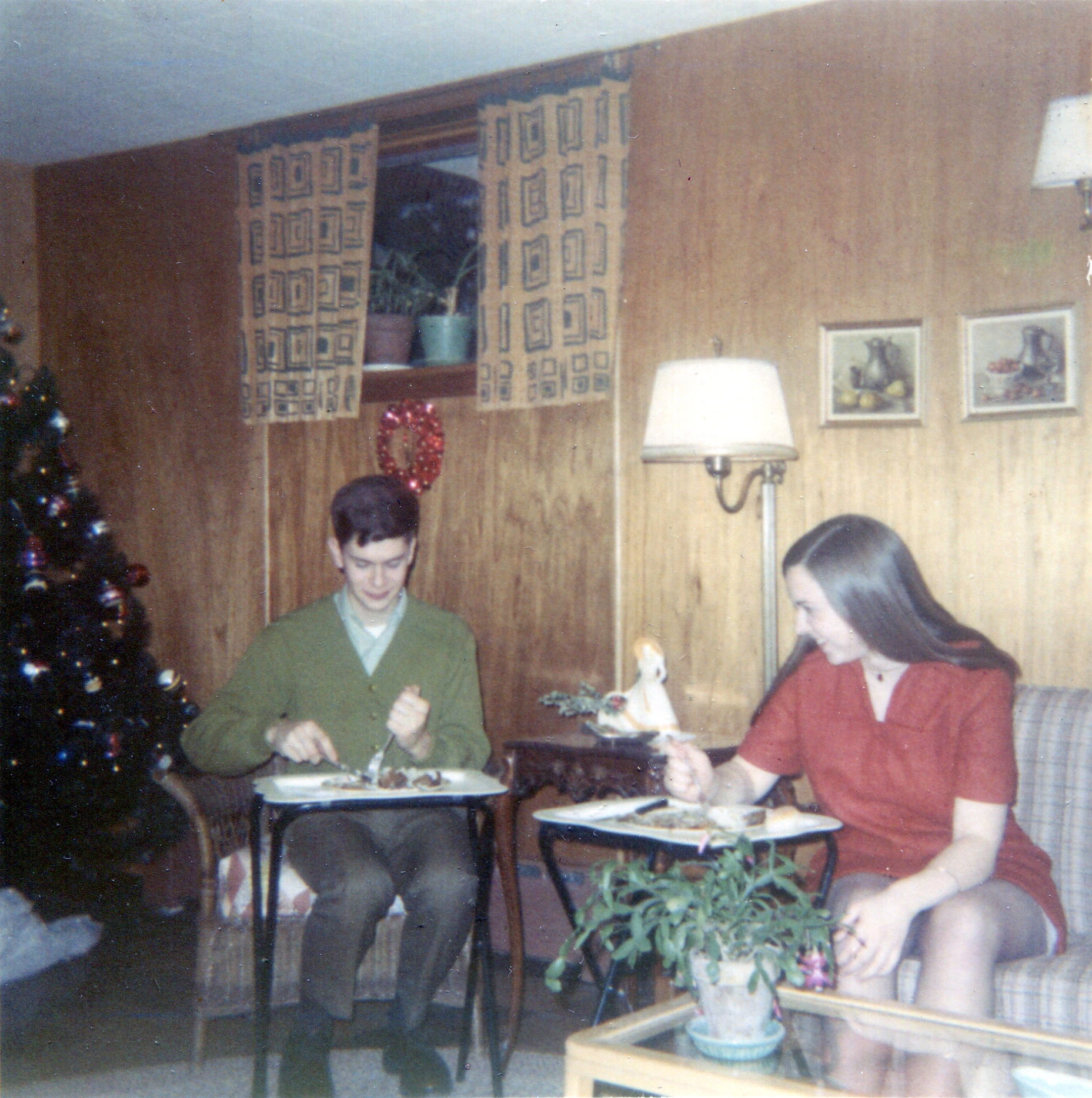
Two people eating dinner off of TV trays in basement rumpus room (1970)

As times changed, so did construction techniques, and today TV tray tables are often manufactured using wood or blow-molded plastic. It is now common for TV dinner trays to be marketed as "retro" or kitsch items.

== See also ==
- Serving cart
