= Freeport Center =

Manufacturing, warehousing, and distribution center in Clearfield, Utah

Coordinates: 41°05′52″N 112°01′50″W

- Formerly: Clearfield Naval Supply Depot
- Industry: distribution manufacturing warehousing
- Founded: 1942
- Headquarters: Clearfield, Utah
- Area served: United States
- Website: www.freeportcenter.com

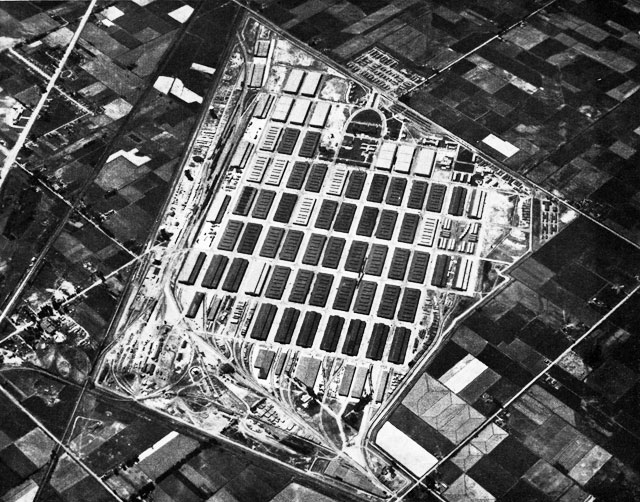
Aerial photograph of NSD Clearfield, the present location of Freeport Center.

The Freeport Center is a manufacturing, warehousing, and distribution center located in Clearfield, Utah. It was originally built in 1943 as the Clearfield Naval Supply Depot, which was decommissioned in 1962. A portion of the previous Naval Supply Depot (NSD) now exists as Clearfield Job Corps.

The Freeport Center's name is a reference to Utah's Freeport Law, enacted in 1966, which exempted inventory held for sale from property taxes.

== General ==
The 680-acre (280 ha) property consists of 78 buildings, totaling more than 7,000,000 square feet (650,000 m^{2}). Buildings range in size from 4,000 square feet (370 m^{2}) to 400,000 square feet (37,000 m^{2}). Most buildings have a railroad loading dock on one side, and a truck loading dock on the other. The property is served by the Union Pacific Railroad.

About 70 companies have manufacturing and distribution facilities in the Freeport Center, including Lifetime Products, Northrop Grumman, Don Julio Foods, and Utility Trailer Manufacturing Company. It is also the former headquarters of defunct roller coaster company Arrow Dynamics.

The Freeport Center is home to Northrop Grumman Aerospace Structures headquarters. The company produces various carbon composite parts and assemblies for both civil and military aircraft in its Aeronautics Composite Center Elevated (ACCE) and Freeport Composite Center (FCC) facilities.

Businesses in the Freeport Center employ approximately 7,000 people combined.

== History ==
Clearfield Naval Supply Depot, officially known as NSD Clearfield, was commissioned on April 10, 1943, by the United States Navy. The project was part of a broader effort to bolster the Navy's materiel supply chain following the Attack on Pearl Harbor. The Secretary of the Navy allocated funds for the site from Sixth Supplemental National Defense Appropriation Act 1942.

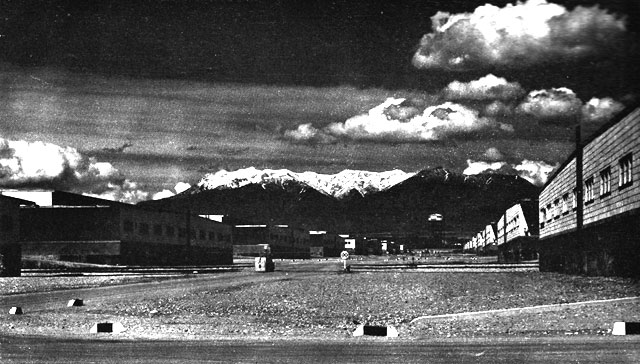
Storehouses at NSD Clearfield. The Wasatch Range can bee seen in the background.
