= John B. Goddard School of Business & Economics =

Business school at Weber State University

Coordinates: 41°11′38″N 111°56′42″W

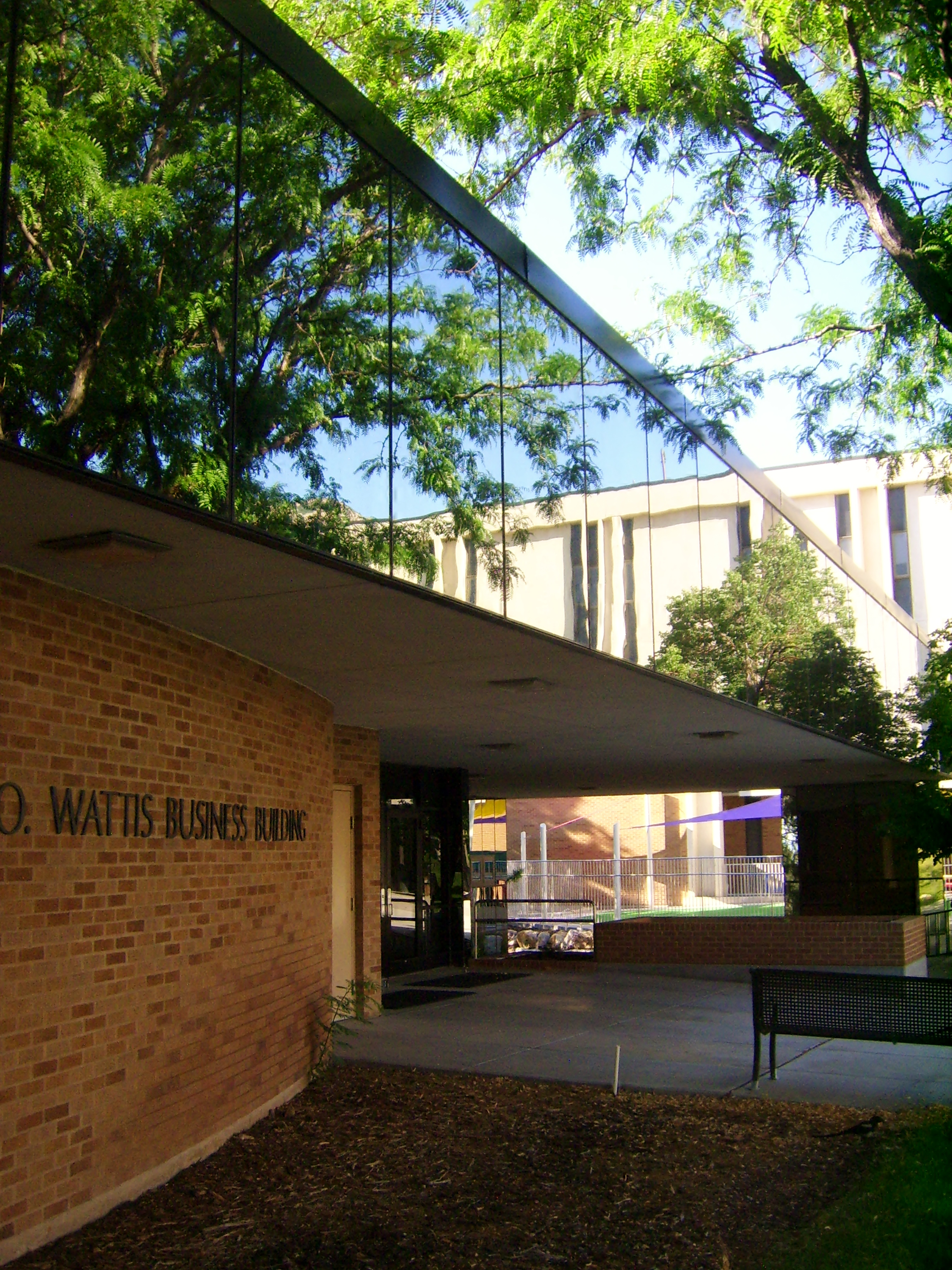
- Wattis Business Building, home of the John B. Goddard School of Business & Economics
- Type: Public business school
- Established: 1966
- Parent institution: Weber State University
- Endowment: over $14 million
- Dean: Doris Geide-Stevenson (interim)
- Faculty: 54
- Undergraduates: 2,400
- Postgraduates: 360
- Location: Ogden, Utah, United States
- Campus: 501 acres (WSU)
- Mascot: Waldo the Wildcat (WSU)
- Website: John B. Goddard School of Business & Economics

John B. Goddard School of Business & Economics is the business school of Weber State University, a public university in Ogden, Utah. It enrolls more than 2,400 undergraduate and more than 360 graduate students. The school was named for John B. Goddard following his more than $6 million gift in 1998.

== Notable alumni ==
- Nolan Archibald, former President & CEO, Black+Decker
- Dee Hock, founder, former CEO, Visa Inc.
- Nolan Karras, politician
- Damian Lillard, NBA player
- J. Willard Marriott, founder, Marriott International
- Barry Mower, owner, Lifetime Products
- Jerry Moyes, founder, former CEO, and chairman of the board, Swift Transportation

== See also ==
- List of business schools in the United States
