= Haven J. Barlow =

American politician (1922–2022)

Member of the Utah Senate from the 15th, 19th, 22nd district
- In office 1955–1994

Member of the Utah House of Representatives
- In office 1952–1955

Personal details
- Born: Haven Jesse Barlow; January 4, 1922 Clearfield, Utah, U.S.
- Died: February 6, 2022 (aged 100) Layton, Utah, U.S.
- Party: Republican
- Spouse: Bonnie Ellison (m. 1944; died 2002)
- Children: 6
- Profession: Real estate developer; politician

Haven Jesse Barlow (January 4, 1922 – February 6, 2022) was an American politician who was a Republican member of the Utah House of Representatives from 1952 to 1955 and Utah State Senate from 1955 to 1994. An alumnus of Utah State University and the Harvard Business School, and veteran of World War II where he served in the United States Navy, he was also the president and founder of Barlow Realty and Insurance. He was also a director of the Utah Symphony. Barlow served as president of the Utah Senate from 1967 to 1972.

Barlow turned 100 in January 2022, and died one month later on February 6, 2022.
