= Carla Taylor =

American basketball player and coach

Biographical details
- Born: April 29, 1961 (age 65)

Coaching career (HC unless noted)
- 1988–2011: Weber State

Head coaching record
- Overall: 308–341 (.475)

Accomplishments and honors

Awards
- 3x Big Sky Coach of the Year (1996, 2002, 2003)

Carla Taylor (born April 29, 1961) was the head women's basketball coach at Weber State University. In 23 seasons as a head coach, she has amassed a 308–341 record, including a 180–170 mark in Big Sky play. She owns the second most wins in Big Sky history. She was hired as one of the youngest college coach in the nation at age 26.

She played basketball at Weber State on the 1982 team that went to the WNIT tournament. She ranks 12th in school history in points scored with 1,122, and ninth in assists with 301.

In 2015, Taylor was honored by the Utah Sports Hall of Fame Foundation and was inducted as a Utah Coach of Merit at the spring induction banquet.
