= New York College of Health Professions =

Coordinates: 40.809405°N 73.516175°W

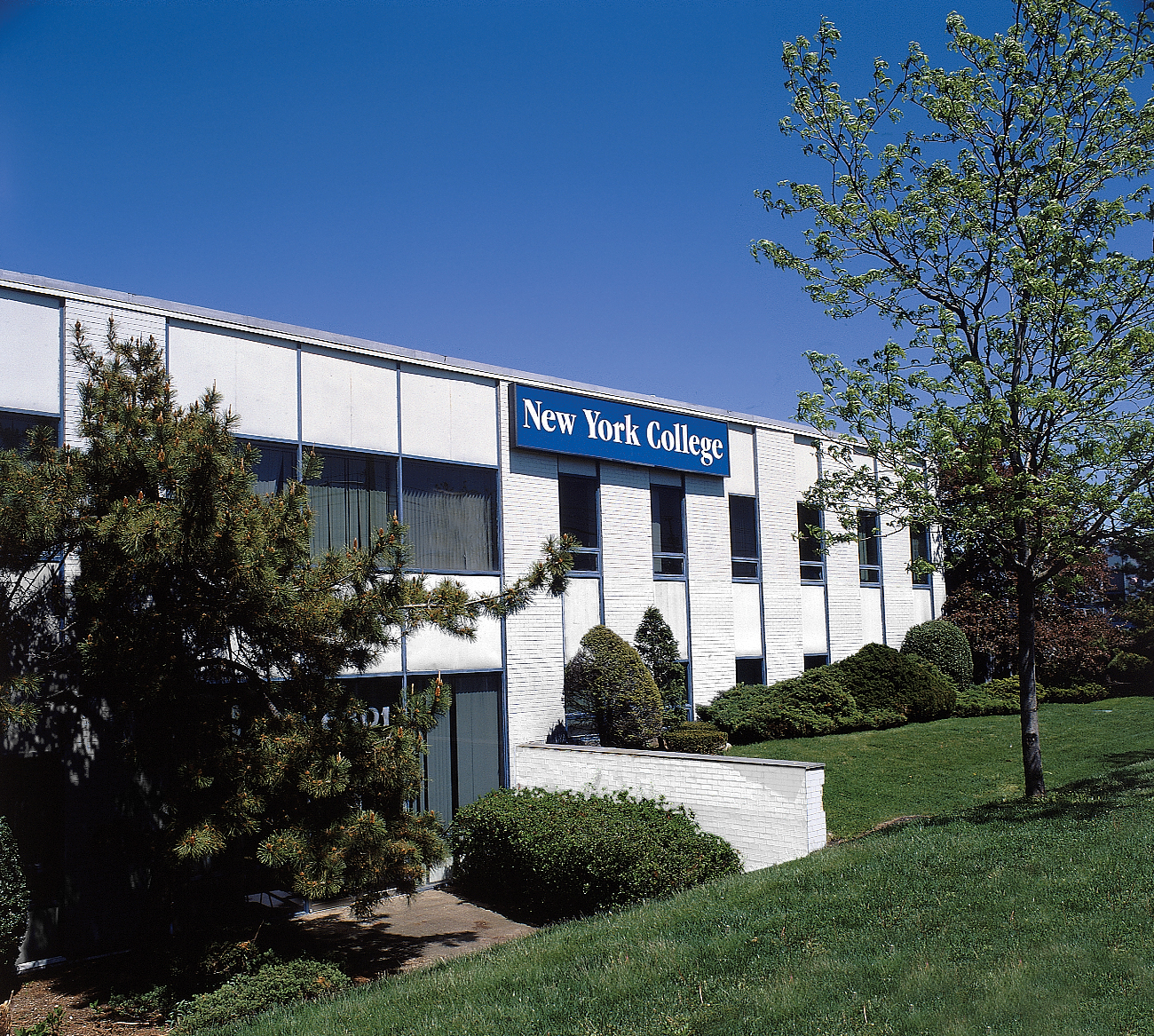
- NY College of Health Professions, Muttontown Campus
- Location: Muttontown, New York, United States
- Website: NYcollege.edu

The New York College of Health Professions is a private college focused on healthcare with its main campus in Muttontown, New York.

== History ==
The New York College of Health Professions was chartered in 1984 at Muttontown (the portion of the village which is served by Syosset Post Office). In 2004 the college was awarded a patent for Acupressure Clothing (U.S. Pat. 6,763,525 B1). It first applied to the New York State Board of Regents and the Commissioner of education for accreditation in October 2004. By 2006 it had 818 enrolled undergraduates. Throughout late 2006 and early 2007 the school was evaluated and the board voted unanimously to support accreditation for a three-year period ending in 2010. The board set for conditions that renewal would require the institution to strengthen governance, hire experienced faculty and add resources to the institutions research function. Today, the university is still accredited.

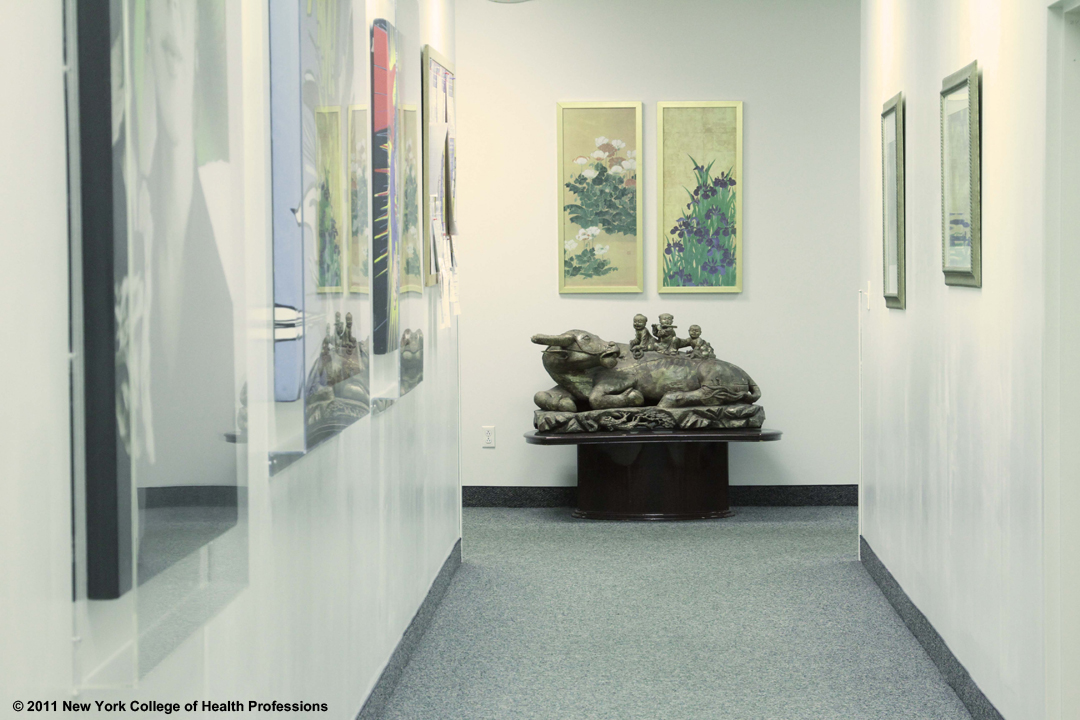
Art objects donated to New York College adorn hallways and reception areas.

== Locations ==
The main campus, on Long Island in Muttontown, New York has a 70,000 square foot facility with classrooms and teaching clinics. The school also has locations in Manhattan on the upper west side, University Settlement in the SoHo/ Chinatown area, and the NY Open Center in midtown.

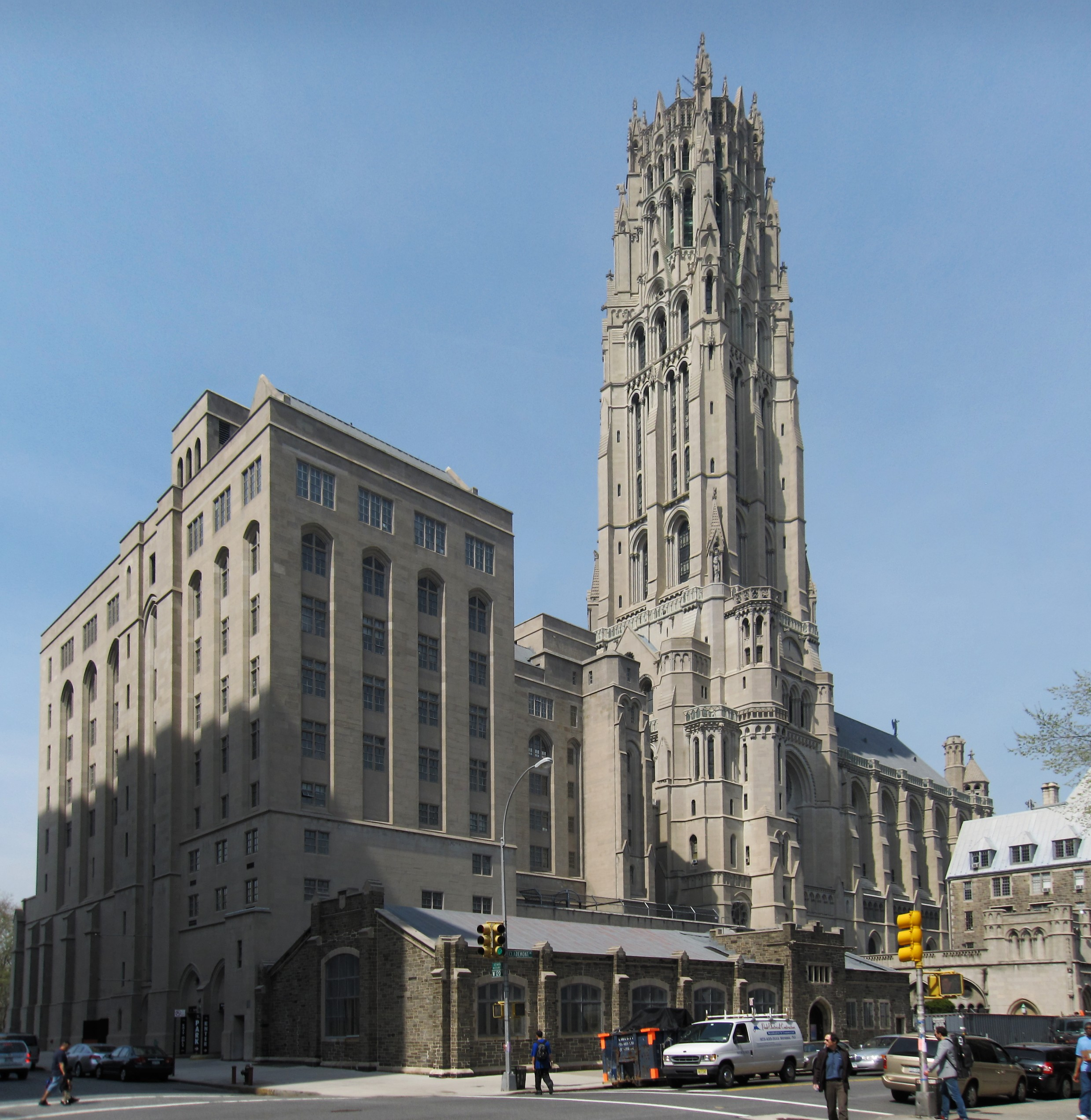
The Riverside Church, Manhattan's Upper West Side

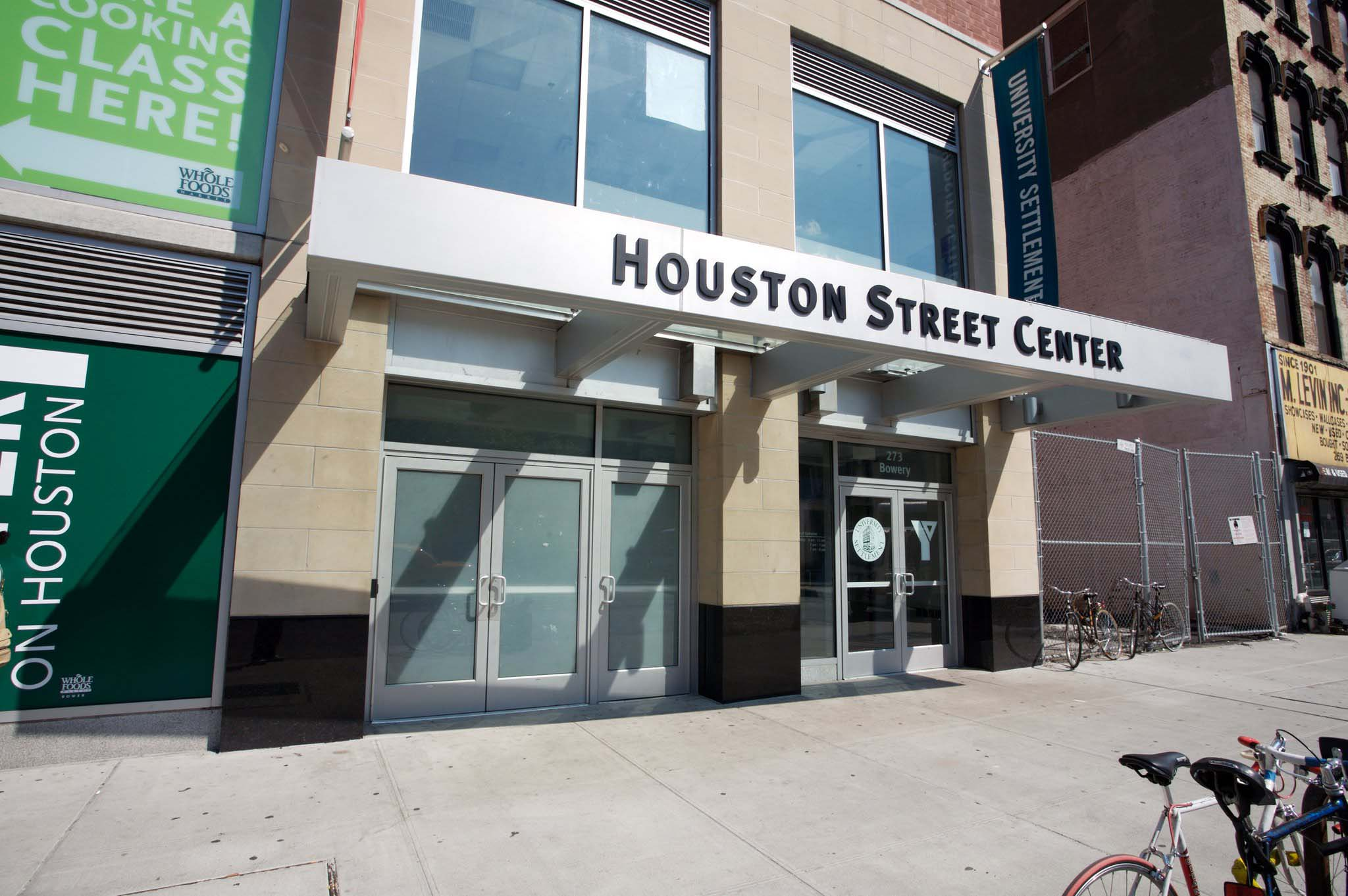
University Settlement, Manhattan's SOHO/Chinatown area

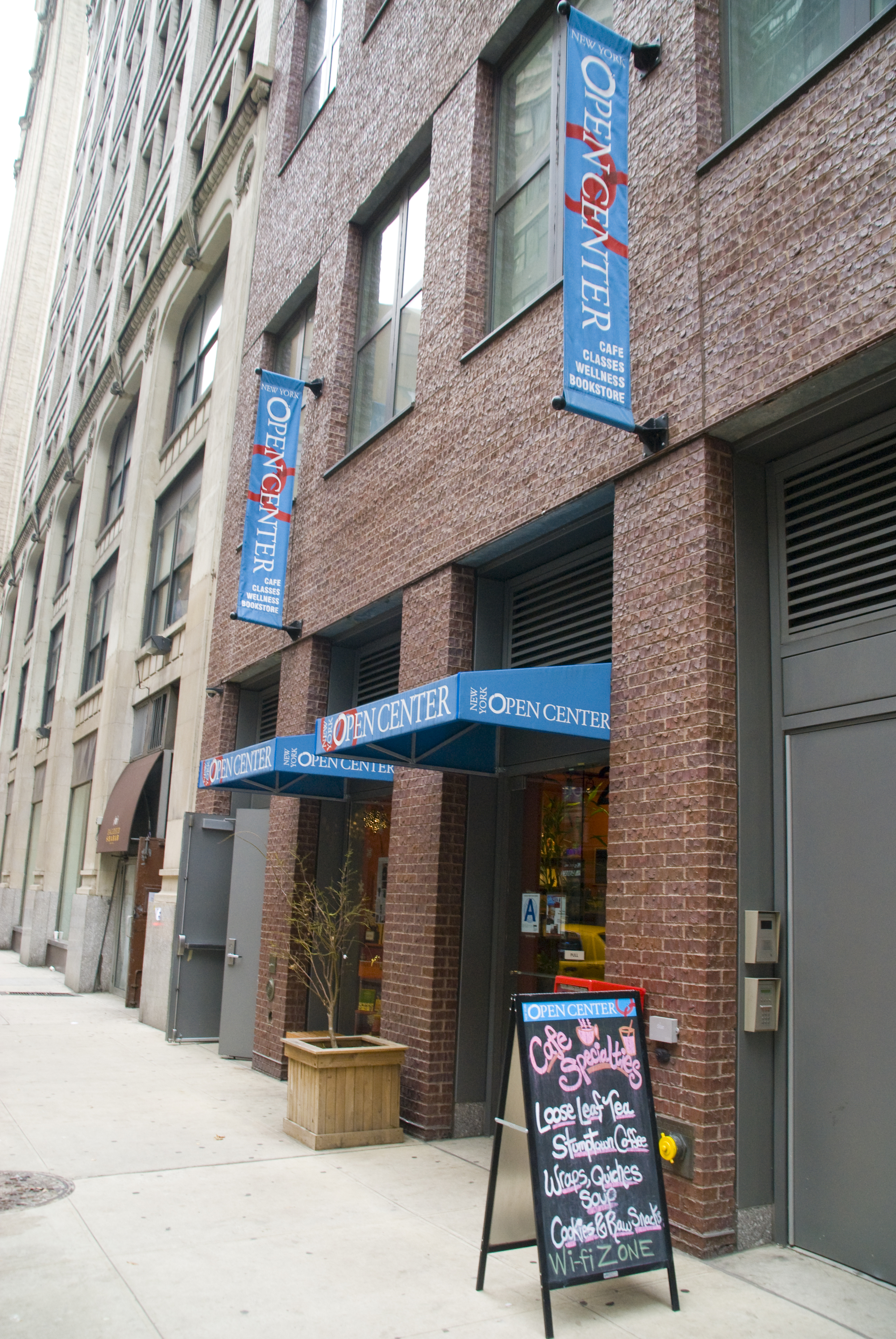
New York Open Center, Midtown, Manhattan

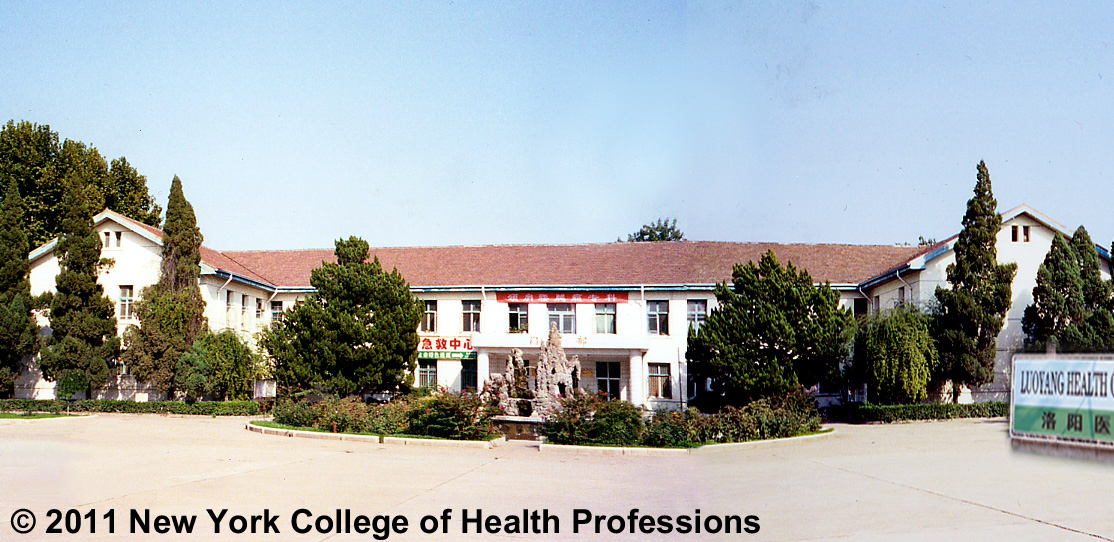
Facility in Lou Yang China owned by New York College of Health Professions

== Academics ==
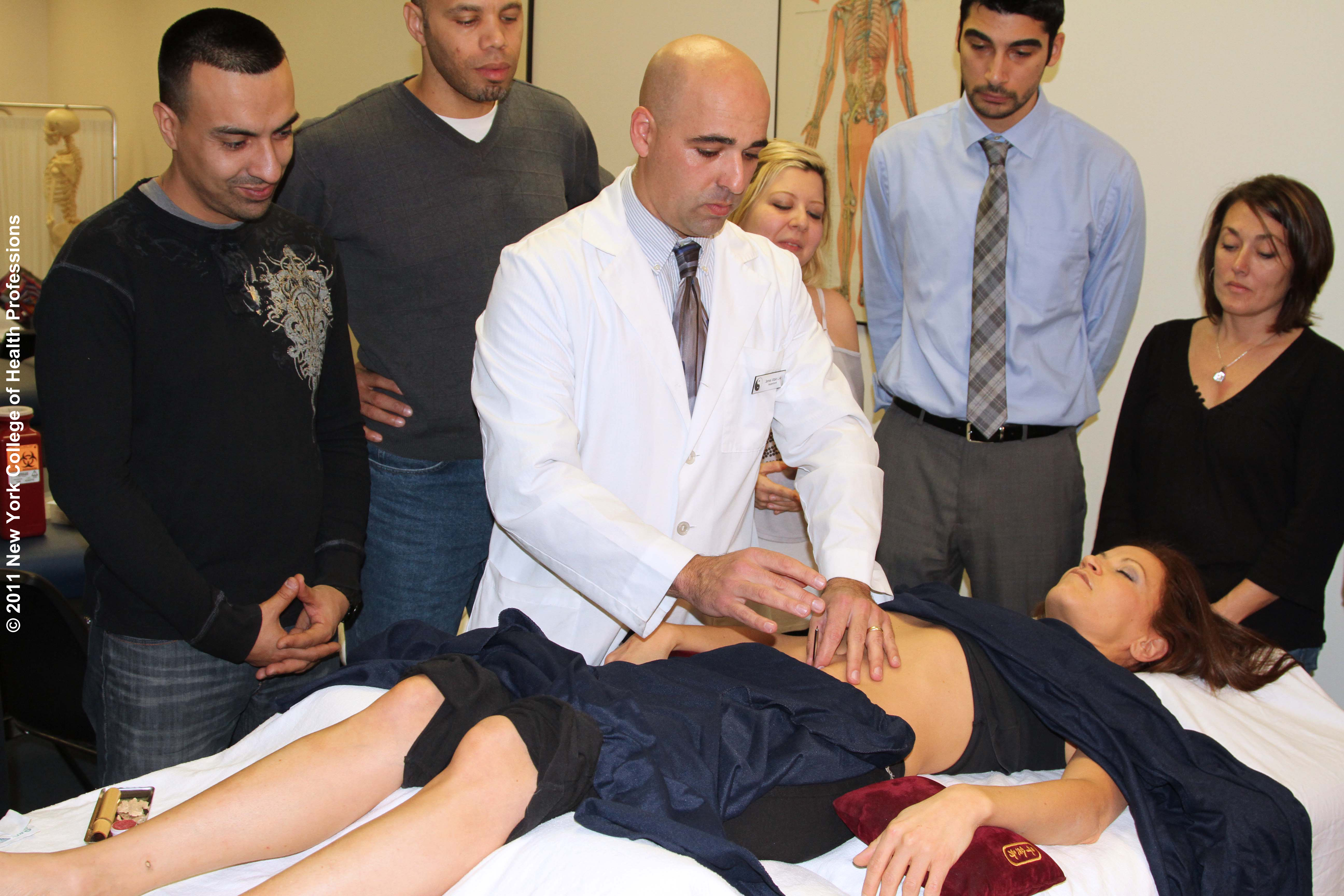
Clinical demonstration of acupuncture

The school offers associate, bachelor's, and master's degrees.

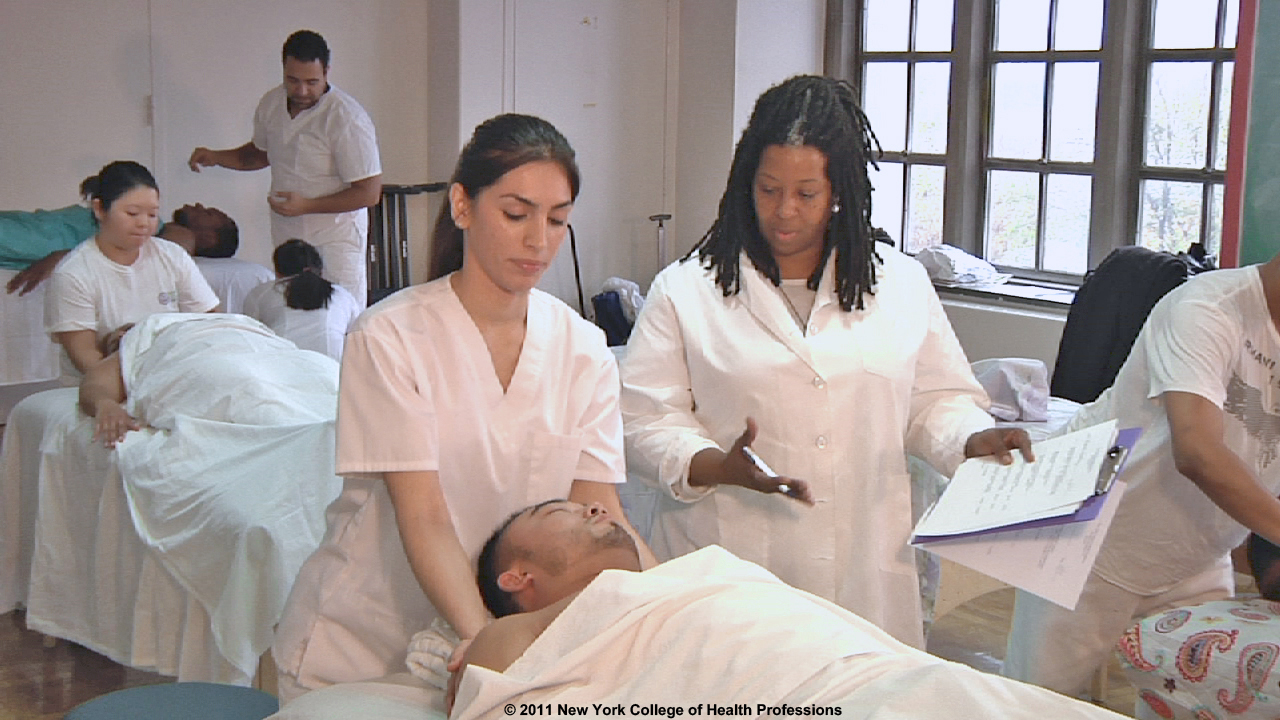
Massage Therapy class at The Riverside Church

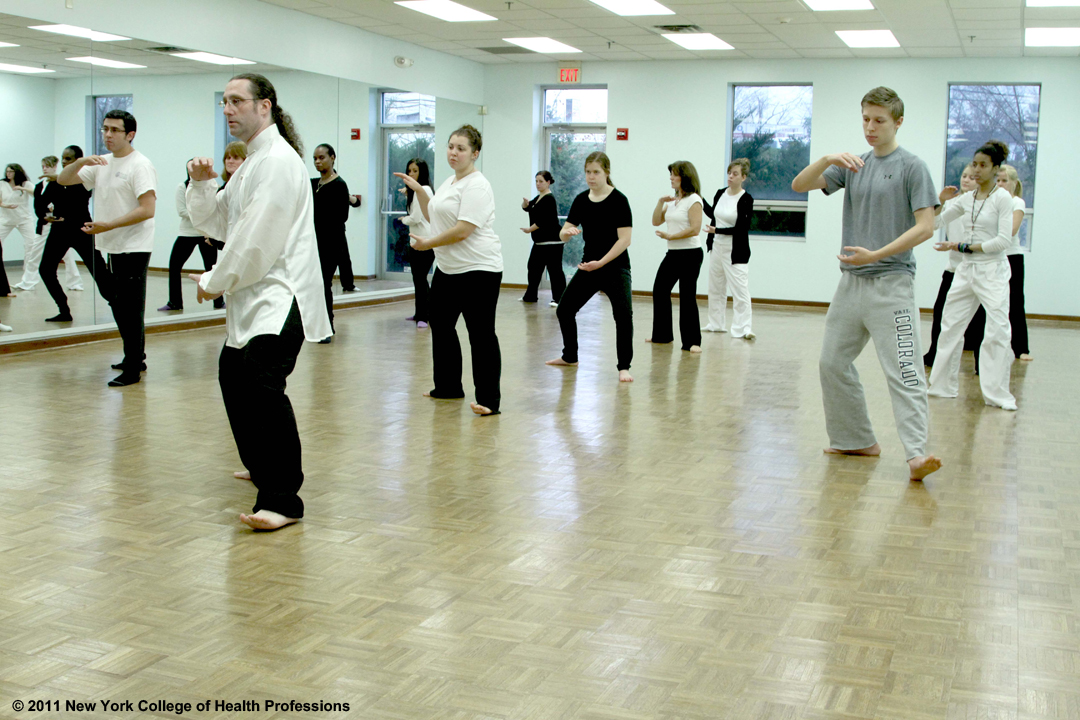
T'ai Chi class held at the Muttontown campus

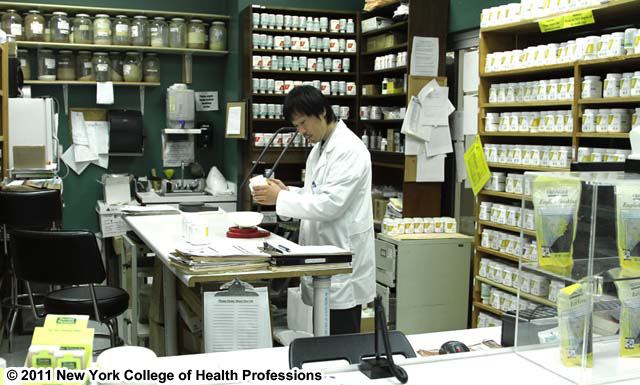
New York College Herbal Dispensary at the Muttontown campus

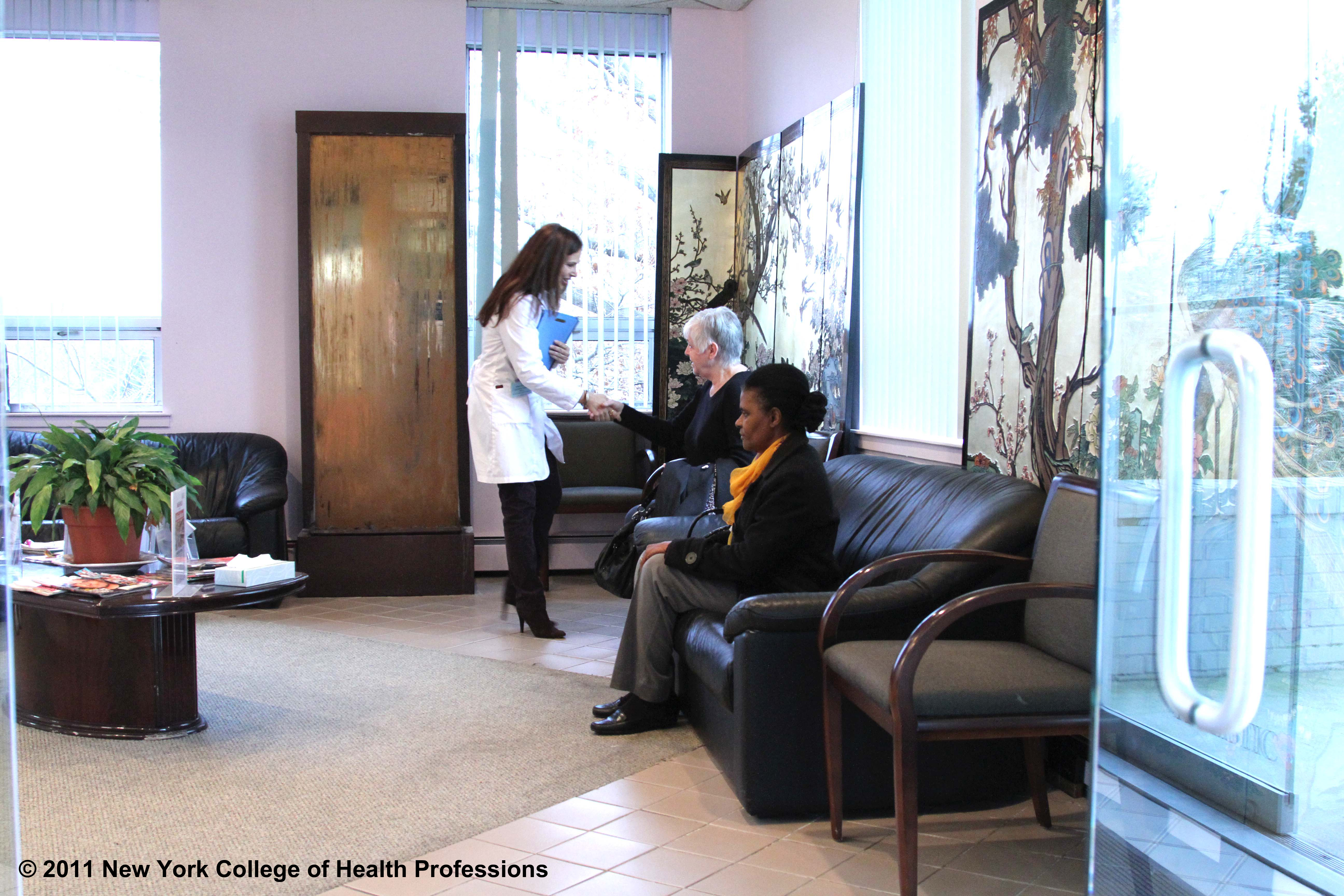
Clinic reception area at New York College of Health Professions Holistic Health Care Center in Muttontown, NY
