= Lifetime Products =

American company

Coordinates: 41°5′46″N 112°1′38″W

- Type: Private
- Founded: March 1986; 40 years ago
- Headquarters: Clearfield, Utah, U.S.
- Key people: BJ Haacke, President & CEO; Vince Rhoton (Chief Sales and Marketing Officer)
- Products: folding chairs folding tables basketball systems coolers sheds kayaks and paddleboards lawn and garden items fabricated steel products blow-molded plastic items
- Number of employees: 2,200 worldwide
- Website: www.Lifetime.com

Lifetime Products Inc. is a privately owned company founded in 1986. Its main products are blow-molded polyethylene folding chairs and tables, picnic tables, home basketball equipment, sheds, coolers, kayaks and paddleboards, and lawn and garden items, along with OEM steel and plastic items from other companies.

== Overview ==
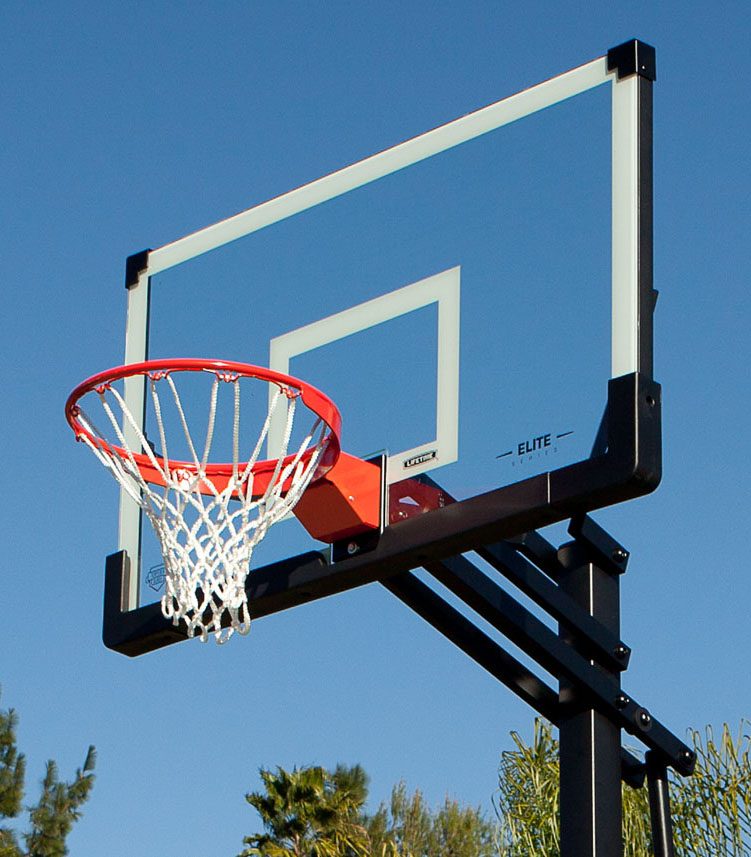
Lifetime Elite Basketball System

Lifetime Products uses polyethylene blow molding and metal forming technology to create a variety of consumer and industrial products. Lifetime has a large single-point blow molding plastics facility in Clearfield, Utah, occupying 2,200,000 square feet (200,000 m^{2}), and employs over 2,200 people worldwide. The company produces the only folding chair to comply with the Business and Institutional Furniture Manufacturer's Association (BIFMA), which defines durability standards testing of commercial-grade chairs. Lifetime is headquartered in the Freeport Center in Clearfield, Utah, and has vertically integrated manufacturing facilities in Clearfield, Xiamen, China, and Mascot, Tennessee. US distribution facilities are located in North Kansas City, Missouri, and Columbus, Ohio. International distribution facilities are in Monterrey, Mexico and Lille, France.

== History ==
In 1972, Lifetime Product's founder, Barry Mower, made a sturdier basketball pole for his backyard using pipe, plywood, and a basketball rim. Seeing the potential in what he had constructed, he placed an ad in the local classifieds and made his first sale.

His business eventually became a sporting goods store, and in March 1986, became Lifetime Products, a name inspired by the goal of building durable and lasting products. Shortly after, the research and design staff created and patented the "Quick Adjust" basketball system, which allowed users to adjust residential basketball rims from 7.5 to 10 feet.

In its first three years, the company grew to 167 employees and occupied 120,000 square feet (11,000 m^{2}) of manufacturing, office, and warehouse space. New equipment, including an electrostatic powder coating operation and a robotic rim welding system, was installed to keep up with demand. A metal fabrication department was also formed to constantly update and improve presses and dies.

Utilizing its expertise in plastics and metals, Lifetime then developed a blow-molded folding picnic table in 1995, a folding banquet table in 1998, and a steel-reinforced blow-molded shed in 2005.

In May 2010, Lifetime acquired the assets of Dragonfly Innovation Corp., a producer of blow-molded kayaks, and kayak production was moved to Lifetime's facilities in Utah. In November 2011, Lifetime acquired Pennsylvania-based Emotion Kayaks, making Lifetime one of the largest kayak manufacturers in the world.

In August 2017, the company expanded US operations by opening a 700,000+ square foot east coast manufacturing and distribution facility in Mascot, TN just east of Knoxville, TN.This new facility will produce Lifetime’s line of water sports products including kayaks and paddleboards, as well as their outdoor Play System line of products. With this new location for manufacturing and distribution, Lifetime will be able to meet its customers’ increasing demand for products with shortened supply chains and faster shipping times.

On July 6, 2024 the CEO of Lifetime Products, Richard Hendrickson and his daughter Sally, were killed in an automobile accident in Ogden Canyon after their vehicle collided with a bulldozer that had fallen off a truck while being transported.

== Products ==
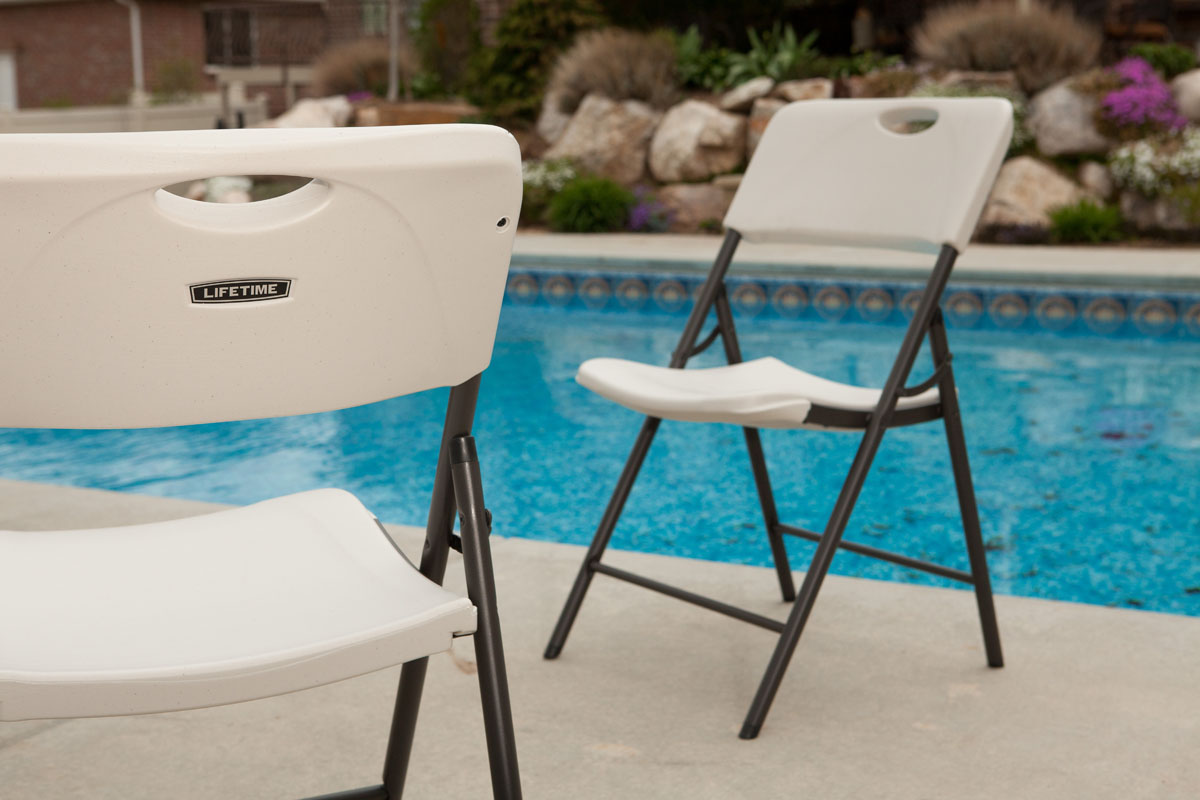
Lifetime Folding Chairs

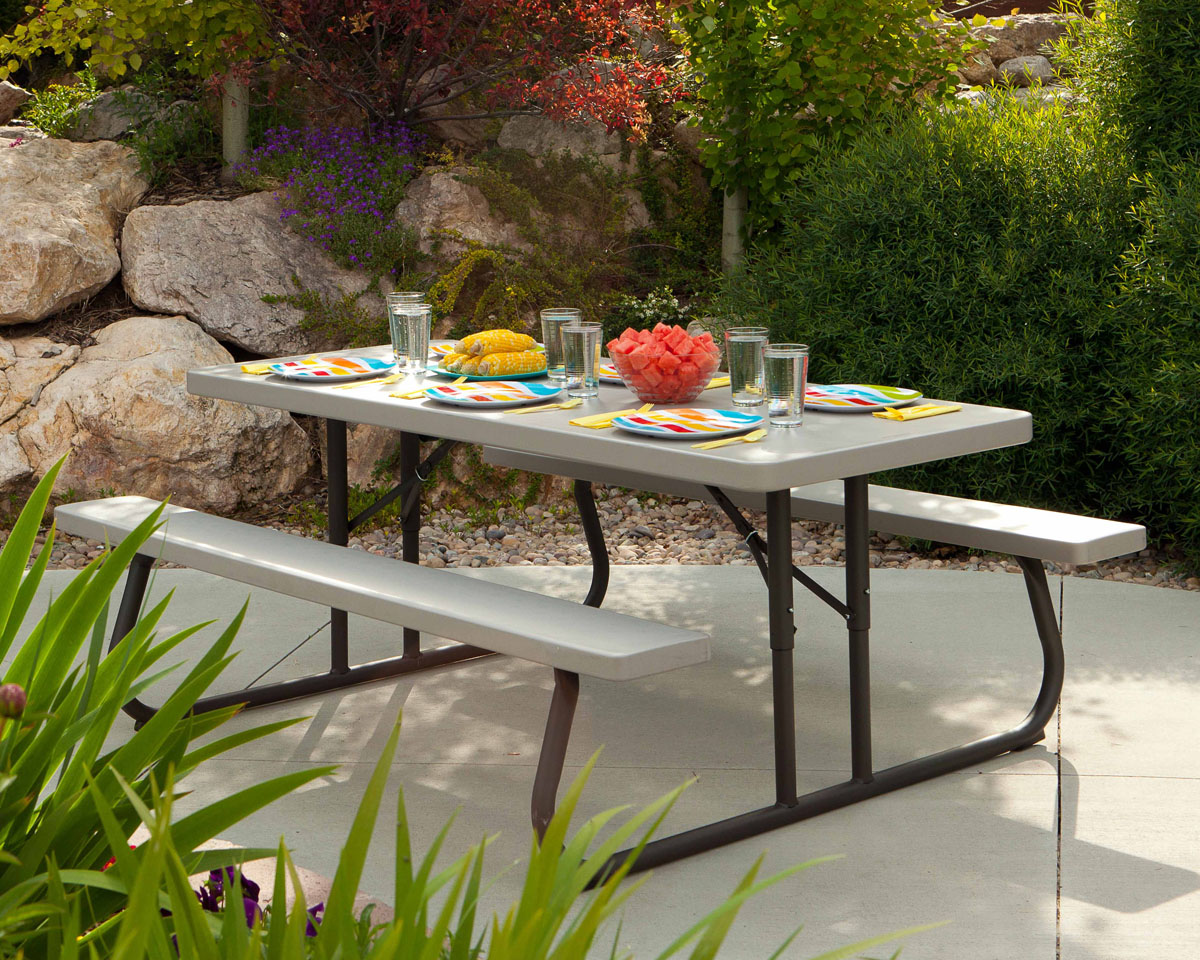
Lifetime Picnic Table

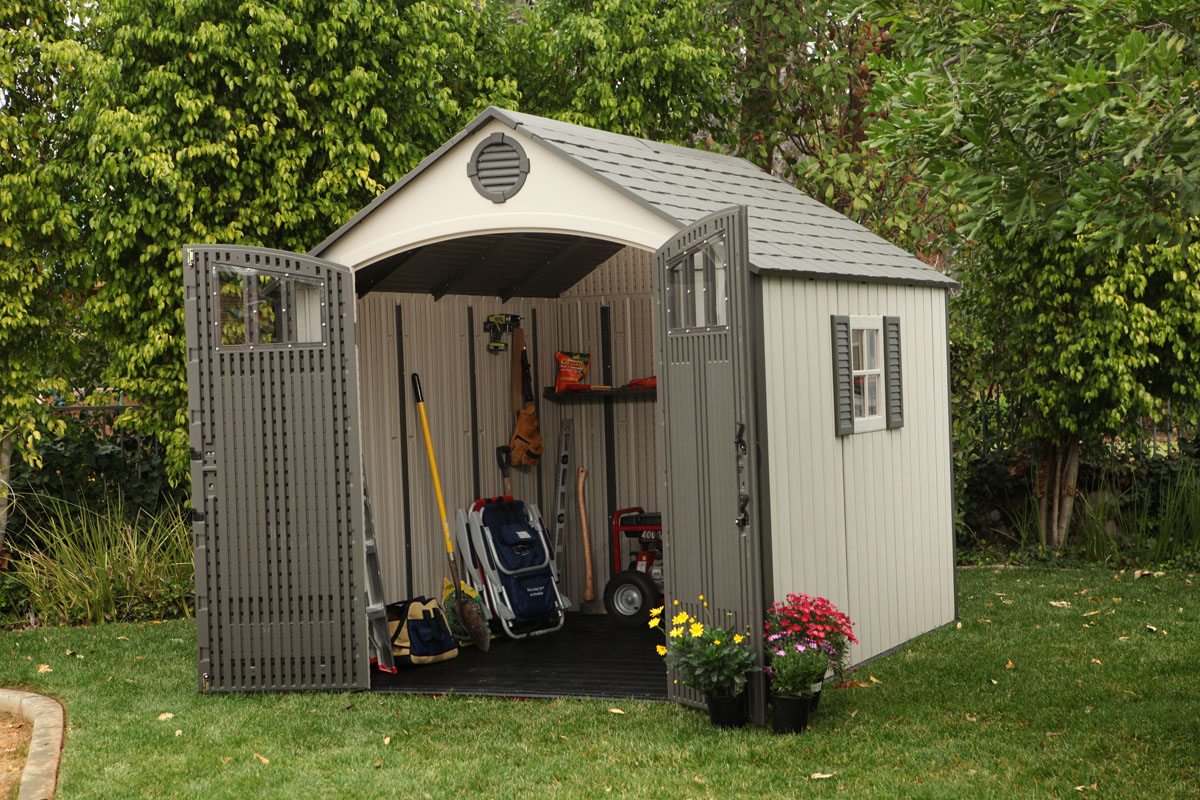
Lifetime Storage Shed

=== Tables and chairs ===
- Folding Chair
- Stacking Chair
- Folding tables
- Round tables
- Personal tables
- Picnic tables
- Camp and sport tables

=== Basketball systems ===
- Portable Residential Basketball Systems
- In-ground Residential Basketball Systems
- Bolt-down Residential Basketball Systems
- Adjustable-Height Basketball Systems (portable, in-ground, and bolt-down)
- Rim and Backboard Stationary Combinations

=== Sheds ===
- Storage buildings
- Storage sheds
- Garden sheds
- Extension kits and accessories

=== Lawn and garden ===
- Yard cart
- Wheelbarrow
- Compost tumbler
- Glider bench
- Deck box

=== Playground equipment ===
- Outdoor playsets
- Teeter-totters
- Dome climbers
- Swing sets
- Tetherball set

=== Kayaks ===
- Sit-on-top Kayaks
- Sit-Inside Kayaks
- Youth Kayaks
- Paddleboards

=== Coolers ===
- 5 gallon water cooler
- 28 quart cooler
- 48 quart cooler
- 55 quart cooler
- 65 quart cooler
- 77 quart cooler
- 115 quart cooler

== Lifetime Metals ==
Lifetime Metals produces processed steel items for both Lifetime Products, and for other manufacturers in the region. Services provided include coil slitting and leveling, shearing, stamping with Minster machine presses, tube mill operations, roll forming, and other processes.

== Lifetime Store ==
Lifetime owns and operates the retail chain Lifetime Store, formerly called Backyards Inc., which is a factory outlet for Lifetime Products carrying both new and seconds, or blemished products. There are seven store locations in Utah and Idaho.

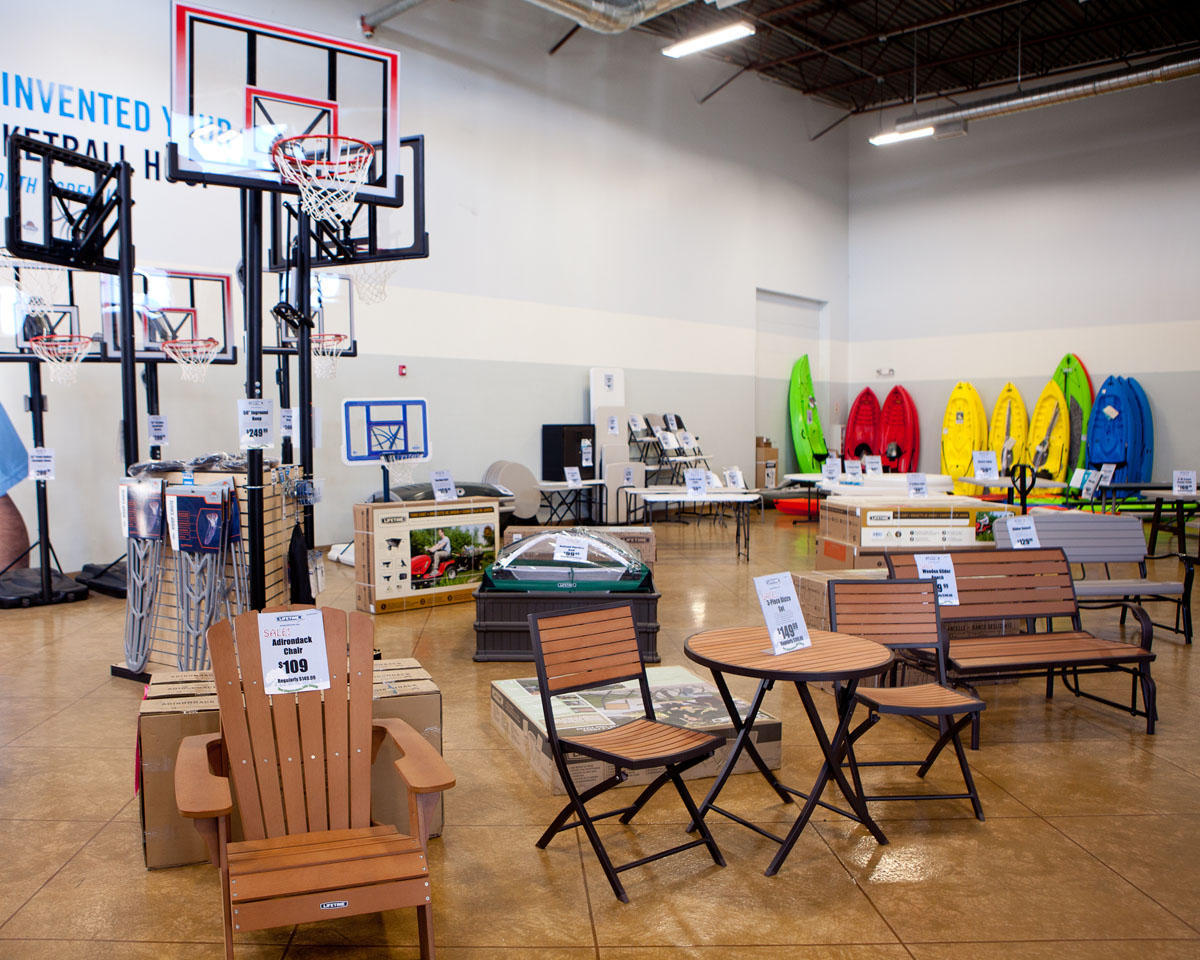
The Lifetime Store

== Patents and innovations ==
- 1986 – Introduced and patented the first adjustable basketball pole on the market
- 1992 – Introduced its line of portable basketball systems
- 1992 – Invented and patented the friction weld joint for basketball poles
- 1993 – Invented a blow-molded base that is airtight and watertight
- 1995 – Invented blow-molded polyethylene tabletops
- 1995 – Invented a fully assembled, folding picnic table
- 1996 – Invented the Power Lift, the first one-hand, pneumatic height adjustment mechanism
- 1998 – Introduced blow-molded polyethylene folding banquet tables
- 2000 – Introduced the only folding chair to meet or exceed BIFMA standards
- 2001 – Introduced Mammoth Basketball Equipment, a line of professional-quality home basketball systems
- 2004 – Introduced the Shatter Proof Backboard, the first virtually unbreakable backboard made with Makrolon polycarbonate
- 2005 – Introduced its multi-branded line of outdoor storage sheds
- 2006 – Introduced an innovative new line of steel utility trailers
- 2007 – Introduced its line of residential playground equipment
- 2008 – Introduced a line of residential garden products
- 2010 – Invented a low cost tent trailer that carries an all-terrain vehicle
- 2010 – Acquired Dragonfly Innovations, expanding its offerings to include kayaks
- 2011 – Acquired Emotion Kayaks, making Lifetime one of the largest kayak manufacturers in the world
- 2015 – Acquired LightHeaded Beds, LLC.
- 2018 – Introduced a line of coolers
