= Dr. Ezekiel R. Dumke College of Health Professions =

Health sciences college of Weber State University

Coordinates: 41°11′32″N 111°56′31″W

The Dr. Ezekiel R. Dumke College of Health Professions is the health sciences college of Weber State University, a public university in Ogden, Utah. It is in the Marriott Allied Health building on the east side of campus south of the Science Lab building.
