= Clearfield, Utah =

City in Utah, United States

- City
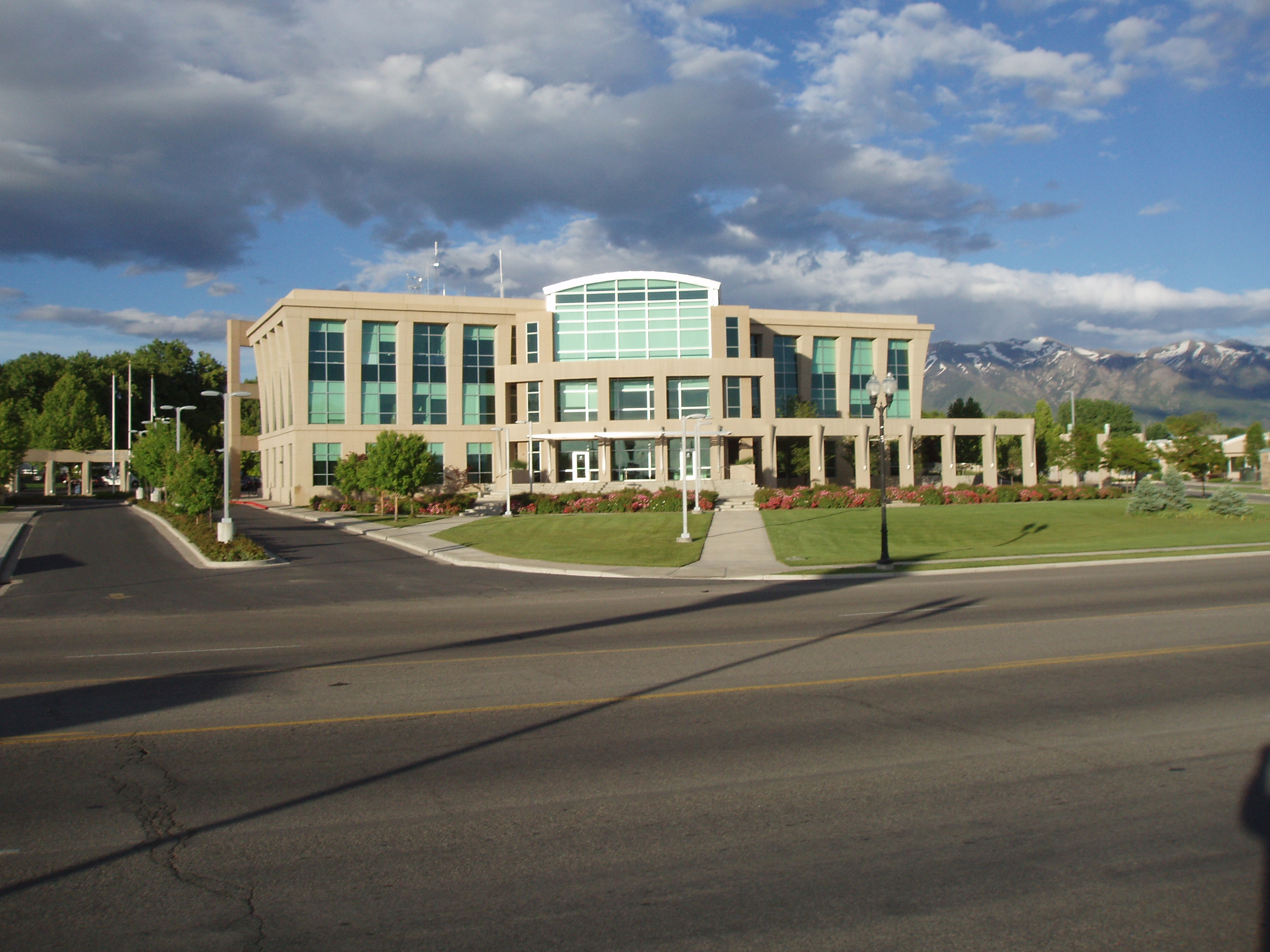
- Clearfield City Municipal and Justice Center
- Motto: We've Got it Made
- Location in Davis County and the state of Utah.
- Coordinates: 41°06′23″N 112°01′27″W
- Country: United States
- State: Utah
- County: Davis
- Settled: 1877
- Incorporated: July 17, 1922
- Incorporated (city): March 21, 1946
- Founded by: Richard and Emily Hamblin

Area
  - Total: 7.75 sq mi (20.06 km^{2})
  - Land: 7.71 sq mi (19.98 km^{2})
  - Water: 0.031 sq mi (0.08 km^{2})
- Elevation: 4,442 ft (1,354 m)

Population (2020)
  - Total: 31,909
  - Density: 4,136/sq mi (1,597/km^{2})
- Time zone: UTC−7 (Mountain (MST))
  - Summer (DST): UTC−6 (MDT)
- ZIP codes: 84015, 84016, 84089
- Area codes: 385, 801
- FIPS code: 49-13850
- GNIS feature ID: 2409478
- Website: https://clearfield.city/

Clearfield is a city in Davis County, Utah, United States. The population was 31,909 at the 2020 census. The city grew rapidly during the 1940s, with the formation of Hill Air Force Base, and in the 1950s with the nationwide increase in suburb and "bedroom" community populations and has been steadily growing since then.

Clearfield is a principal city of the Ogden-Clearfield metropolitan area, which includes all of Davis, Morgan, and Weber counties.

== History ==
Clearfield was settled in 1877 by Richard and Emily Hamblin and was originally called Sand Ridge. In 1869, the Utah Central Railroad was built through the area that would latter become the settlement.

There was no water for those early families until wells could be successfully dug. The only water available at first had to be hauled in large barrels from Kays Creek in East Layton. But the great event that did more to transform the bleak Sand Ridge into a fertile garden spot was the coming of the Davis and Weber Counties Canal in 1884. This caused an immediate population boom in the area as people plowed up the sagebrush and cactus, and homes and farms began to appear throughout the area.

Many Clearfield children went to school nearby in Syracuse by walking several miles a day. In 1907, the new Clearfield Elementary School opened its doors to those same children. The school taught first through eighth grades and operated until 1923, when it was destroyed by fire. The new building later acquired the name Pioneer School. North Davis Junior High School was built and opened its doors in 1939. The building cost approximately $170,000 to build. That first year, there were 18 faculty members and 585 students.

Throughout the following years, Clearfield was known as a peaceful farming community. However, the addition of defense installations in the areas changed the agricultural community. Construction began on Hill Field (Hill Air Force Base) in 1940, and the facility eventually stretched along the eastern border of Clearfield. The base has since provided many jobs for civilians and is one of Utah's major employers.

On the southwestern side of Clearfield, the U.S. Navy installed the Clearfield Naval Supply Depot in 1943 to support the Pacific Fleet during World War II. Clearfield was chosen for the depot because of its relative security from enemy attack, nearby air transportation at Hill Air Force Base, and the proximity of major railroads and highways. The proposed depot would also be equidistant from the Seattle, San Francisco, and Los Angeles ports. The dry climate was ideal for storage, and there was a supply of manpower because northern Utah had higher unemployment rates than other industrialized areas.

Another more modern school, South Clearfield Elementary, was added in 1950 to help keep pace with the growing population.

The early winter of 1959 saw the beginnings of Clearfield High School, the first high school in northern Davis County.

The Clearfield Naval Supply Depot was eventually phased out by 1962, but the facility did not stay empty for long. Private firms soon began moving into the large warehouse buildings. The area became known as the Freeport Center and is a major western hub for manufacturing, warehousing, and distribution.

Hill Field Elementary opened in 1963 and is located just west of the west border of Hill Air Force Base.

The Clearfield Job Corps Center was established in 1966. This facility is located west of the Freeport Center on Antelope Drive. It was established to train unemployed and unskilled youth 16 to 24 years old.

Clearfield City dedicated a new city hall building in 1969, and a new state-of-art Clearfield Fire Station opened in 1980, adjacent to city hall.

In 1981, Holt Elementary opened in the northwest corner of the city, near Steed Park.

The newest Clearfield City Municipal Building, located on 55 South State Street, was dedicated in December 1999.

Clearfield's premier office and commercial center, Legend Hills, is also the largest office development space in north Davis County. The first phase of Legend Hills was built in 2002 on the city's east side, just east of the frontage road along Interstate 15.

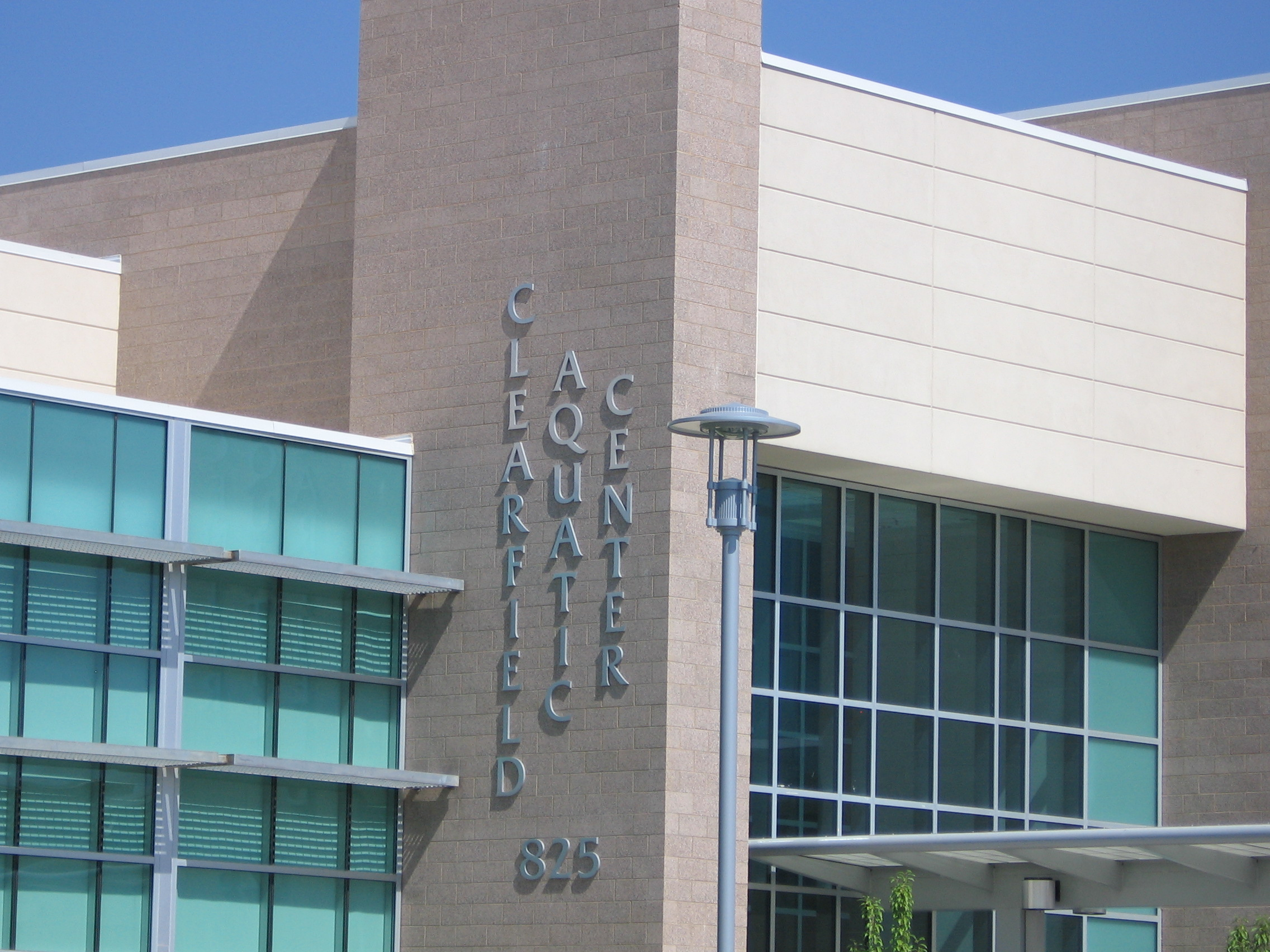
Clearfield Aquatic Center, built in 2006

In 2004, ground was broken for the Clearfield Aquatic Center. In 2005, the old Clearfield City Swimming Pool was demolished to make way for the new center and for an updated Bernard Fisher Park. The new skate park at Fisher Park was also added the same year. The Clearfield Aquatic Center opened in 2005 adjacent to the newly built North Davis Junior High, which until 2005 had been the oldest standing junior high building in Davis County. An outdoor splash pad feature was added to the Clearfield Aquatic Center in 2006.

Clearfield High School underwent a major renovation in 2006, including the main auditorium and computer upgrades.

The opening of the Utah Transportation Association (UTA) FrontRunner commuter rail stop in Clearfield in 2008 helped the city emerge as a centralized location of business, public, and community development.

Davis County opened a three-story, 45,000-square-foot office building housing the administrative offices of the Davis County Health Department in 2010. The Heritage Senior Activity Center closed its Clearfield Community Center location in 2011. It reopened as the North Davis Senior Center in its new location adjacent to the new county health building.

In 2012, the former Clearfield Community Center was renamed, becoming the Clearfield Community Arts Center. Located east of the Clearfield City Municipal Building north parking lot, the center is expected to become a hub for art classes, theatre productions, and more.

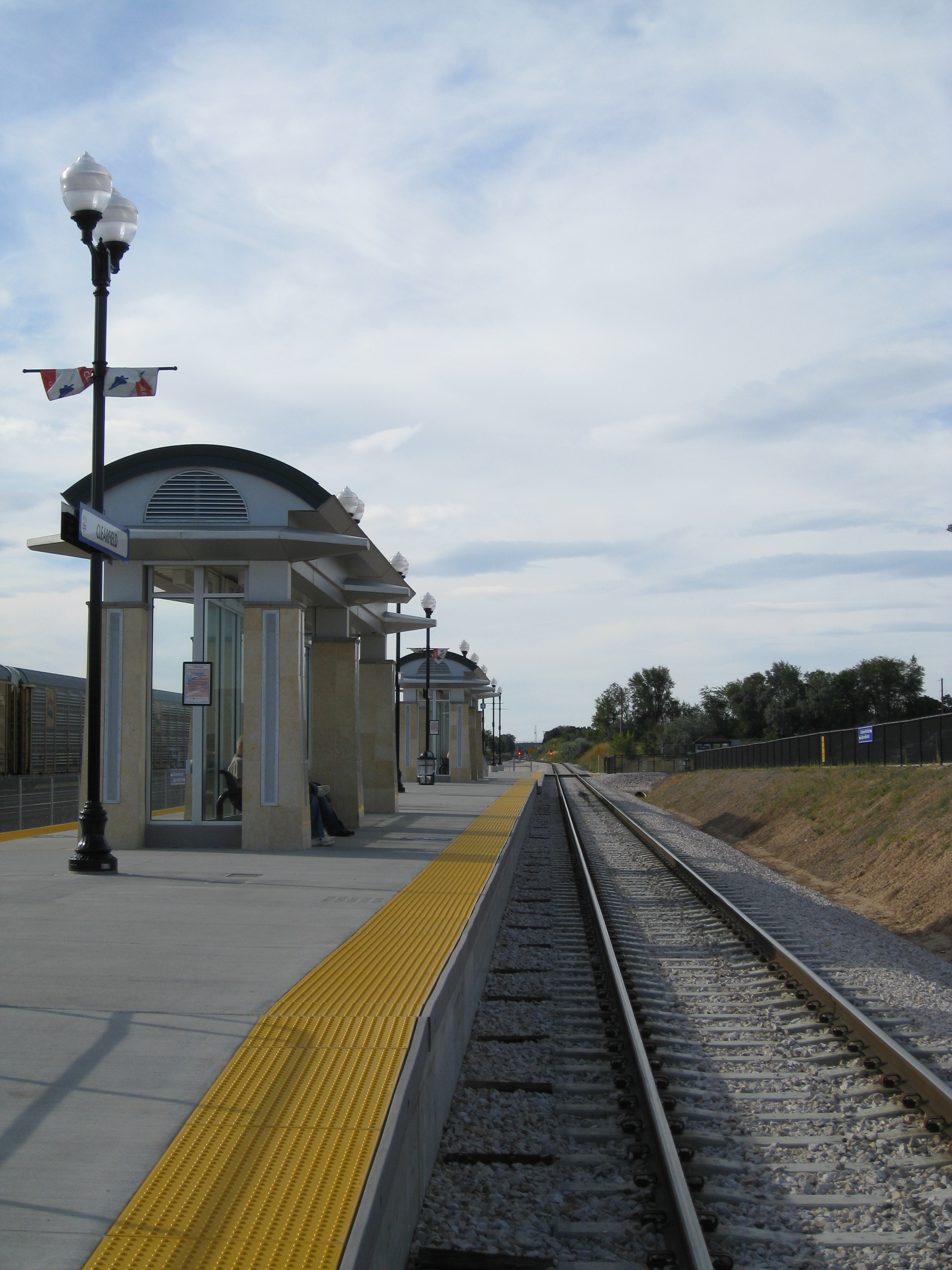
Clearfield City FrontRunner UTA Station

== Geography ==
Clearfield City has a total land area of 7.8 square miles (20 km^{2}), and a population of 31,909 as of the 2020 Census, making it the fifth largest city in Davis County, behind Layton, Bountiful, Kaysville, and Syracuse. This creates a population density of 1498.1 people per square kilometer or 3860.5 people per square mile. Clearfield City has an average elevation of 4,327 feet (1,319 m) above sea level. The lowest point within the boundaries of the city is 4,314 feet (1,315 m) at the intersection of 1000 West and Antelope Drive on the city's western edge, and the highest is 4,711 feet (1,436 m) at a point that is within the city's northeast corner but physically located on Hill Air Force Base property along Constitution Way in their housing area. (AGRC)

The city is located in the north-central portion of Davis County. The county is surrounded by the Great Salt Lake to the west and the steep Wasatch Range on the east, although neither of these notable natural landmarks is physically within the city boundaries. Directly encircling Clearfield are the cities/areas of Sunset City to the north, Clinton City to the northwest, Syracuse City and West Point City to the west, Layton City to the south and east, and Hill Air Force Base military installation to the northeast.

There are no major lakes or rivers within the city. There are a few small ponds, mostly at public parks or privately owned property. The only significant waterway in the city is the Weber and Davis Canal along the east and northeast edge of the city, which extends north and south of the city boundaries. The Clearfield Canal Trail parallels the canal for a portion of its trip through Clearfield. The Great Salt Lake is separated from Clearfield City by marshlands, mudflats, and the cities. The metabolic activities of bacteria in the lake result in a phenomenon known as "lake stink", a scent similar to sulfur, once or twice a year for a few hours.

The highest mountaintops visible from Clearfield City are Deseret Peak in Tooele County at 11,031 feet (3,362 m), Ben Lomond Peak in Weber County at 9,712 feet (2,960 m), and Thurston Peak, just to the east of Clearfield at 9,706 feet (2,958 m). Ben Lomond Peak and Thurston Peak are located in the Wasatch Range. The Wasatch Fault is found along the western base of the Wasatch Range and is considered overdue for an earthquake as large as 7.5. Catastrophic damage is predicted in the event of an earthquake, with major damage resulting from the liquefaction of the clay- and sand-based soil. The largest earthquake that has occurred near Clearfield City in the recorded past occurred on 12/7/1967 and was 21.5 miles (34.6 km) away in Park City, Utah, and registered at a magnitude of 4.3.

The Wasatch Front valley floor is the ancient lakebed of Lake Bonneville, which existed at the end of the last ice age. Several Lake Bonneville shorelines can be distinctly seen on the foothills or benches of nearby mountains.

=== Layout ===
The city's streets, along with the rest of Davis County north of Layton, are laid out on a unified grid plan. Most major streets run very nearly north–south and east–west. Clearfield City is the farthest east on this grid, while Syracuse, West Point, Sunset, Clinton, and Unincorporated Davis County are all located north, west, and south on the same street grid.

=== Neighborhoods ===
Clearfield City has many informal neighborhoods, most of which are more business or industrial-related than residential. In the southwestern portion of the city is a large industrial business center called The Freeport Center and the Clearfield Job Corps. Having the Job Corps next to one of the largest industrial centers in Northern Utah allows for on-the-job training for many of the programs offered. The Freeport Center began life in the 1940s as the Clearfield Naval Supply Depot but was phased out in 1962, and private firms began moving in.

South Clearfield is a residential neighborhood that is of note due to its isolation as the southernmost section of the city. It is cut off from the rest of residential Clearfield by The Freeport Center and other businesses, as well as being surrounded by other cities on 3 of the four sides of the area.

The presence of Hill Air Force Base has helped in creating two business neighborhoods. Falcon Hill is a 550-acre planned development underway on the west and southwest portion of the base that will be on leased federal government land, but all services and buildings will be public in any areas outside the fence line of the base. It is a planned aerospace research complex with space both inside and outside of the base fence line. (Commercial) Legend Hills is an office and retail-oriented business area located in the southeastern most corner of the city. It contains many different retail spaces and business offices in numerous office towers. All areas are easily accessed off Interstate 15, which runs north–south through the eastern edge of the city.

=== Climate ===
The climate of Clearfield City is characterized as humid Continental, with four distinct seasons. Both summer and winter are long, with hot, dry summers and cold, snowy winters, and with spring and fall serve as brief but comfortable transition periods. The city receives 20.75 inches (527 mm) of precipitation annually. Spring is the wettest season (May is the wettest month), while summer is very dry. Snow occurs on average from November to April, producing a total average of 24 inches (61 cm) yearly.

The primary source of precipitation in Clearfield City is massive Pacific storms that move in from the Pacific Ocean along the jet stream from approximately October through May. Particularly cold storms have brought measurable snow as early as September and as late as May. After the Pacific train of storms has shut off and the jet stream has retreated far to the north during summer, the primary source of precipitation is afternoon thunderstorms generated by monsoon moisture moving up from the Gulf of California during mid-to-late summer. Although rainfall can be heavy, these storms are usually scattered in coverage and are rarely severe.

Clearfield City features large variations in temperatures between seasons. The hottest month is July, and the coldest is January. The average temperature over the year is 53 °F (12 °C). The record high temperature is 108 °F (42 °C), which occurred in July 2002, while the record low is −26 °F (−32 °C), which occurred in January 1937. During mid-winter, strong areas of high pressure often situate themselves over the Great Basin, leading to strong temperature inversions. This causes air stagnation and thick smog in the valley from several days to weeks at a time and can result in the worst air-pollution levels in the U.S., reducing air quality to unhealthy levels. Aside from occasional heavy snows in winter, severe weather is very rare.

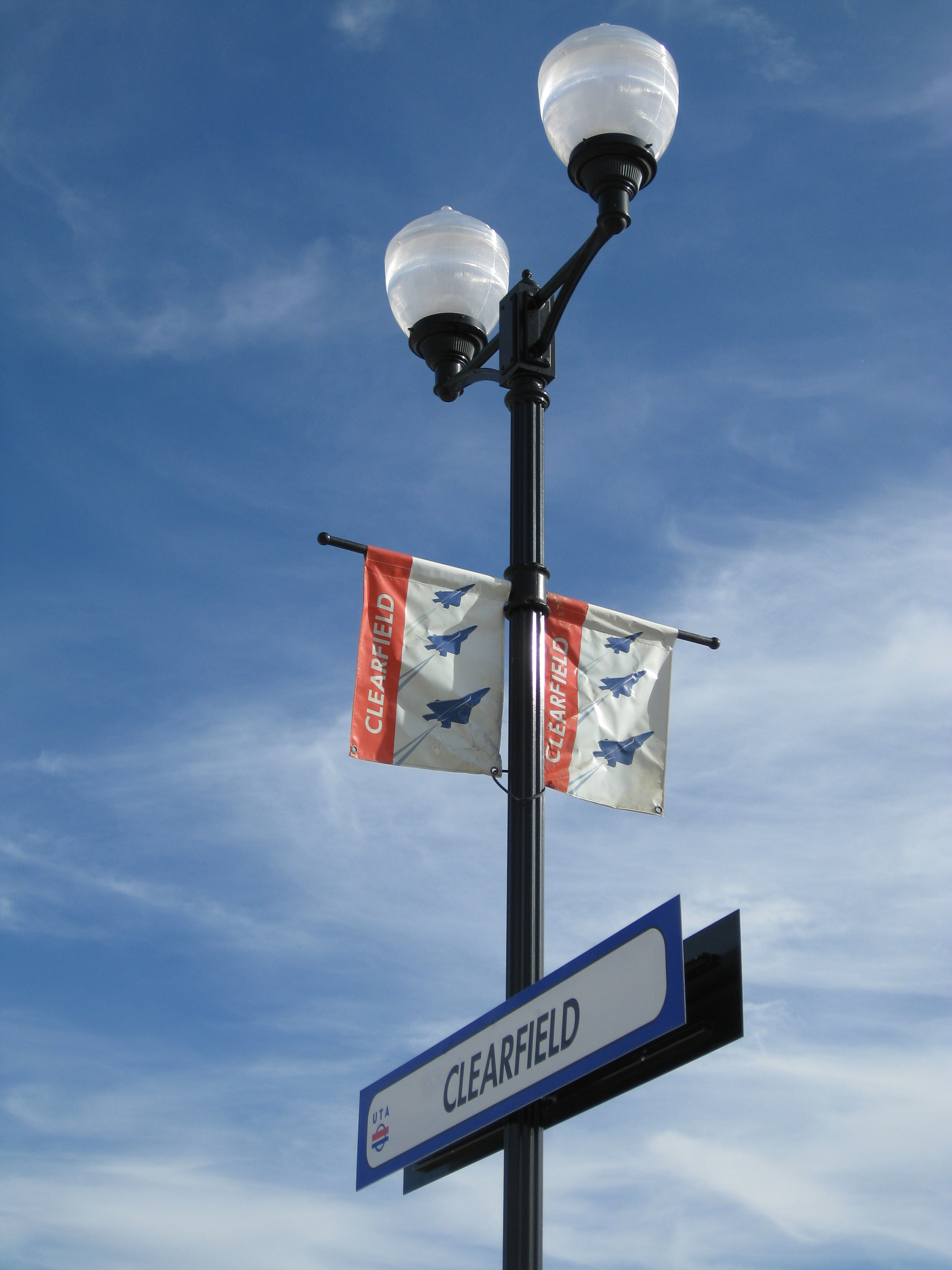
Clearfield City pole at UTA station

== Demographics ==
Historical population
Census	Pop.	Note	%±
1900	640		—
1910	791		23.6%
1920	658		−16.8%
1930	799		21.4%
1940	982		22.9%
1950	4,723		381.0%
1960	8,833		87.0%
1970	13,316		50.8%
1980	17,982		35.0%
1990	21,435		19.2%
2000	25,974		21.2%
2010	30,122		16.0%
2020	31,909		5.9%
U.S. Decennial Census

Demographic statistics for Clearfield are sourced from the United States Census Bureau.

=== 2020 census ===
As of the 2020 census, Clearfield had a population of 31,909 and a median age of 28.5 years; 32.3% of residents were under the age of 18 and 7.5% were 65 years of age or older. For every 100 females there were 102.6 males, and for every 100 females age 18 and over there were 99.3 males.

One hundred percent of residents lived in urban areas, while 0.0% lived in rural areas.

There were 10,343 households, of which 46.1% had children under the age of 18, 52.4% were married-couple households, 18.2% were households with a male householder and no spouse or partner present, and 22.7% were households with a female householder and no spouse or partner present. About 20.8% of all households were made up of individuals and 6.0% had someone living alone who was 65 years of age or older.

There were 10,870 housing units, of which 4.8% were vacant. The homeowner vacancy rate was 1.0% and the rental vacancy rate was 6.4%.

Racial composition as of the 2020 census
Race	Number	Percent
White	23,532	73.7%
Black or African American	896	2.8%
American Indian and Alaska Native	369	1.2%
Asian	804	2.5%
Native Hawaiian and Other Pacific Islander	398	1.2%
Some other race	2,446	7.7%
Two or more races	3,464	10.9%
Hispanic or Latino (of any race)	5,831	18.3%

== Economy ==
Some of the state's and Davis County's largest employers are located in Clearfield: Hill Air Force Base, Lifetime Products, Utility Trailer Manufacturing Company, Alliant Techsystems, Clearfield Job Corps (MTC), Futura Industries Corporation, and Smith Sport Optics, Inc.

Freeport Center The Freeport Center is a manufacturing, warehousing, and distribution center. It is home to more than 70 national and local companies that have a combined workforce of over 7,000 employees. Freeport Center has an excellent transportation network of highways and railroads, and is only 20 miles from the Salt Lake International Airport.

== Government ==
Clearfield City has a "six-member council" form of government, with a city manager by ordinance. In this form, the powers of municipal government are vested in a council consisting of six members, one of which is the mayor.

The mayor is, except in limited circumstances, a nonvoting member of the council. The mayor votes only when there is a tie vote of the other council members present, when the council is voting on whether to appoint or dismiss the city manager, or on an ordinance that enlarges or restricts the mayor's powers, duties, or functions. The mayor is the chair of the council and presides at all council meetings. The mayor also exercises ceremonial functions for the municipality such as ribbon cuttings and municipal appearances. The mayor may not veto an ordinance, tax levy, or appropriation passed by the council.

Other powers and duties of the mayor in a six-member council form of government can be taken from the mayor and given to either the council or city manager by the adoption of an ordinance by the council. In 1966, such an ordinance was passed in Clearfield City, giving the city manager such powers and duties.

By ordinance, therefore, the city manager is the chief executive officer of Clearfield City. This means that the city manager oversees the city's day-to-day operations, and all employees of the city report to the city manager. The city council appoints and hires the city manager and the city manager reports to the mayor and council. In the six-member council form of government, the council is the legislative body and is therefore primarily responsible for setting policy and adopting a balanced budget. The council enacts laws, appropriates funds, and reviews municipal administration. The city council shall elect one of its members to act as mayor pro tempore during the temporary absence or disability of the mayor. During such absence or disability, the mayor pro tempore shall possess the powers of mayor, except that the mayor pro tempore shall continue to cast votes as a member of the city council. The election of a mayor pro tempore shall be entered in the minutes of the meeting.

The most recent election was held in November, 2023. Dakota Wurth and Megan Ratchford were elected to serve their first terms on the City Council, while Nike Peterson was re-elected to serve her third term.

- Mark Shepherd, Mayor, 2026
- Tim Roper, City Councilperson, 2026
- Karece Thompson, City Councilperson, 2026
- Dakota Wurth, City Councilperson, 2028
- Nike Peterson, City Councilperson, 2028
- Megan Ratchford, City Councilperson, 2028

Elections are held in odd-numbered years.

== Notable people ==
- Haven J. Barlow (born in Clearfield), politician.
- Nolan Bushnell (born in Clearfield) is an American engineer and entrepreneur who founded both Atari, Inc and the Chuck E. Cheese's Pizza-Time Theaters chain.
- Shonduras, businessman
- Dallon Weekes is an American musician. He is the only permanent member of indie rock band The Brobecks and also played bass for Panic! at the Disco from 2009 to 2017.

== See also ==
- List of municipalities in Utah
