= Weber State University =

Public university in Ogden, Utah, US

- Former names: Weber Stake Academy (1889–1902); Weber Academy (1902–1918); Weber Normal College (1918–1922); Weber College (1922–1962); Weber State College (1962–1990)
- Type: Public university
- Established: 1889; 137 years ago 1964 (as four-year), 1991 (as university)
- Parent institution: Utah System of Higher Education
- Accreditation: NWCCU
- Academic affiliations: CUMU
- Endowment: $238 million (2025)
- President: Chris Mallett
- Academic staff: 1,046
- Administrative staff: 820
- Students: 29,914 (fall 2022)
- Undergraduates: 28,903 (fall 2022)
- Postgraduates: 1,011 (fall 2022)
- Location: Ogden, Utah, United States; 41.193°N 111.944°W
- Campus: Urban
- Colors: Purple and white
- Nickname: Wildcats
- Sporting affiliations: NCAA Division I FCS; Big Sky Conference
- Website: weber.edu

Weber State University (pronounced /ˈwiːbər/ WEE-bər) is a public university in Ogden, Utah, United States. It was founded in 1889 as Weber Stake Academy by The Church of Jesus Christ of Latter-day Saints and changed to its current name in 1991.

As of fall 2023, the student population was 30,536 students, consisting of 16,020 undergraduate students, 1,002 graduate students and 13,514 concurrent enrollment students, making it the third-largest public university in the state. Weber State University has over 225 degree programs and 7 colleges, including the Dr. Ezekiel R. Dumke College of Health Professions and the College of Engineering, Applied Science & Technology. Weber State is accredited by the Northwest Commission on Colleges and Universities and many programs are accredited through national organizations.

As of fall 2023, students who identify as Hispanic or Latino made up 13% of the full-time equivalent undergraduate student body. The university is working to become an emerging Hispanic-Serving Institution, a designation given when 15% of students identify as Hispanic or Latino. The university's athletic teams, the Wildcats, compete in the Big Sky Conference as an NCAA Division I institution.

== History ==
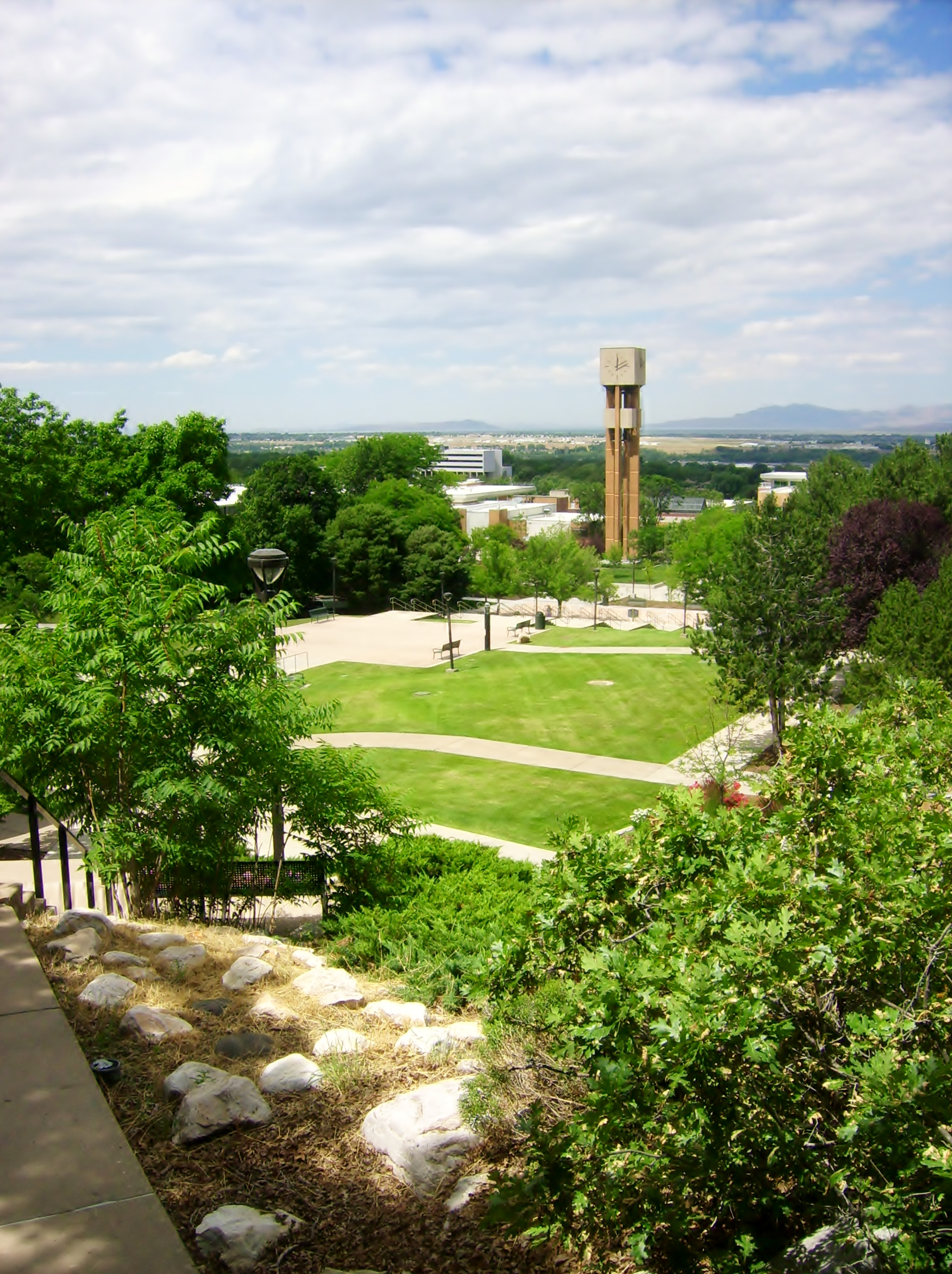
View of Weber State University campus from Ogden's east bench, July 2009

Weber State University was founded by The Church of Jesus Christ of Latter-day Saints as the Weber Stake Academy in 1889. "Weber" comes from the name of the county where the university is located. Weber County was named after John Henry Weber, an early fur trader. The university opened for students in 1889 with 98 students enrolled for classes on January 7. The first principal of Weber Stake Academy was Louis F. Moench; he served from 1889 to 1892 and again from 1894 to 1902. In the latter year, Moench was succeeded as principal by David O. McKay, who served in that position until 1908. From 1914 to 1917, James L. Barker was the principal of the Weber Stake Academy.

In the early 20th century, the school underwent multiple name changes: Weber Stake Academy from its founding in 1889, Weber Academy in 1902, Weber Normal College in 1918, and Weber College in 1922. By the late 1920s, however, the college was in financial difficulty, and The Church of Jesus Christ of Latter-day Saints faced four choices—transfer the college to a partnership of the city of Ogden and Weber County, transfer it to the University of Utah as a branch campus, transfer it to the state of Utah as a junior college, or shut it down. In 1931, the Utah Legislature passed a law providing for the acquisition of Weber College and Snow College from The Church of Jesus Christ of Latter-day Saints.

In 1933, Weber College became a state-supported junior college. In 1954, the college moved from its downtown location in Ogden to a spacious and scenic area in the southeast bench area of the city. The school became Weber State College in 1962, and in 1964 became a four-year college. It was a charter member of the Big Sky Conference in 1963. The first graduate program (accounting), was added in 1984, and it gained university status on January 1, 1991.

On July 8, 1993, 28-year-old student Mark Duong, a senior at Weber State, opened fire with a semi-automatic handgun at a grievance hearing. Duong wounded three, including a police officer; the officer returned fire and killed Duong. Duong was attending the grievance hearing due to an accusation of sexual harassment by a female classmate.

== Academics ==
Academic rankings

Regional
- U.S. News & World Report: 50 (tie)

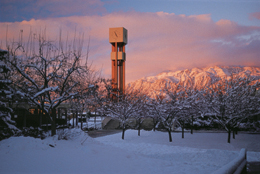
The Stewart Bell Tower, the most identifiable landmark of the Weber State campus, built in 1972.

Weber State University offers more than 225 certificate and degree programs provided through 7 colleges:

- College of Engineering, Applied Science & Technology
- College of Science
- College of Social & Behavioral Sciences
- Dr. Ezekiel R. Dumke College of Health Professions
- John B. Goddard School of Business & Economics
- Telitha E. Lindquist College of Arts & Humanities
- Jerry & Vickie Moyes College of Education

== Locations ==
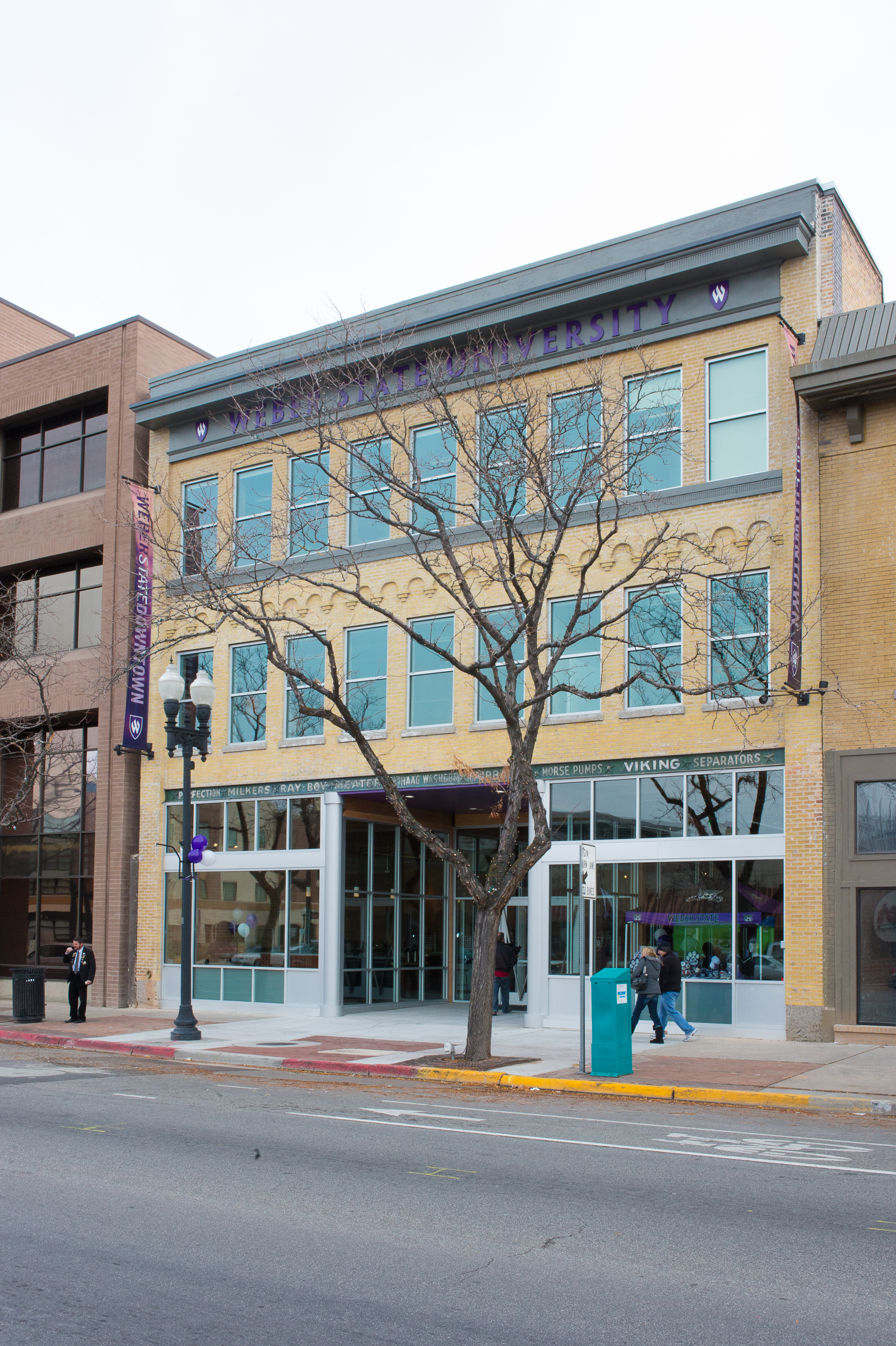
WSU Downtown

Weber State University's Ogden campus sits along the east bench of the Wasatch Mountains in Ogden, Utah. The Ogden campus covers over 500 acres, houses 63 buildings and features residence halls accommodating more than 1,000 students.

The Dee Events Center is on the south end of the campus and houses most of the university's indoor athletics, along with large community events and performances.

The Val A. Browning Center for the Performing Arts is located on Weber State's Ogden campus. It serves as an event host for over 200 events and welcomes about 70,000 patrons annually. Founded in 1962 as the Fine Arts Center, the facility has undergone many upgrades to accommodate world-class performances.

The Ogden campus is also home to Elizabeth Hall; Hurst Center; Dumke Center; Kimball Visual Arts Center; Lampros Hall; Lindquist Hall; Lind Lecture Hall; Lindquist Alumni Center; Marriott Allied Health; McKay Education Building; Noorda Engineering, Applied Science & Technology Building; Outdoor Adventure & Welcome Center; Shepherd Union; Stewart Library; Wattis Business; Wildcat Center for Health Education and Wellness; and Wildcat Village.

Weber State's Layton location, known as WSU Davis, is about 20 miles north of Salt Lake City and 15 miles south of Ogden. WSU Davis is a full-service campus offering access to computer labs, testing centers, a fitness center, student services and advisors. WSU Davis houses automotive technology; engineering, applied science and technology; child and family studies; business & economics; health professions; accounting and taxation; and general studies courses.

=== Other locations ===
Weber State University also offers courses and services off-campus at the Morgan Center in Morgan, Utah; Center for Continuing Education in Clearfield, Utah; Weber State Downtown in Ogden, Utah; Weber State Farmington Station in Farmington, Utah; and the Community Education Center in Ogden, Utah. Weber State also offers courses and degrees online through the Division of Online & Continuing Education.

=== Residence halls ===
Weber State's Ogden campus offers community-style living at the Wildcat Village for students. Weber State also offers apartment-style living at University Village, located on the south end of the Ogden campus, near Utah Transit Authority's Dee Events Center bus stop, providing access to campus.

=== Sustainability ===
Weber State University is working toward a five-point strategy to achieve carbon neutrality by 2040. The goal includes achieving carbon neutrality for all Weber State emissions, including student and employee commuting, waste and business travel.

Weber State was one of the first universities in the country to create a plan to transition its buildings to all-electric heat pump systems. Since 2007, Weber State has reduced its greenhouse gas emissions footprint by 34%, saving nearly $16 million in utility costs.

== Athletics ==
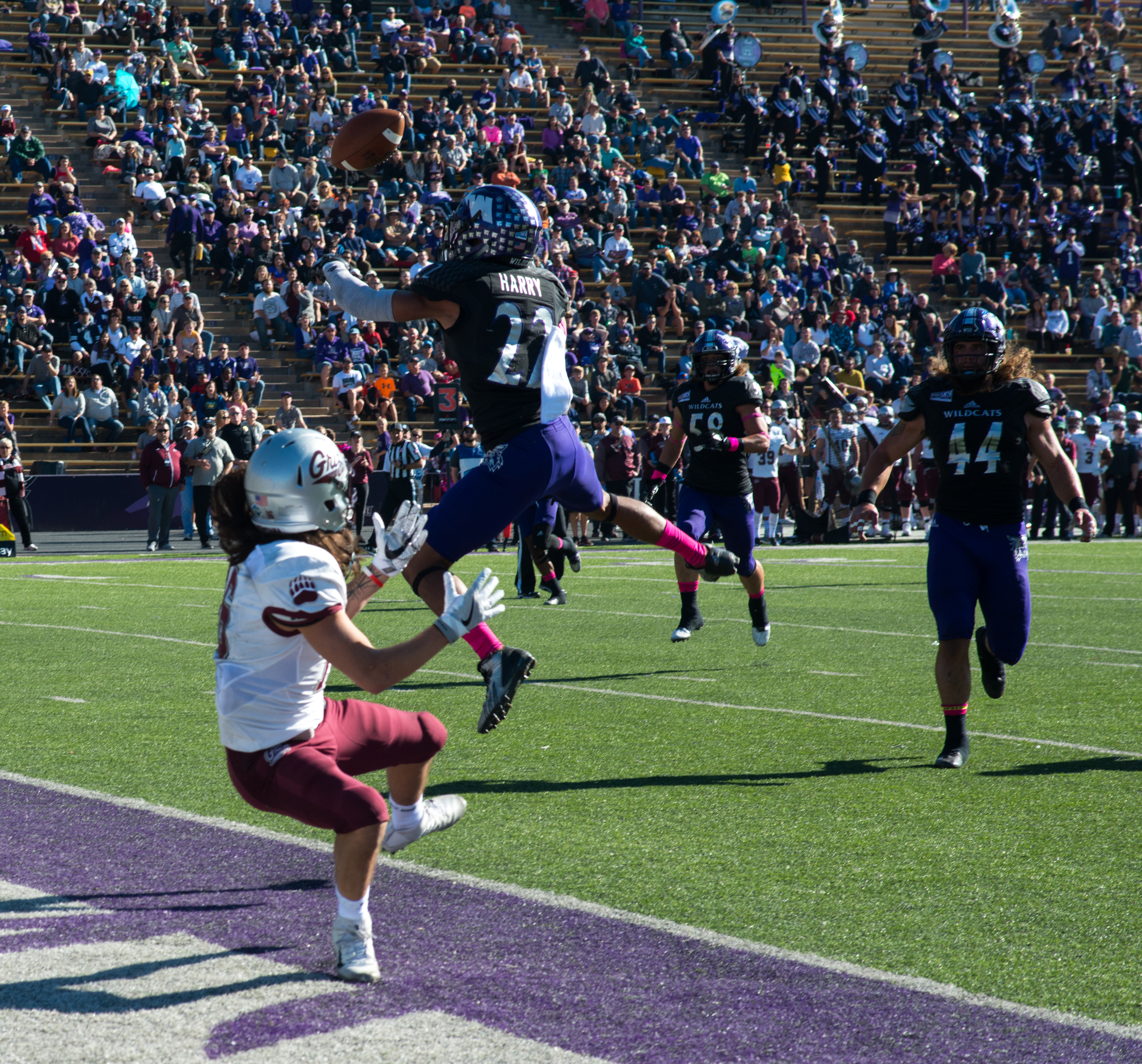
A 2017 Weber State Wildcats football game at Stewart Stadium

The university's athletic teams, the Wildcats, compete in the Big Sky Conference as an NCAA Division I institution. The university's colors are purple and white. The football team plays at the Stewart Stadium, located on the Ogden campus. The men's and women's basketball teams play at the Dee Events Center. Additional athletic programs include men's and women's track and field, men's and women's golf, men's and women's tennis, women's soccer, cheerleading, dance, volleyball and softball.

Weber State's Spirit Squad has won six national championships. In 2023, the Wildcat team won the Grand National Championship in the Large Co-Ed Division. Weber State had the best score of any school from any division in the competition.

Weber State also has club sports through Campus Recreation, including archery, baseball, climbing, golf, hockey, men's and women's lacrosse, pickleball, racquetball, rodeo, roundnet, men's and women's rugby, running, snowboard, soccer, table tennis, tennis, weightlifting and disc golf.

== Student life ==
Undergraduate demographics as of Fall 2023
Race and ethnicity	Total
White	72%
Hispanic	14%
Two or more races	4%
Unknown	3%
Asian	2%
Black	2%
International student	2%
American Indian/Alaska Native	1%
Native Hawaiian/Pacific Islander	1%
Economic diversity
Low-income (Note: The percentage of students who received an income-based federal Pell grant intended for low-income students.)	31%
Affluent (Note: The percentage of students who are a part of the American middle class at the bare minimum.)	69%

=== Student media ===
Weber State has an independent, student-run newspaper, The Signpost, that publishes twice weekly. The Signpost publishes the news and events on campus and around Ogden City through digital and print editions.

The university also has a student and volunteer-run online radio station, KWCR Wildcat Radio. The station teaches students how to operate a radio station and allows them to gain the skills and insight needed to compete in the job market after their studies. Students can also broadcast their own radio shows or playlists.

Metaphor is Weber State's undergraduate literary journal, entirely run by students. For over 40 years, the magazine has highlighted students' poetry, fiction, literary nonfiction, interviews and art.

Weber State's Alumni Association puts on a "Traditions Keeper" scavenger hunt each year where students can take pictures of themselves engaging in different events or on-campus areas to build up points for rewards and graduation regalia.

== Notable alumni and administrators ==
- Nolan D. Archibald, business executive
- Mark Evans Austad, communications expert
- Davion Berry (born 1991), basketball player
- Joseph Bishop, academic
- Fawn Brodie, author and historian
- Paul W Draper, anthropologist, mentalist, and speaker
- H. Tracy Hall, inventor of the industrial diamond
- Dee Hock, finance
- Ronald L. Holt, anthropologist
- Ben Howland, college basketball coach
- Taron Johnson (born 1996),football player
- Phil Johnson, professional basketball coach
- David M. Kennedy, politician
- Damian Lillard (born 1990), basketball player
- J. Willard Marriott, business magnate
- Jamie Martin, football player
- Paul McQuistan, football player
- David O. McKay, religious authority
- Wataru Misaka, basketball player
- Dick Motta, basketball coach
- Barry Mower, entertainment
- Jerry Moyes, transportation
- Sean O'Connell (attended), combat sports athlete
- Bob Pollard, football player
- Zahir Porter (born 2000), basketball player
- Alfred Pupunu, football player
- Todd Rose, educator
- Roger Ruzek, NFL football player
- Sarah Sellers (born 1991), marathon runner
- Richard H. Stallings, U.S. Representative
- Carla Taylor, women's college basketball coach
- Ernest L. Wilkinson, lawyer and university president
- Terry Lee Williams, politician

== Gallery ==
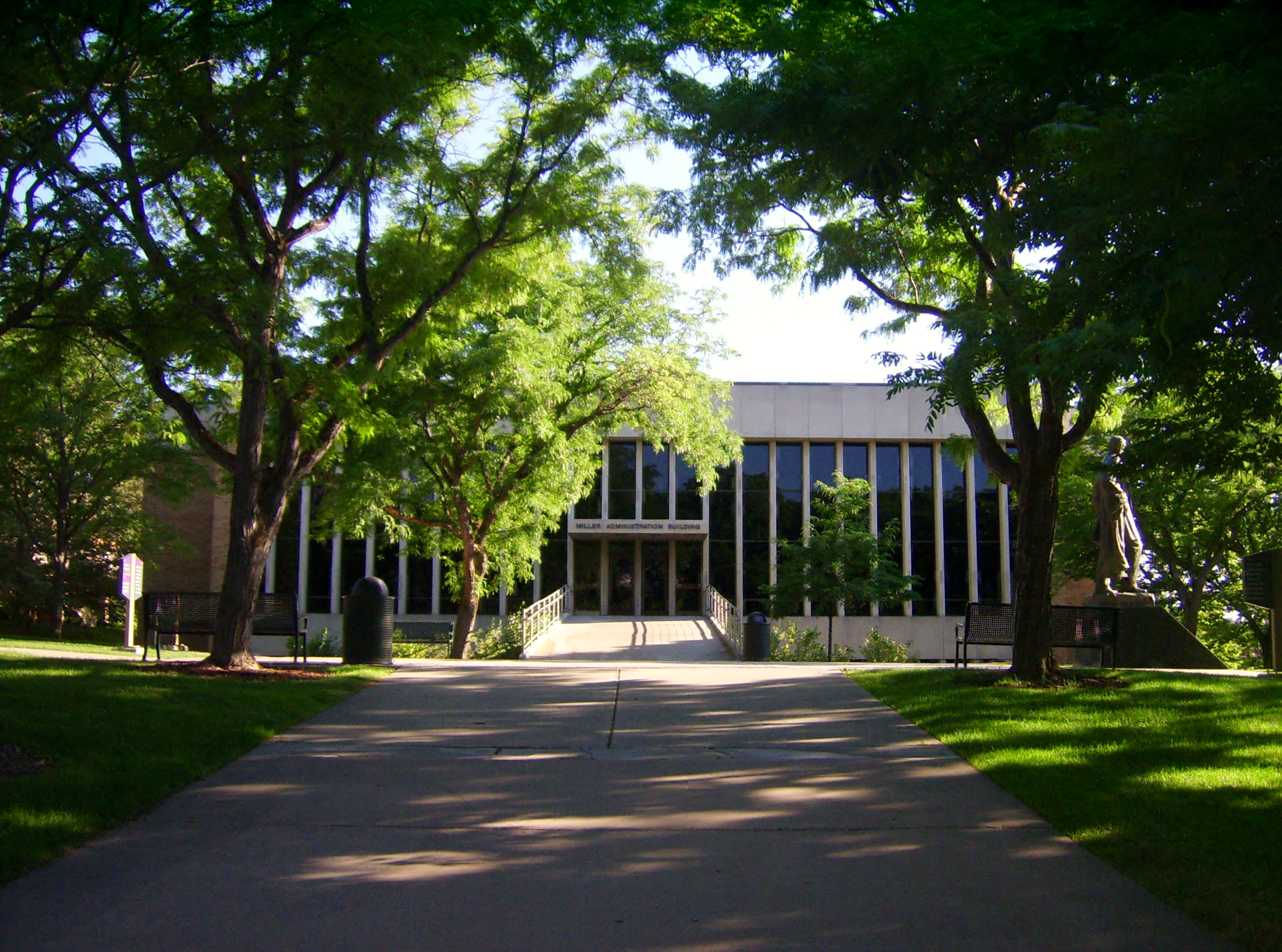
Miller Administration Building

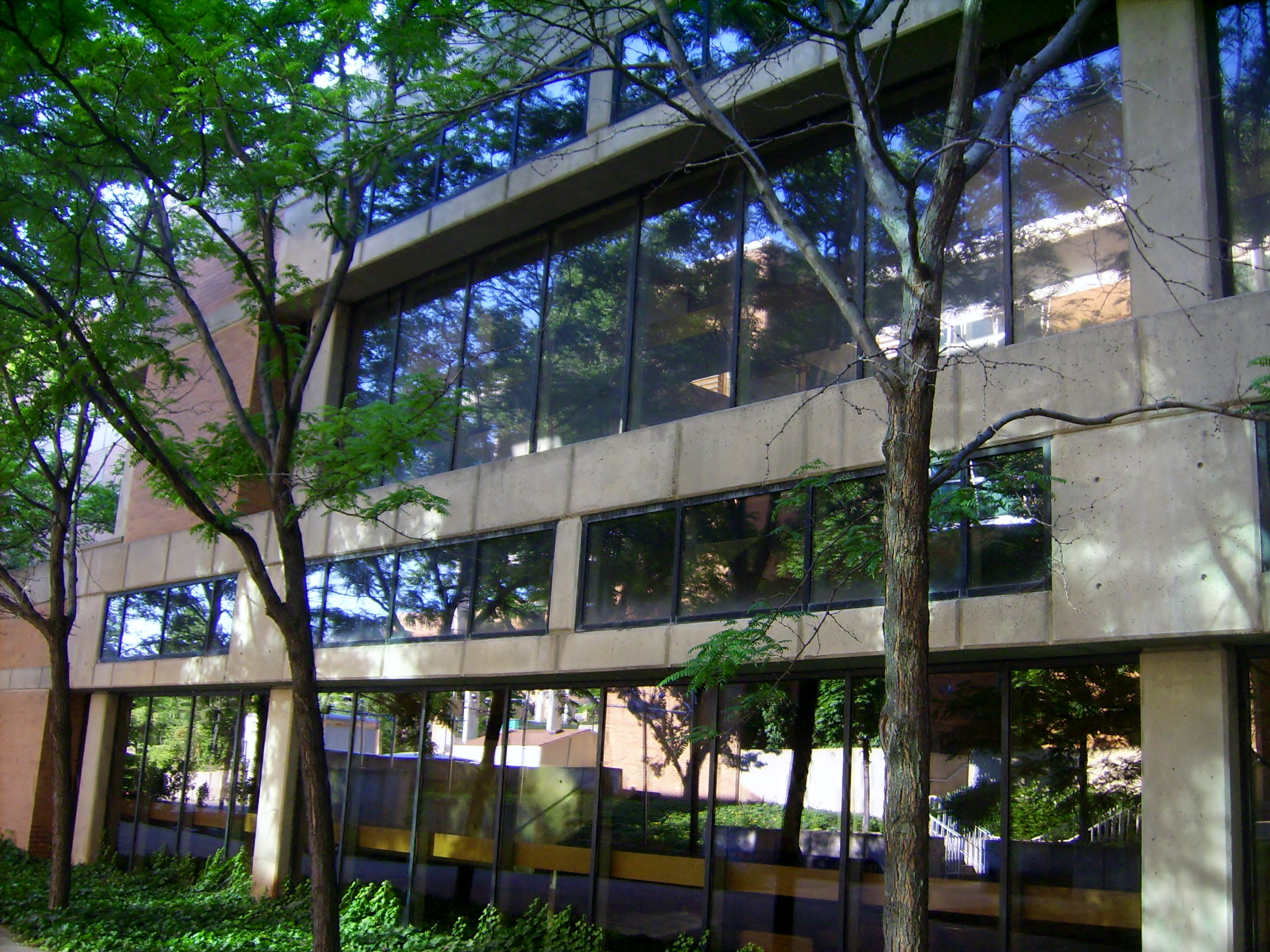
Student Services Center

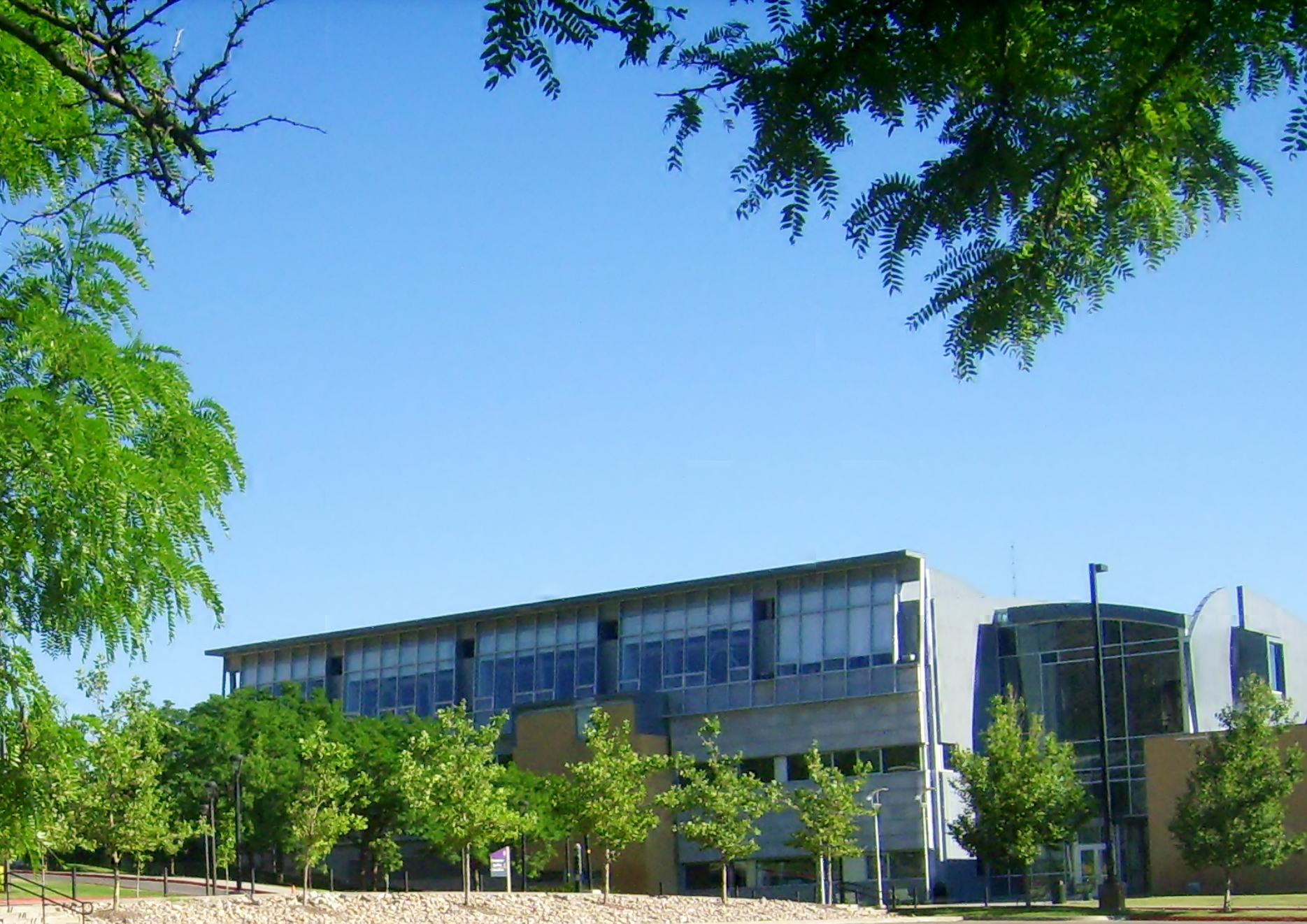
Kimball Visual Arts Center

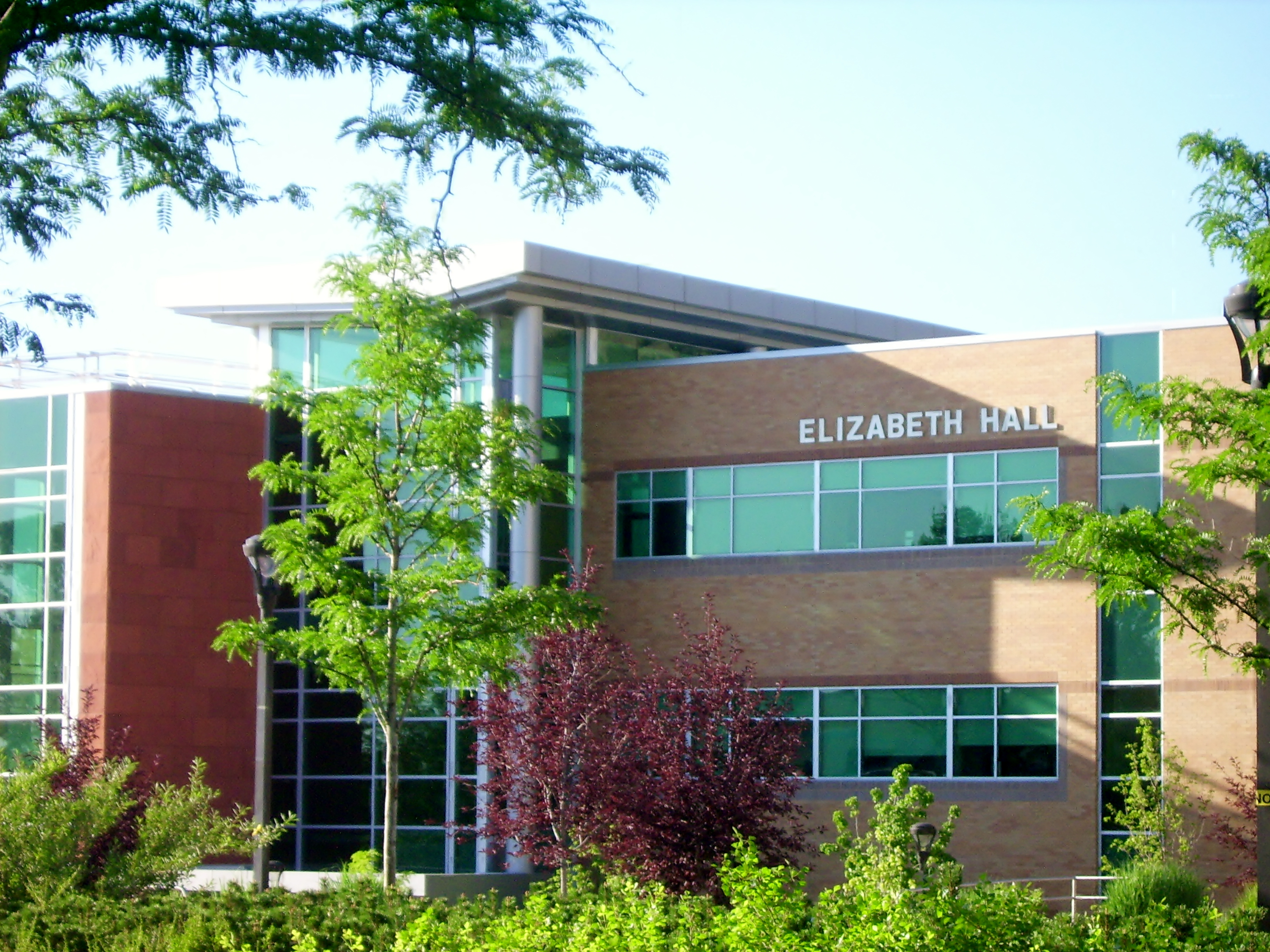
Elizabeth Hall

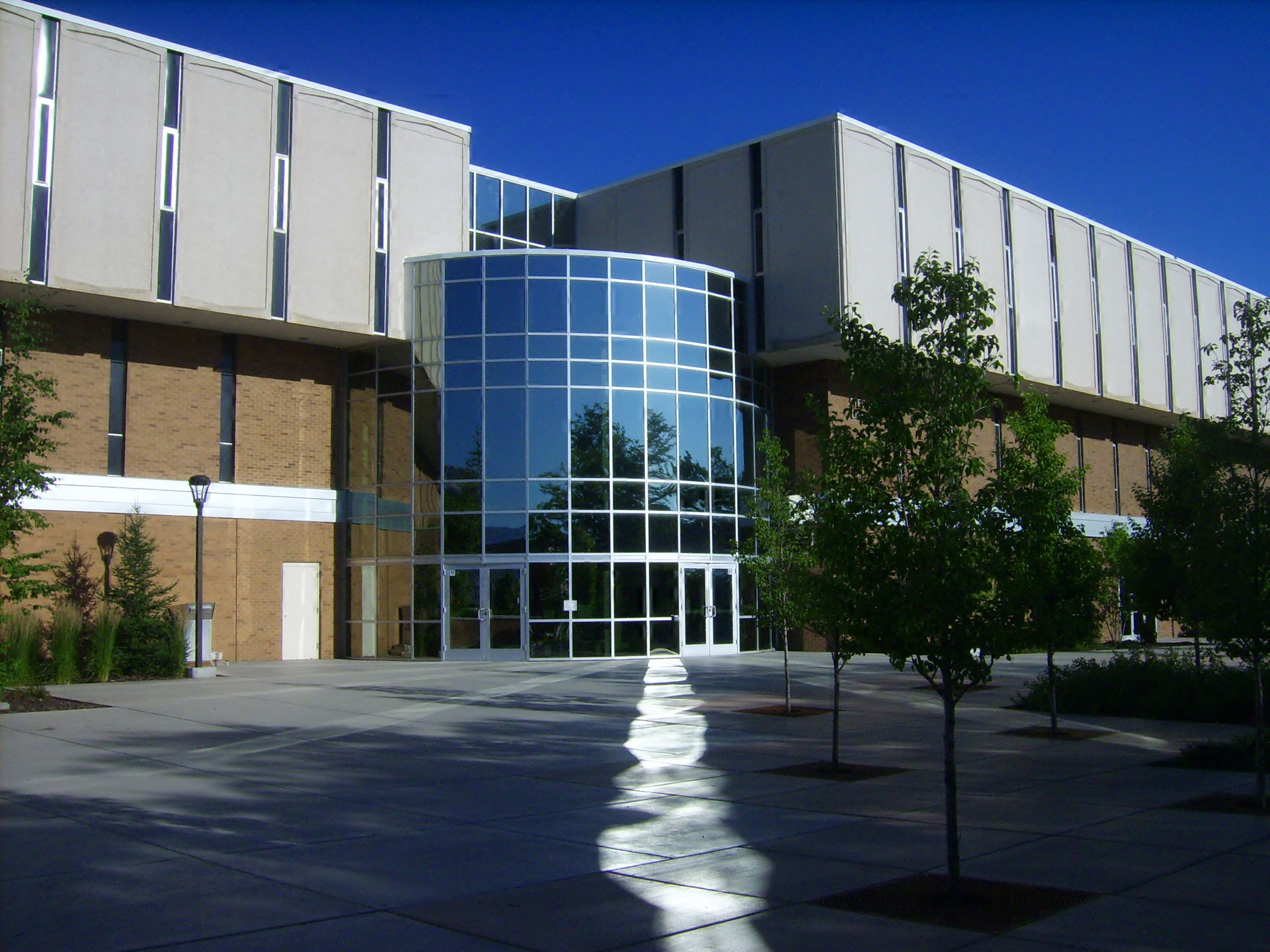
Stewart Library

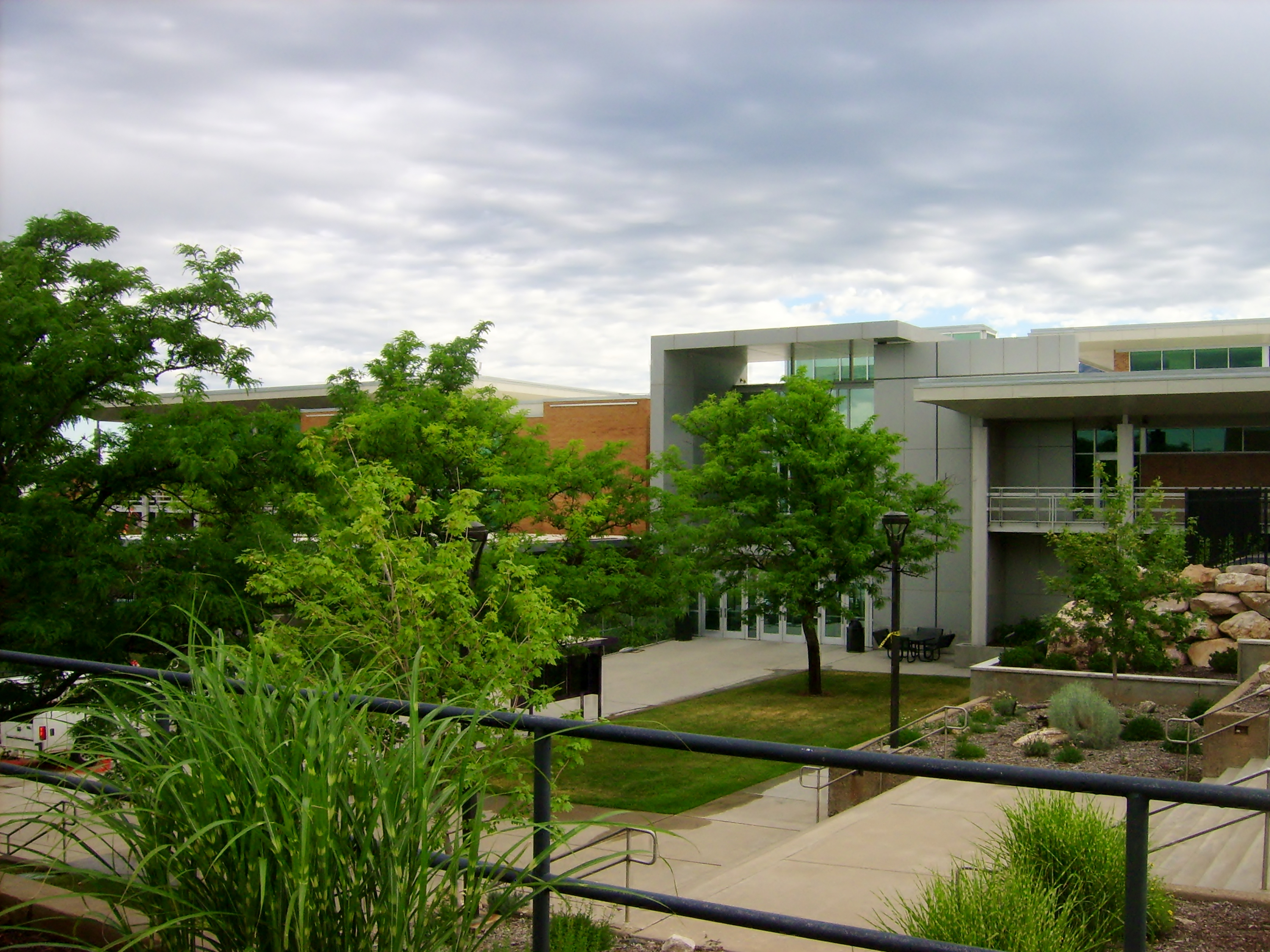
Shepherd Student Union
