= Mathematics in Ethiopia =

Since ancient times, traditional mathematics in Ethiopia have related to various aspects of astrology, the calendar, and measurements of physical properties such as length, weight, and distance. Ethiopians used alternate units of measurement which differ from fundamental law; traditionally, scaling and counting values have been described using draft animals such as goats, mules, sheep, or camels, and in modern times, steelyards.

== Measurements ==
=== Weight ===
Since measurements of weight often require accurate units or standardized scales, they were used less frequently than measurements of capacity (volume) in the past in Ethiopia. Still, there are three basic ways in which weight has been traditionally determined.

First, an object's lightness or heaviness could be simply assessed by feel (holding in one's hand) or sight (visual approximation). Second, a basic estimation of weight (such as of a load carried by a porter or draft animal) might be compared to a fundamentally different but familiar unit of another measure, such as the length of a human arm or the volume held in a hand. Third, more accurate comparisons of relative weights were done using scales or other apparatus.

Hand measurements were used in many parts of the country to purchase market goods, such as butter. The concepts of load and capacity were often used in lieu of weight when measuring cheap, bulk commodities, such as grain. More sophisticated and accurate techniques were only used for valuable goods such as medicine, gold, and silver. In fact, in the case of gold and silver, weight was essentially considered a concept of value.

==== Load ====
The concept of load—a rough measurement based on the average weight carried by a human porter, donkey, mule, or camel—has long been a widely used unit of weight in traditional Ethiopia, due to its natural emergence from traditional transport. Portuguese Jesuit missionary Manuel de Almeida noted in the 17th century that "the Emperor 'raises ten or twelve thousand loads of provisions' from State lands", while the chronicle of Emperor Iyasu I (r. 1682–1706) "reveals that taxes on trade were likewise largely based on mule and donkey loads".

==== Scales and steelyards ====
The balance has been the most renowned instrument within Ethiopian society. It has various terms in native languages: the Ge'ez word madalew (Ge'ez: መድሎት, romanized: madelot; plural: መዳልው, madalew) is first mentioned by the chronicle of Emperor Gelawdewos (1540–1559), in which the ruler spent 10,000 madalew of gold for purchase of books. However, the text may be a mistake by a French editor, and actually refer to 10,000 waqet (Amharic: ወቄት).

Two types of weighting instruments were used. The first was a conventional balance consisting of two equal-length lever arms with two trays: one to hold the object to be weighted and the other to hold a comparison weight. The second was a steelyard balance based on a single tray subtended from a level with unequal arms, the longer arm counteracting the tray. As the more sensitive of the two instruments, steelyards were used to measure the weight of precious metals and other valuable goods. The use of the steelyard was first mentioned in Johnston's early-19th century account of Shewan market in Aliyu Amba, where he recorded "a rude kind of balance".

Traditional scales are known by various names, such as amole mäsa (Amharic: አሞሌ መሳ), which are used to measure bars of salt or cotton. This type of scale had three notches for weighing different objects. The first, near the end of a piece of wood, was used to weigh heavy objects (also known as amole mäsa); the second, known as sinbit (lit. 'notch'), was used to measure smaller articles including salt, pepper, flour, coffee, and butter; the third, known as bäkush (በኩሽ) or kush (ኩሽ), was equal to half of a sinbit (ስንብት) and a quarter of an amole mäsa. The modern type of steelyard balance was introduced by Italians during their second occupation of Ethiopia, and are still used by Gurage merchants for fruit and vegetables.

=== Length and volume measurements ===
The following lists are traditional Ethiopian measurements of length and volume.

Traditional Ethiopian length measurements
Units	Notes
Azq	Distance from the tip of the index finger to the first joint (Angua). About one inch.
Sinzir	Distance from the tip of the middle finger to the tip of the thumb while hand is fully extended. Depending on the size of the hand, it could be anywhere from six to twelve inches.
Kend	Distance from the tip of the elbow to the tip of the middle finger. Depending on the size of the arm, it could be between one and two feet.
Aarb	Distance of about a yard. Used to measure woven fabrics.
Chamma	Distance from the back of the heel to the tip of the big toe. Depending on the size of foot, it could be either a few inches or a dozen or more.

Traditional Ethiopian volume measurements
Units	Notes
Dawulla	Volume for grain of approximately 50 kg. Depends on the size of the animal (goat or sheep) from which the dawulla was made.
Tassa, Ensira, Gerwoina, and Gan	Containers of liquids used to measure volume. A tassa is about a litre; an ensira is anywhere from two to several gallons (depending on size); a gerwoina is about 20–30 litres; a gan is several gallons.
Feresulla	Unit of volume that changes based on item being measure. 1 feresulla roughly equals to 17 kilogram.

== Astrology ==
Mathematics is often associated with astrology in traditional Ethiopia. Ethiopian astrology, known as hasabe kewakibit, is part of bahre hasab, which is known as Ethiopian astrology and computus (church calendar). Stars were also used in ancient times to determine the timing of the harvest season or human behavior.

Aside from this, Ethiopia used zodiac system as fortune telling.

== Calendar ==
The Ethiopian calendar, also known as Ge'ez calendar, was adapted from the Alexandrian or Coptic calendar which in turn derived from the Egyptian calendar. Like the Julian calendar, the Ethiopian calendar employs leap years, beginning on 29 August or 30 August. The calendar is distinguished from the Gregorian calendar by a gap of 7–8 years which results from alternative calculations in determining the date of the Annunciation of Jesus.

The Ethiopian calendar is also used as a liturgical calendar for Eritrean Christians belonging to the Eritrean Orthodox Tewahedo Church, Eastern Catholic Church, and Lutheran Evangelical Church of Eritrea. Like the Coptic calendar, the Ethiopian calendar has a thirteenth month composed of five or six epagomenal days. Months begin on the same days as in the Coptic calendar but are named in the Ge'ez language. The six epagomenal days are added every four years on 29 August of Julian calendar, six months before the Julian leap day. Therefore, 1 Mäskäräm is the first day of the years between 1901 and 2099 inclusively, and falls on 11 September of Gregorian calendar (or 12 September before Gregorian leap year). For example, the year 2012 is 2005 in the Ethiopian calendar, which began on 11 September 2012.

The Oromo calendar was developed in 300 BC. Based on lunar-stellar composition, the calendar relies on astronomical observation of the moon in conjunction with seven particular stars of constellations. The Oromo months (based on stars and lunar phases) are Bittottessa (Triangulum), Camsa (Pleiades), and Bufa (Aldebaran).

=== New Year's Day ===
Enkutatash is the New Year holiday of Ethiopia and Eritrea. It occurs from 11 September – 12 September except for Gregorian leap years. The date correspondence applies from the Gregorian years 1900 to 2099. The Ethiopian calendar has a leap year every four years, without exception, while the Gregorian calendar has a leap year every four years except centennial years not divisible by 400. Thus, the date difference between the two calendars increases by about one day per century (or more precisely, one day per non-quadcentennial century).

=== Eras ===
Ethiopians and Eritreans follow Incarnation Era starting from Annulation or Incarnation of Jesus on 25 March 9 AD, calculated by Annianus of Alexandria c. 400 AD. Thus, the first civil year began seven months earlier, on 29 August 8 AD. This calendar differs from European calendars due to the adoption of subsequent calculation by Dionysus Exiguus in 525 AD, which placed the Annunciation eight years earlier than had Annianus. This places the Ethiopian calendar about 7–8 years behind the Gregorian calendar, depending on which part of the year is being compared.

In the past, numbering era was widely used in the Aksumite Kingdom.

=== Era of the Martyrs ===
"Era of the Martyrs", also known as Diocletian Era, is mostly used by Eastern Churches and the Coptic Church, and began on 29 August 284. Three months later then the Gregorian and Julian calendars, the difference between the Era of Martyrs and Anno Domini is 285 (15×19) years, caused in 525 AD. Dionysus Exiguus decided to add 15 Metonic cycles to the existing Diocletian Era (15×19 + 13×19 = 532) to obtain the 532-year medieval Easter cycle, whose first cycle ended with the Era of Martyrs year 247 (13×19), equal to year DXXXI. 532 years is a product of Metonic cycle of 19 years and Solar cycle of 28 days.

=== Anno Mundi according to Panodoros ===
Around 400 AD, an Alexandrian monk named Panodorus fixed the Alexandria Era, which determines Anno Mundi (the year of world) starting from 29 August 5493 BC. After 6th century, the era was used by Egyptian and Ethiopian chronologists. The twelfth 532-year-cycle of this era began on 29 August 360 AD, which is 76 (4×19) years after the Era of Martyrs.
