= George Cannon =

George Cannon may refer to:

- George Cannon (publisher) (1789–1854), English radical publisher and pornographer
- George Cannon (wrestler) (1932–1994), Canadian wrestler
- George H. Cannon (1915–1941), United States Marine and Medal of Honor recipient
- George I. Cannon (1920–2009), leader in The Church of Jesus Christ of Latter-day Saints
- George Q. Cannon (1827–1901), early member of the Quorum of the Twelve Apostles and First Presidency of The Church of Jesus Christ of Latter-day Saints
- George Mousley Cannon (1861–1937), first president of the Utah State Senate
- George W. Cannon (died 1897), American inventor
- George Cannon (footballer) (1891–1951), English football inside right
