= Lazy Susan =

Tabletop turntable for serving food

- Traditional Chinese: 餐桌轉盤
- Simplified Chinese: 餐桌转盘
- Literal meaning: dinner-table turntables
Transcriptions
Standard Mandarin
- Hanyu Pinyin: cānzhuō zhuànpán
- Bopomofo: ㄘㄢ ㄓㄨㄛ ㄓㄨㄢˇ ㄆㄢˊ
- Gwoyeu Romatzyh: tsanjuo joanparn
- Wade–Giles: ts'an^{1} cho^{1} chuan^{3} p'an^{2}

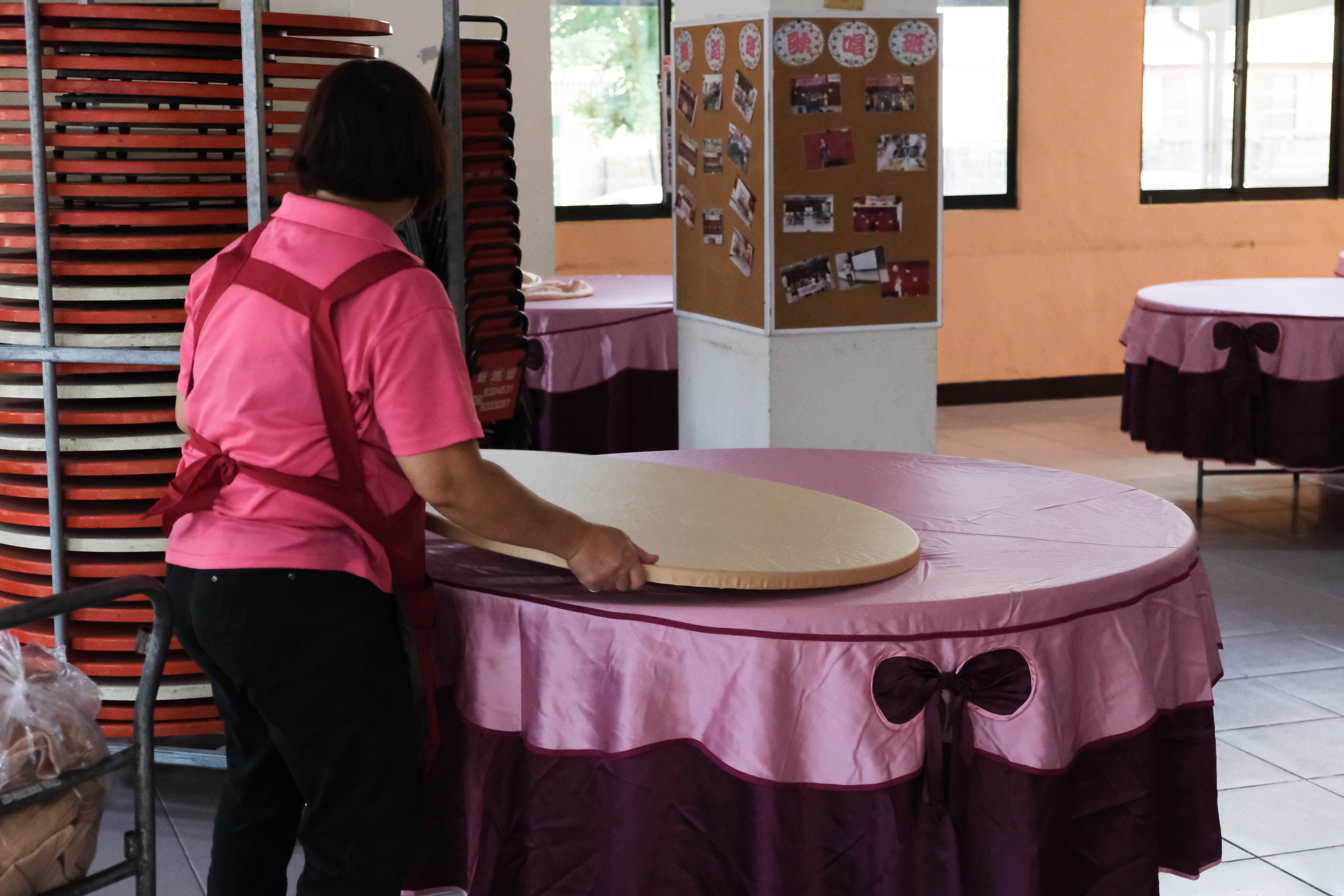
A member of staff sets up the table in a Taiwanese roadside banquet event.

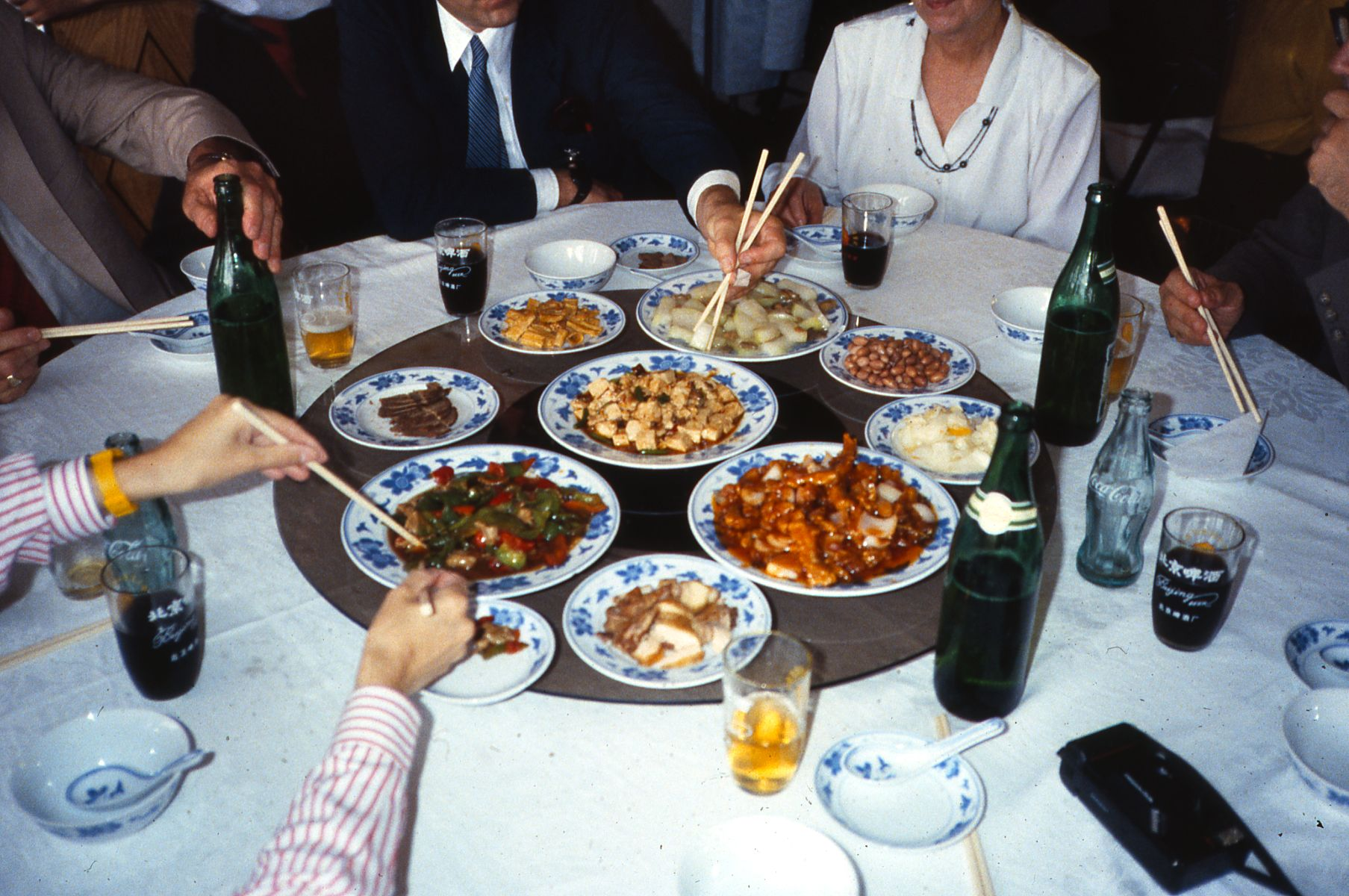
A lazy Susan in a Chinese restaurant

A lazy Susan is a turntable (rotating tray) placed on a table or countertop to aid in distributing food. Lazy Susans may be made from a variety of materials but are usually glass, wood, or plastic. They are circular and placed in the centre of a table to share dishes easily among diners. Owing to the nature of Chinese cuisine, especially Cantonese dim sum, they are common at formal Chinese restaurants worldwide. In Chinese, they are known as cānzhuō zhuànpán (餐桌转盘; 餐桌轉盤; 'dinner-table turntables').

== History ==
It is likely that the explanation of the term lazy Susan has been lost to history. Folk etymologies claim it as an American invention. According to lore, Thomas Jefferson invented the device, which was known as a "dumbwaiter", for his daughter Susan. Regardless of the origins of the name, by 1917 it was advertised in Vanity Fair as "Ovington's $8.50 mahogany 'Revolving Server or Lazy Susan'", but the term's use predates both the advertisement and, probably, the country.

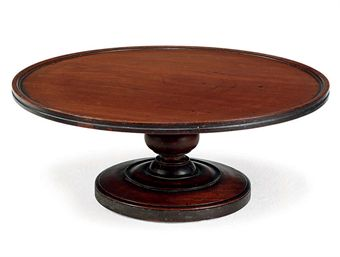
A mahogany George III-era dumbwaiter (c. 1780), auctioned for $3,900 by Christie's in London on 20 Jan. 2010

Part of the mystery arises from the variety of devices that were grouped under the term dumb waiter (today written dumbwaiter). An early 18th-century British article in The Gentleman's Magazine describes how silent machines had replaced garrulous servants at some tables and, by the 1750s, Christopher Smart was praising the "foreign" but discreet devices in verse. It is, however, almost certain that the devices under discussion were wheeled serving trays similar to those introduced by Thomas Jefferson to the United States from France, where they were known as étagères. At some point during or before the third quarter of the 18th century, the name dumb waiter also began to be applied to rotating trays. (Jefferson never had a lazy Susan at Monticello, but he did construct a box-shaped rotating book stand and, as part of serving "in the French style", employed a revolving dining-room door whose reverse side supported a number of shelves.). By the 1840s, Americans were applying the term to small lifts carrying food between floors as well. The success of George W. Cannon's 1887 mechanical dumbwaiter popularised this usage, replacing the previous meanings of dumbwaiter.

The lazy Susan was initially uncommon enough in the United States for the utopianist Oneida Community to be credited with its invention. They employed the devices as part of their practice of communal living, making food easily and equally available to residents and visitors at meals. An American patent was issued in 1891 to Elizabeth Howell for "certain new and useful Improvements in Self-Waiting Tables". Howell's device ran more smoothly and did not permit bread crumbs to fall into the space between the lazy Susan and the table.

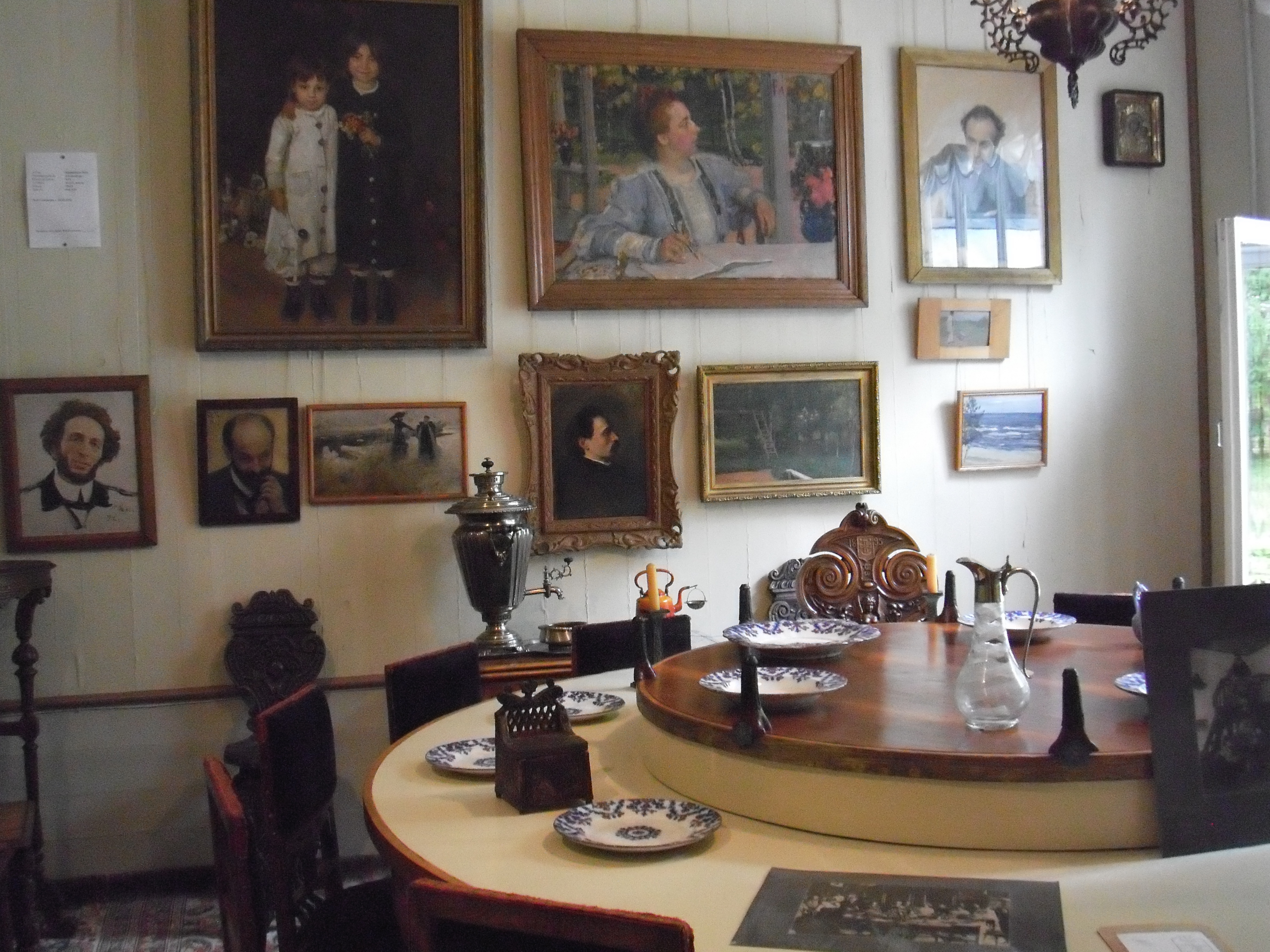
The rotating serviette at "Penates", the estate of Russian painter Ilya Repin at Kuokkala. Made in 1909 by Finnish carpenter Ikahainen.

Despite various folk etymologies linking the name to Jefferson's and Edison's daughters, the earliest use of these "serviettes" or "butler's assistants" being called a lazy Susan dates to the 1903 Boston Journal:

John B. Laurie, as the resuscitator of "Lazy Susan", seems destined to leap into fortune as an individual worker. "Lazy Susan" is a step toward solving the ever-vexing servant problem. She can be seen, but not heard, nor can she hear, she simply minds her business and carries out your orders in a jiffy.

Laurie was a Scottish carpenter who made his "lazy Susan" to the personal specifications of a Hingham-area woman. Unfortunately he presented this gift to her too late, which caused her to unleash an abusive tirade upon Laurie. When she finally asked him for the price, he "told her it wasn't for sale, though of course it is". The name was repeated in a 1911 Idaho Statesman article – which describes it as "a cousin to the 'curate's assistant', as the English muffin stand is called" – and again in the 1912 Christian Science Monitor, which calls the "silver" lazy Susan "the characteristic feature of the self-serving dinner table". By the next year, the Lima Daily News described an Ohioan "inaugurat[ing] ... the 'Lazy Susan' method of serving". Henry Ford used an enormous one on his camping trips in the 1920s to avoid bringing a full contingent of servants along with his guests. In 1933, the term was added to the Webster's Dictionary.

Unusually, the 1916 American Cookery describes the device as a German invention:

There is a table arrangement used much in Germany, which has now found its way to America, though it is still by no means common. The German frau calls it "Lazy Susan", but it is entirely different from our product used for salt and pepper shakers. Its only point of similarity is the swivel upon which it turns. The one which joys my heart is of mahogany, and it turns automatically at the slightest touch. It contains seven china dishes, six of which are trapezoids, the center one being octagonal. The trapezoids fit about the center octagon, forming a perfect whole.

By 1918, Century Magazine was already describing the lazy Susan as out of fashion, but beginning in the 1950s its popularity soared once again after the redesign and reintroduction of the lazy Susan by George Hall, an engineer, soy sauce manufacturer, and partner in popular San Francisco-area Chinese restaurants (Johnny Kan's, Ming's of Palo Alto and John Ly's Dining), and the rotating tray became ubiquitous in Chinese restaurants and was used in homes around the globe. The decline in America's domestic service sector after World War I and its collapse following World War II, combined with the post-war Baby Boom, led to a great demand for them in US households across the country in the 1950s and 1960s. This popularity has had the effect, however, of making them seem kitsch in subsequent decades.

== Other uses ==
The term is infrequently used for the much older turntables employed in pottery wheels and related tasks like sculpture, modeling, repair work, etc.

== See also ==
- Round table (furniture)
- Serving cart
