= Dumbwaiter =

Elevator for food

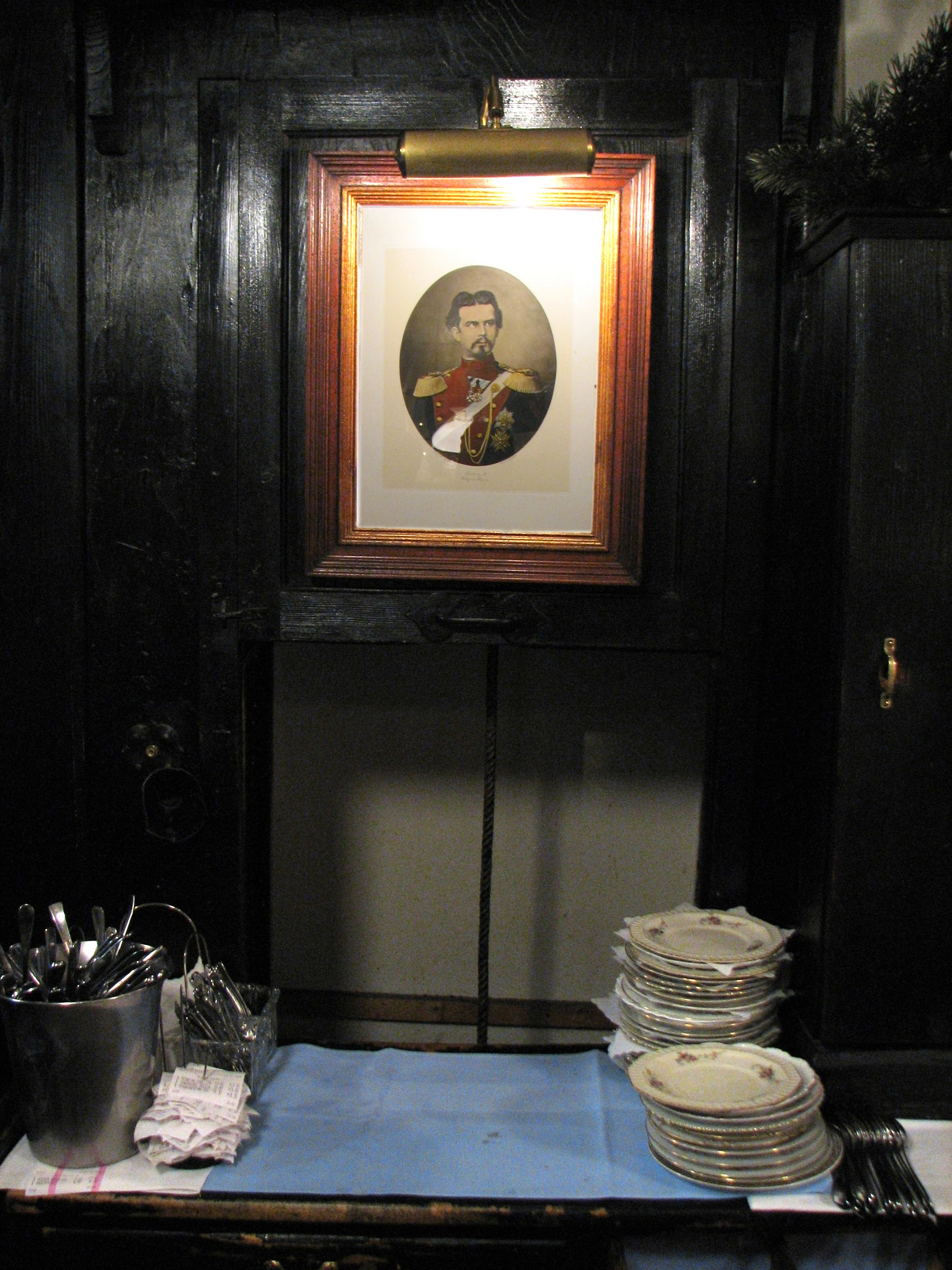
A dumbwaiter also known as a lazy waiter (Speiseaufzug) in the oldest restaurant in Munich, the Hundskugel, with the hand-pulled cart in the "UP" position and only the rope visible

A dumbwaiter is a small freight elevator or lift intended to carry food. Dumbwaiters found within modern structures, including both commercial, public and private buildings, are often connected between multiple floors. When installed in restaurants, schools, hospitals, retirement homes or private homes, they generally terminate in a kitchen.

The term seems to have been popularized in the United States in the 1840s, after the model of earlier "dumbwaiters" now known as serving trays and lazy Susans. The mechanical dumbwaiter was invented by George W. Cannon, a New York City inventor. He first filed for the patent of a brake system (US Patent no. 260776) that could be used for a dumbwaiter on January 6, 1883, then for the patent on the mechanical dumbwaiter (US Patent No. 361268) on February 17, 1887. He reportedly generated vast royalties from the patents until his death in 1897.

== Description ==
A simple dumbwaiter is a movable frame in a shaft, dropped by a rope on a pulley, guided by rails; most dumbwaiters have a shaft, cart, and capacity smaller than those of passenger elevators, usually 45 to 450 kg (100 to 992 lbs.) Before electric motors were added in the 1920s, dumbwaiters were controlled manually by ropes on pulleys.

Early 20th-century building codes sometimes required fireproof dumbwaiter walls and self-closing fireproof doors, and mention features such as buttons to control movement between floors and locks to prevent doors from opening unless the cart is stopped at that floor. Dumbwaiter lifts in London were extremely popular in finer homes. Maids used them to deliver laundry to the laundry room, making it unnecessary to carry dirty laundry through the house, saving time and preventing injury.

A legal complaint about a Manhattan restaurant's dumbwaiter in 1915—which also mentioned that food orders were shouted up and down the shaft—described its operation and limitations:

[There is] ... great play between the cart of the dumb-waiter and the guides on which it runs, with the result that the running of the cart is accompanied by a loud noise. The rope which operates the cart of the dumb-waiter runs in a wheel with a very shallow groove, so that the rope is liable to and does at times slip off. ... The cart has no shock absorbers at the top, so that when it strikes the top of the shaft or wheel there is a loud report. ... [T]he ropes of the dumb-waiter strike such wall at frequent intervals with a loud report. ... [T]he dumb-waiter is often negligently operated, by running it faster than necessary, and by letting it go down with a sudden fall.

More recent dumbwaiters can be more sophisticated, using electric motors, automatic control systems, and custom freight containers characteristic of other kinds of elevators. Recently constructed book lifts in libraries and mail or other freight transports in office towers may be larger than many dumbwaiters in public restaurants and private homes, supporting loads as heavy as 450 kg (1000 lbs).

== Regulations governing construction and operation ==
Building codes have regulated the construction and operation of dumbwaiters in parts of North America since the 19th century. Modern dumbwaiters in the United States and Canada must comply with American Society of Mechanical Engineers (ASME) codes and, therefore, have features similar to those of passenger elevators. The construction, operation and usage of dumbwaiters varies widely according to country.

== In history ==
Margaret Bayard Smith wrote that former U.S. President Thomas Jefferson had kept dumbwaiters at both the White House and his Monticello estate whenever she visited him at both places. She also wrote that these dumbwaiters were built to reduce the number of servants required near dining rooms, allowing more privacy in conversations which might include sensitive information.

After defecting from the Soviet underground in 1938, Whittaker Chambers gave a stash of stolen documents to his nephew-in-law, Nathan Levine, who hid them in a dumbwaiter in his mother's house in Brooklyn. A decade later, Chambers asked his nephew to retrieve them (which Chambers referred to as his "life preserver"). Handwritten and typewritten papers therein came from Alger Hiss and Harry Dexter White (and became known as the "Baltimore Documents"). Microfilm contained therein was subpoenaed and sensationalized (misnamed the "Pumpkin Papers" in the press) by Richard M. Nixon for HUAC.

== In popular culture ==
- A dumbwaiter is a key element of Harold Pinter's 1960 play The Dumb Waiter.
- Curly Howard breaking a dumbwaiter is the recurring gag in the Three Stooges shorts Three Little Pigskins and Nutty but Nice.
- In Home Alone 3 (1997), Home Alone 4 (2002), and Zathura: A Space Adventure (2005), dumbwaiters are important plot elements.
- In Littlest Pet Shop (2012-2016), Blythe Baxter uses a dumbwaiter in her bedroom to travel downstairs to the Littlest Pet Shop.
- In the horror film Ready or Not (2019), one of the maids in the mansion gets crushed to death on a dumbwaiter.
- In the horror TV shows The Watcher (2022 TV series) and The Haunting of Hill House (TV series).

== Gallery ==
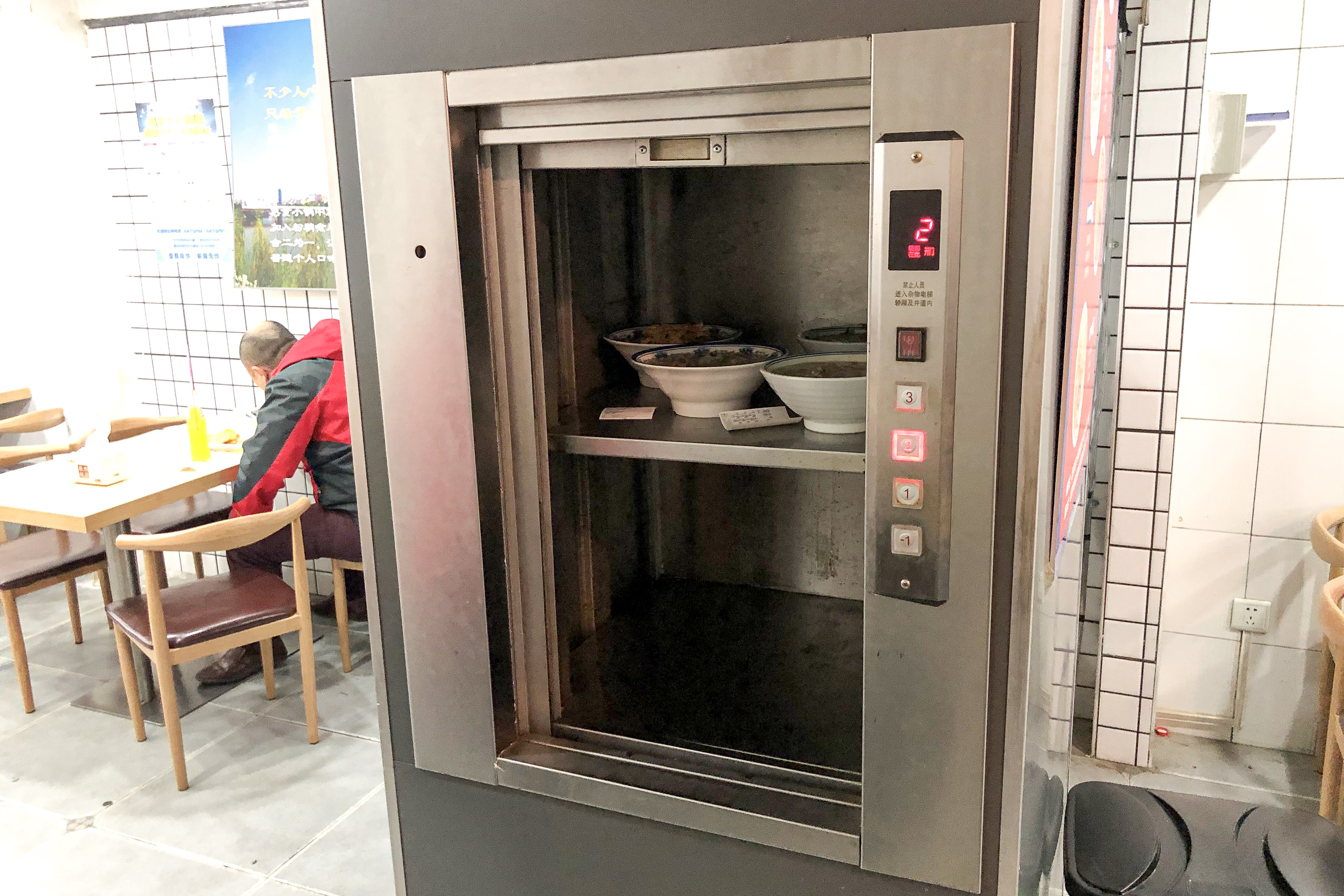
A dumbwaiter in China

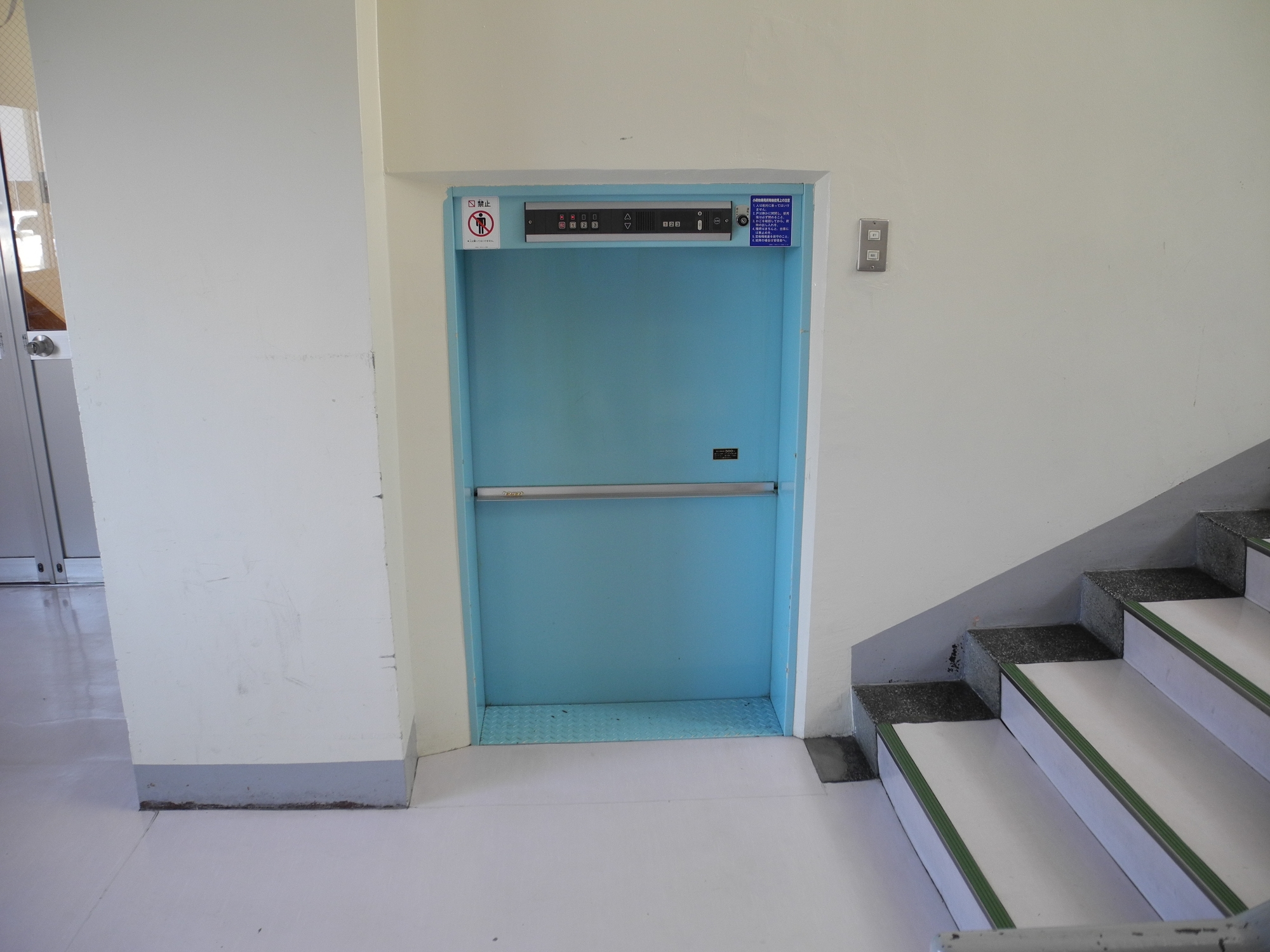
In Japan

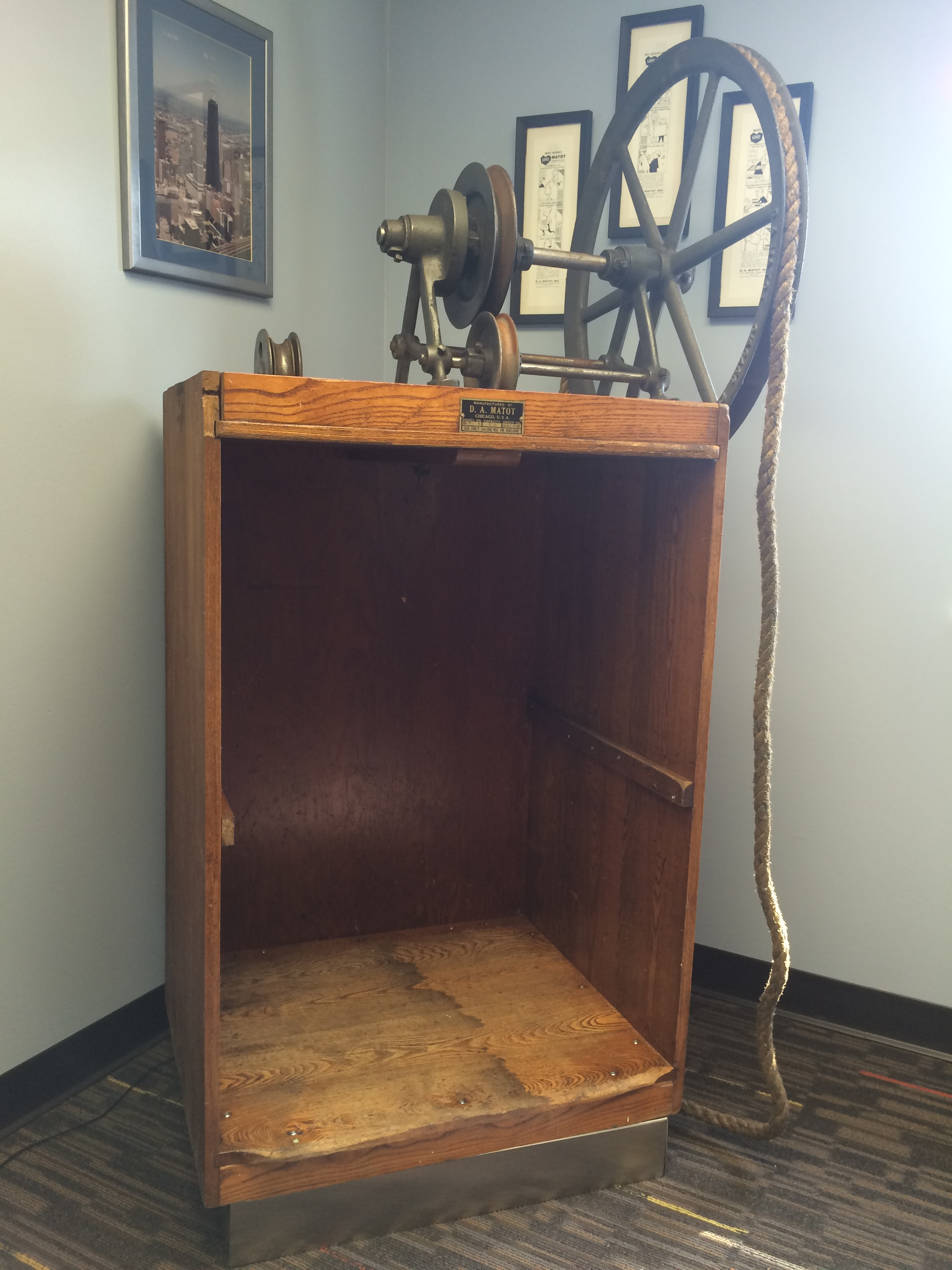
Matot rope-pulled dumbwaiter, circa 1940

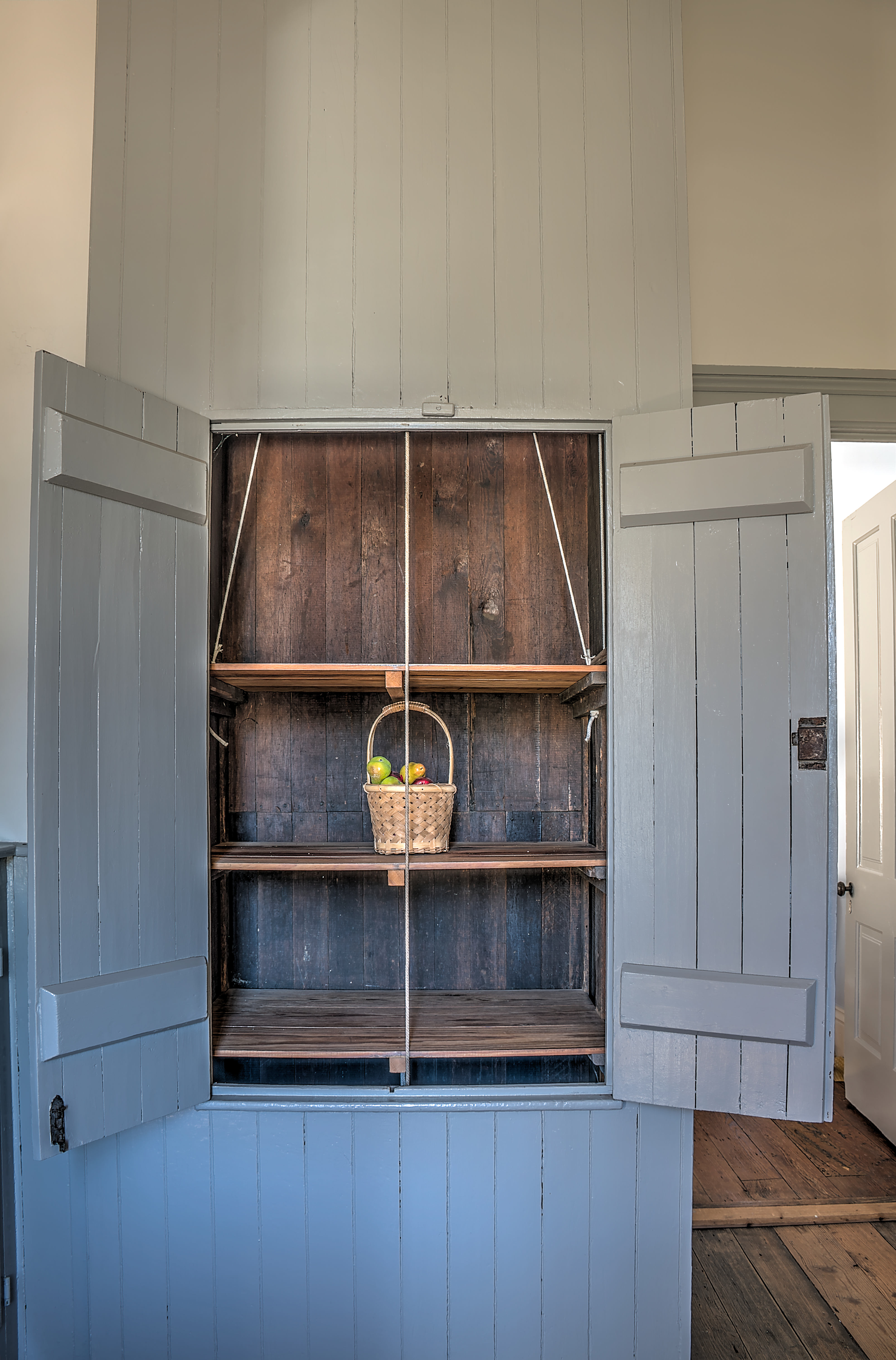
Robert Toombs House
