= Safetray =

- Inventor: Alison Grieve
- Inception: 2009
- Manufacturer: Safetray Products Ltd
- Available: Available
- Current supplier: safetrayproducts.com
- Website: Official website

Safetray is a brand name for a retractable finger receiver incorporated into the underside of a round wait staff tray to assist in handling the tray when carrying food and drinks for service in the hospitality industry. The handclip design provides leverage, helping to prevent toppling. The Safetray, invented in 2009, is now sold worldwide by Edinburgh-based Safetray Products Ltd.

== History ==
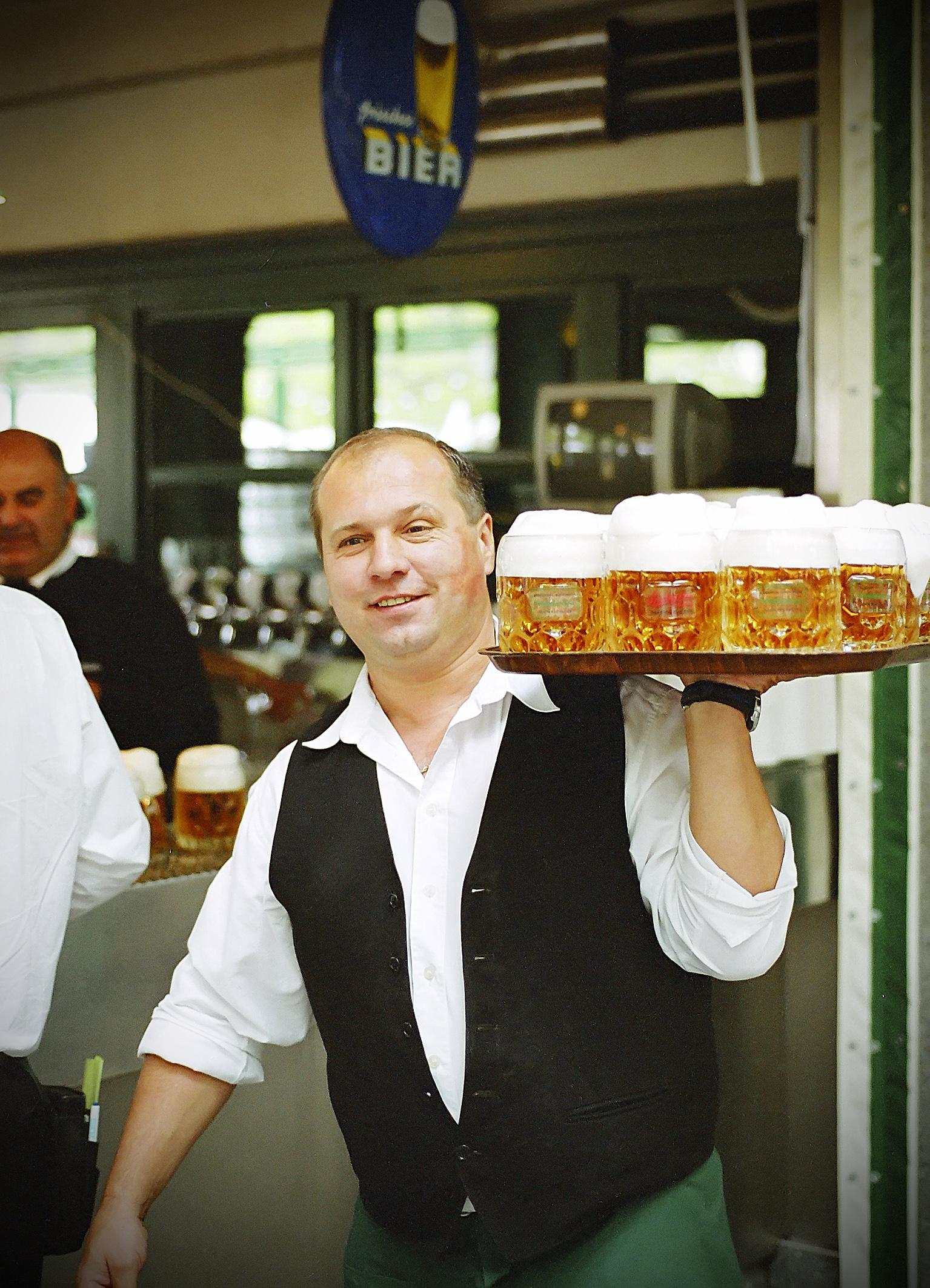
Waiter using only friction to retain a waitperson service tray in Vienna, Austria

Wait staff trays are typically large circular disks used to serve drinks and/or food to people in restaurants, bars, and other hospitality industry businesses. The waiter or waitress carries the tray with the open palm of one hand placed underneath, in about the center of the tray, relying on dry friction between the hand and the smooth metal or plastic undersurface of the tray to retain control of the tray. Occasionally, the tray may slide from the waitperson's hand, and the contents crash to the floor. In a May 2012 survey of food industry servers, those responding revealed nearly 25 per cent of staff that work or have worked in the hospitality industry have suffered an injury as a result of a toppled serving tray. Of those people questioned, 23 per cent had burned or cut themselves while trying to serve drinks or food from a serving tray.

Different devices have been developed in an effort to assist waitstaff in stabilising the service trays. Inventors have tried techniques such as attaching finger knobs/hubs (1998) and removable hand posts (2010) that protrude from the underside of the tray. They also tried the use of finger insertion holes in the tray to stabilize the tray. To restrain the hand to the underside of the tray, inventors have looked into devices such as a hand panel allowing insertion of two fingers of a hand (1985), a separately-fingered digit forward-retention device (1999), and a stretchable strap that forms a loop into which the user's fingers are inserted (2003).

=== Design and development ===
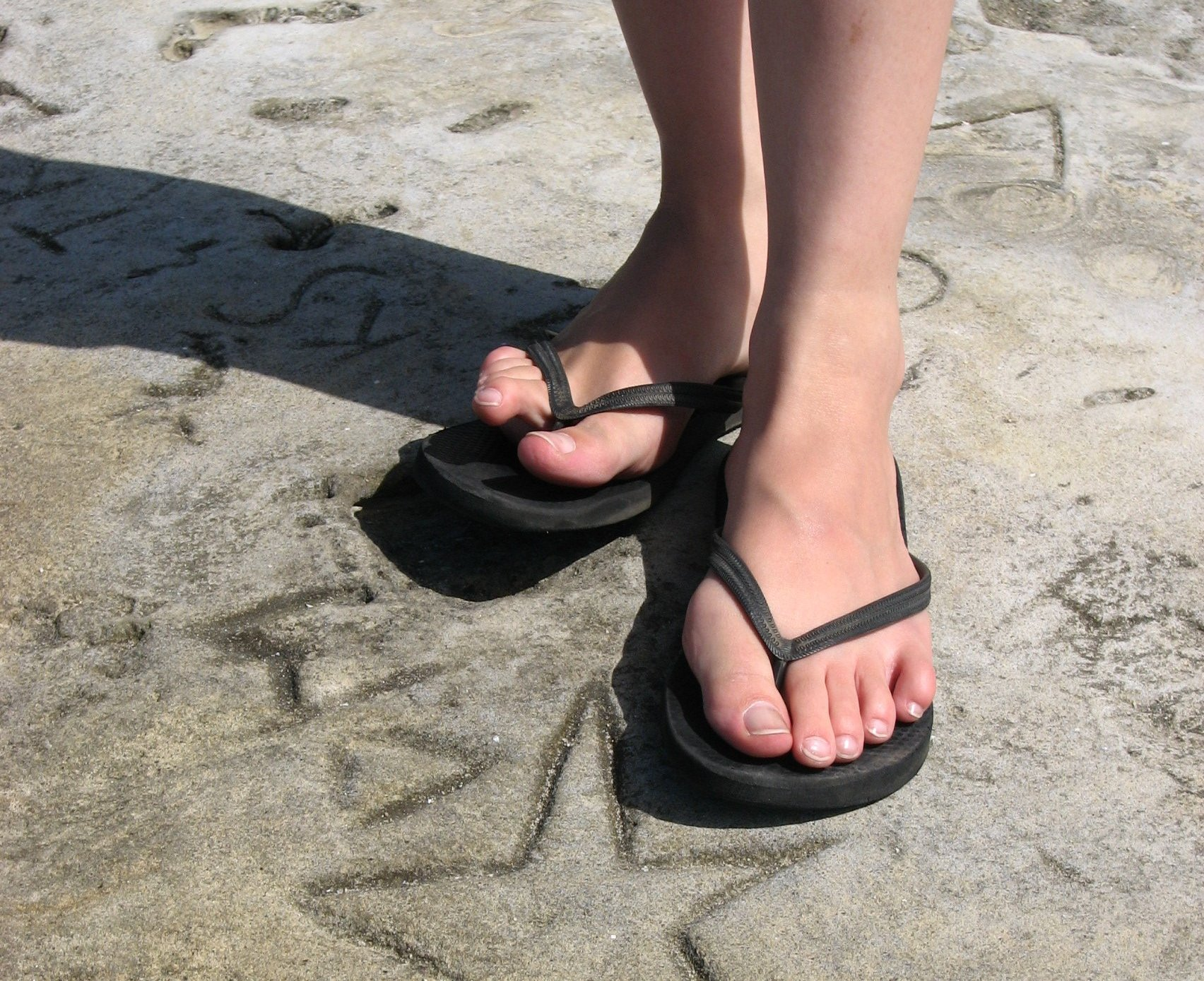
The Safetray brand serving tray product attaches a wait staff tray to the hand using a concept similar to how flip-flops attach to the foot.

In December 2009 Alison Grieve, a 32-year-old waitress and event manager from Bruntsfield, Edinburgh, witnessed a waitress drop a tray full of glasses of champagne at a corporate event for a delegation of international lawyers. To address how a tray could right itself at the moment of impending tilt, Grieve, a first-time inventor with a university background in 'History of film and photography', developed a finger receiver attached to the bottom of a wait tray based on first-principle physics, load dispersal, and counter movement. In a closed position, the finger receiver lays flush with the bottom of the wait tray so that the tray can sit on the surface of a bar or table without wobbling and can be stacked onto other trays. When the device is open, two slots can be accessed into which a waitperson may secure their two inside fingers, similar to how a flip-flop structurally attaches itself between the toes of the foot to counter the large stresses place upon it. The Safetray product's arrangement creates a strong cantilever advantage for the waitperson to allow them additional control over torque caused by items placed in various locations around the tray. The stability achieved with the Safetray product allows a waitperson to place a bottle of wine right at the edge of the tray while still keeping the tray in a horizontal position by reacting instinctively against the bottle's off-balance downward force.

=== Intellectual property and publicity ===
Grieve filed for a Great Britain patent in March 2010 and began seeking investors. By April she had formed Safetray Products Limited, which sought to register the intellectual property "safetray, safetray," as a trademark in the United Kingdom, and sent 2,500 Safetray devices throughout a Scotland hospitality chain as part of a testing process. In August 2010, seeking to secure financing from a panel of venture capitalists, Grieve appeared with the Safetray device on a Dragons' Den-style "Brand of the Future" competition at the Edinburgh International Marketing Festival. Bill Jamieson, writer for The Scotsman and a judge at the competition, noted that the product was a step towards making drink service trays in hotels and bars spill-proof. The Safetray device lost the competition to a company that turns discarded plastic into chairs, lighting, and other eco-focused products. A month later, Safetray Products Ltd uploaded the first of several Safetray promotional videos to YouTube. In 2011, Safetray Products Ltd won the Marketing 4 Start-Up Britain award at a competition run by the Marketing Agencies Association and the Government-backed StartUp Britain initiative and the company received creative ideas and marketing advice free of charge for a year from Iris Worldwide.

=== Sales ===
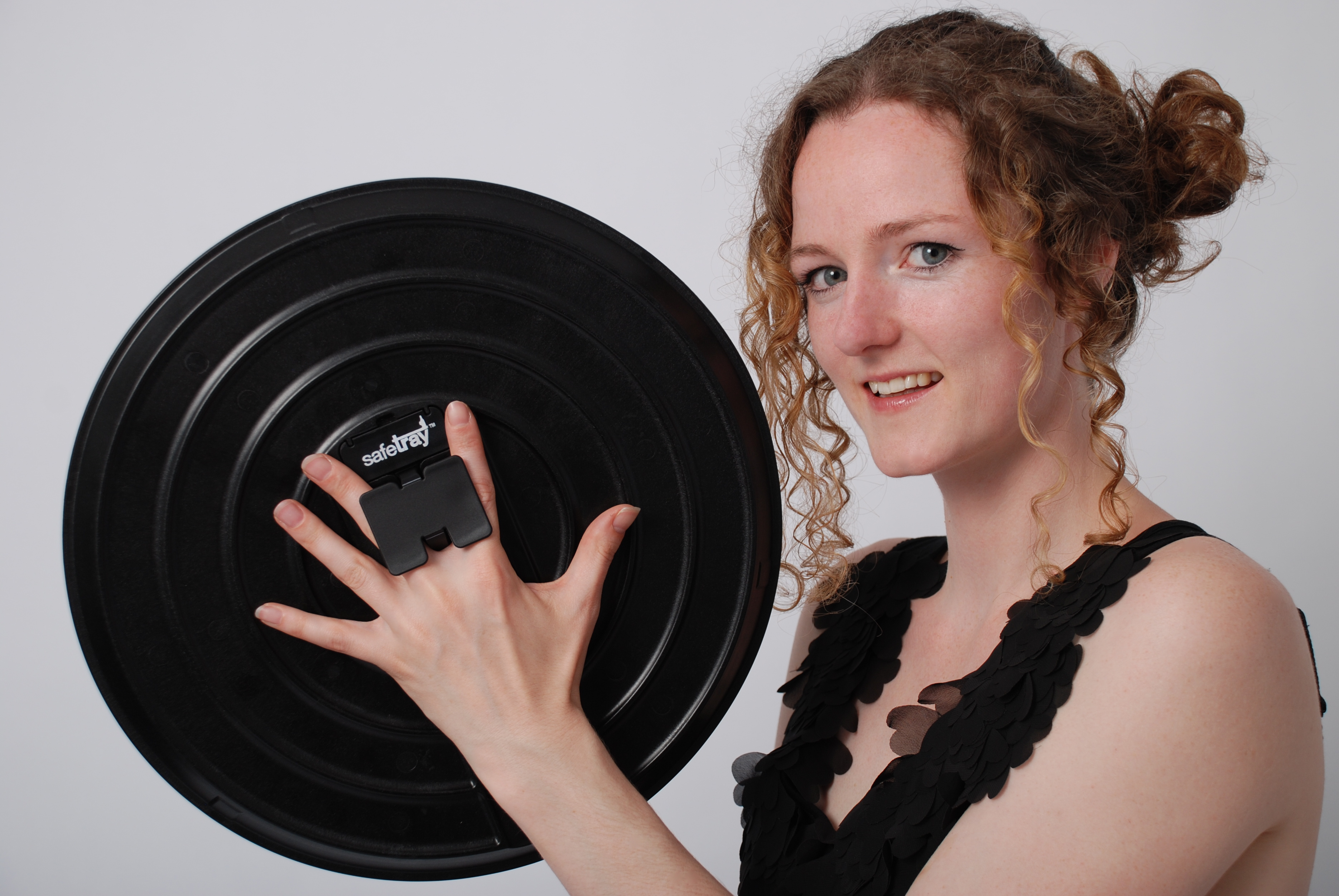
Inventor Alison Grieve holds a Safetray

By June 2011, the Safetray device was being manufactured in China to meet orders that had been placed by customers throughout Europe and across America. In December 2011, after the Safetray product had been exhibited at trade shows in Las Vegas and Chicago, Safetray Products Ltd had sold 3,000 units worldwide for around £16 each (about US$25) and was awarded contracts to supply the device to the Four Seasons Hotels and Resorts, Sodexo, and Compass Group. Grieve, on behalf of Safetray Products Ltd, received £200,000 (US$310,000) from an investor syndicate composed of investment group Equity Gap and individual investors. She used the money to strengthen the worldwide patent protection of the product, expand its markets to United Arab Emirates and United States hotels, and shift mass production of the now eco-friendly Safetray product from China to the McLaren Plastics factory in Loanhead, a small town in Midlothian, Scotland, creating four new permanent jobs in that municipality. The company was valued at £1 million ($1.5 million US dollars) at the end of 2011.

In February 2012, Safetray Products Ltd exhibited the product in the Scottish Development International pavilion at the Dubai, UAE Gulfood Exhibition 2012, a large annual food and hospitality show. In April the company hired the law firm of Baker Hostetler of Washington, DC, to seek trademark protection in the United States for the mark "SAFETRAY," with a design of a bottle and glass supported at a distance from and above the letter T in the Safetray name. In June First Minister of Scotland Alex Salmond honored Grieve's Safetray innovation and business success at the 2012 Business in the Parliament Conference.

== See also ==
- Waiters' Race
