= Turntable (disambiguation) =

Turntable may refer to:

- Lazy Susan or turntable, a rotating tray
- Revolving stage in stagecraft for theater

== Music ==
- Turntable, the circular rotating platform of a phonograph (a.k.a. record player, gramophone, turntable, etc.), a device for playing sound recordings.
- Turntablism, using the device as a modern musical instrument
- "Turntable" (song), a song by TLC from 3D
- "Turntables" (song), a song by Ciara from Fantasy Ride
- Turntable.fm, an interactive music-sharing service

== Transport ==
- Railway turntable, a device used at some railroad facilities to turn locomotives or other rolling stock around
- Car turntable, a motorized or manual device, usually installed in a driveway or on a garage floor, that rotates a motor vehicle to facilitate an easier or safer egress of the vehicle and/or eliminate backing up
- Turntable, a part of an articulated bus or other vehicle directly over pivoting joint, which preserves continuity of a floor during articulation
