= Serving cart =

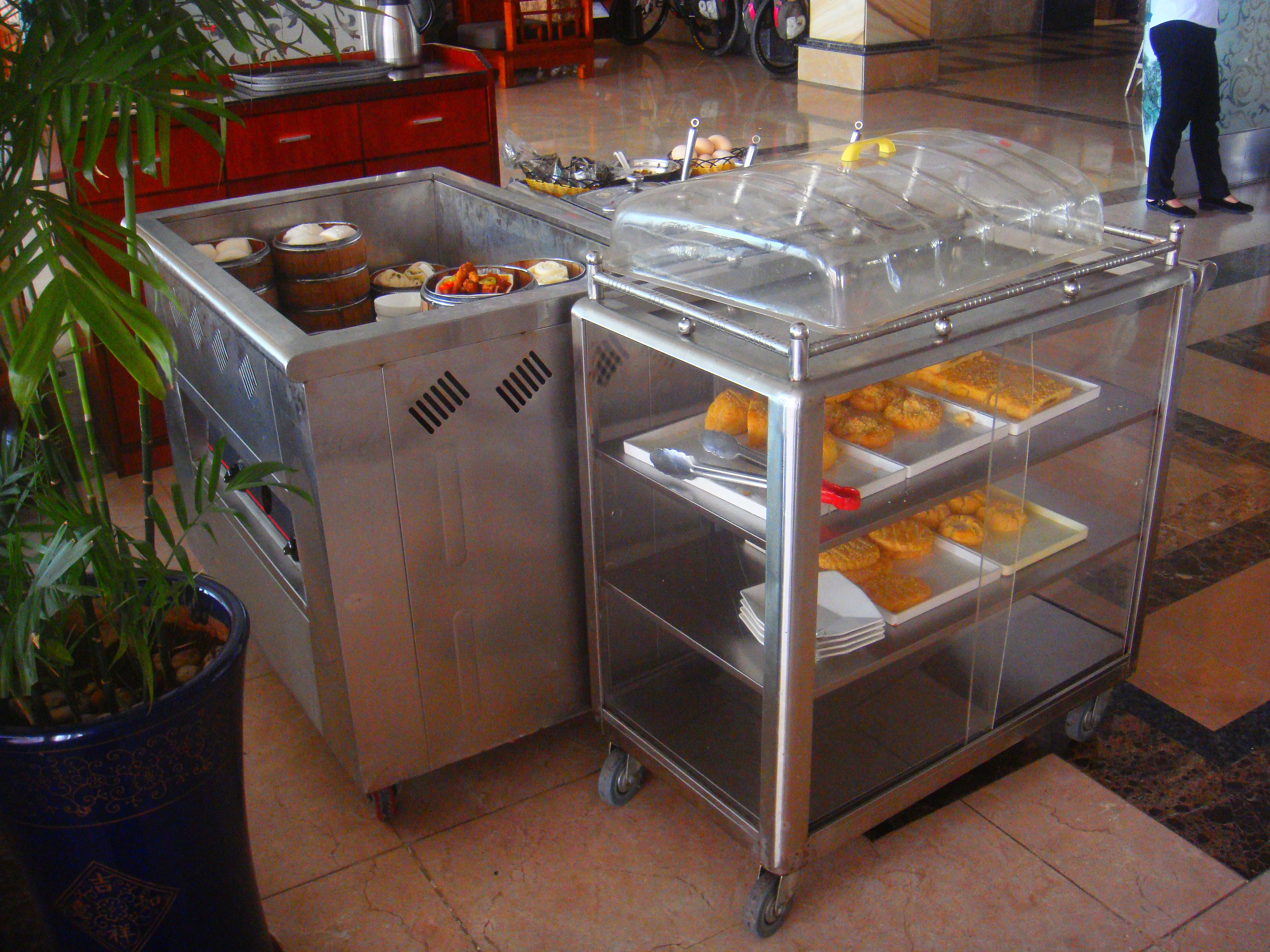
Serving carts with dim sum and breakfast pastries

A serving cart is a kind of smaller food cart. It is typically used by restaurants to deliver or display food.

Serving carts are also used in households, airplanes, and trains.

== Types ==
- Dessert cart (known as a sweet trolley in the UK) – This is mainly used in restaurants where it is wheeled from table to table allowing customers to select a dessert.
- Dim sum cart – Used in Chinese restaurants, this type of cart contains a steam table to keep the bamboo steamers hot. It may be wheeled by servers from table to table or be stationary.
- Cocktail or wine cart
- Airline service trolley – This standardized cart contains numerous shelves to hold passenger meals. The top surface may be used for beverages.
- Guéridon trolley – Used in tableside guéridon service to prepare or finish dishes.
- Hostess trolley - Used to move prepared food dishes to the dining table

== Gallery ==
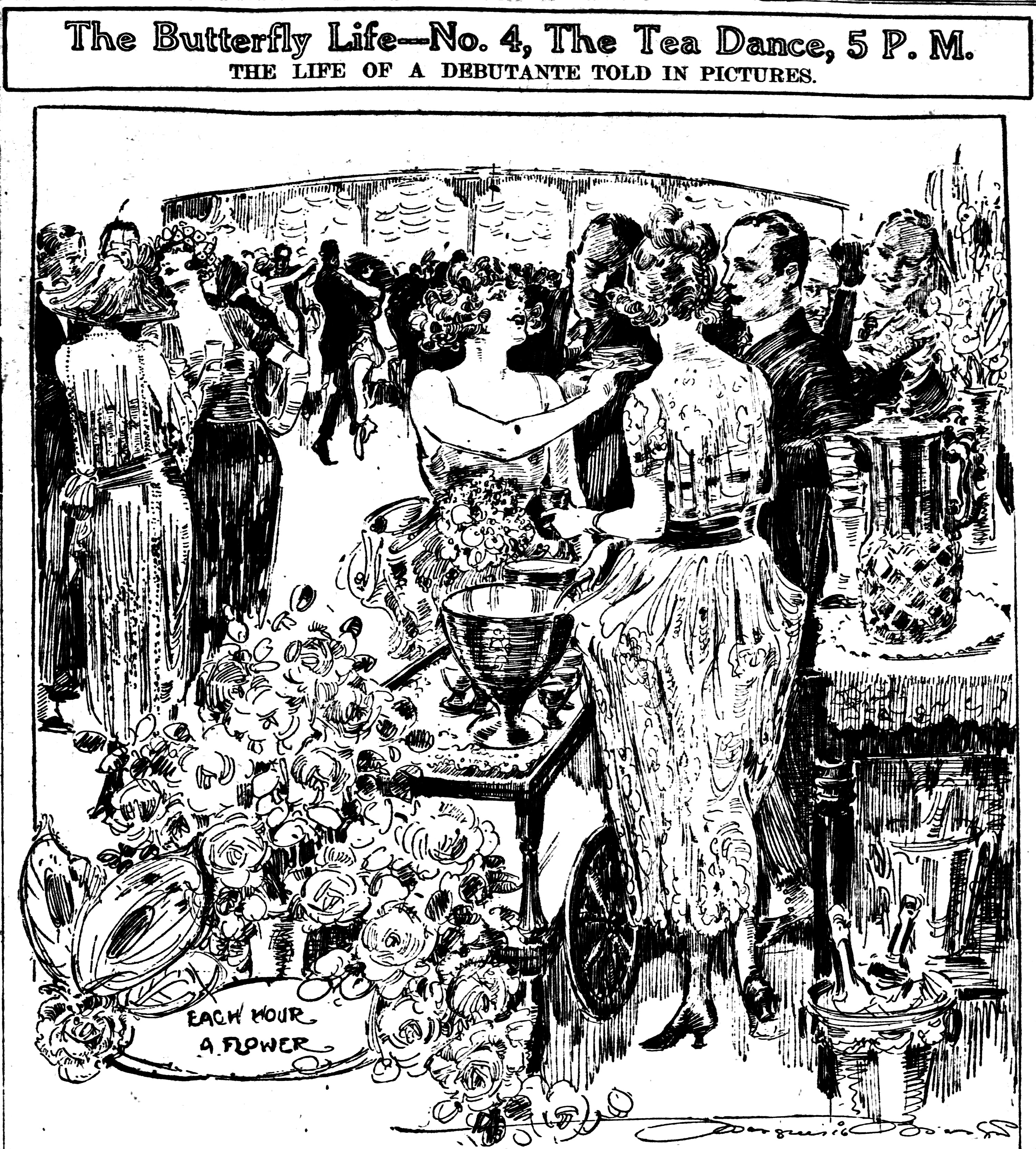
Cocktail-cart service in drawing by Marguerite Martyn, 1920

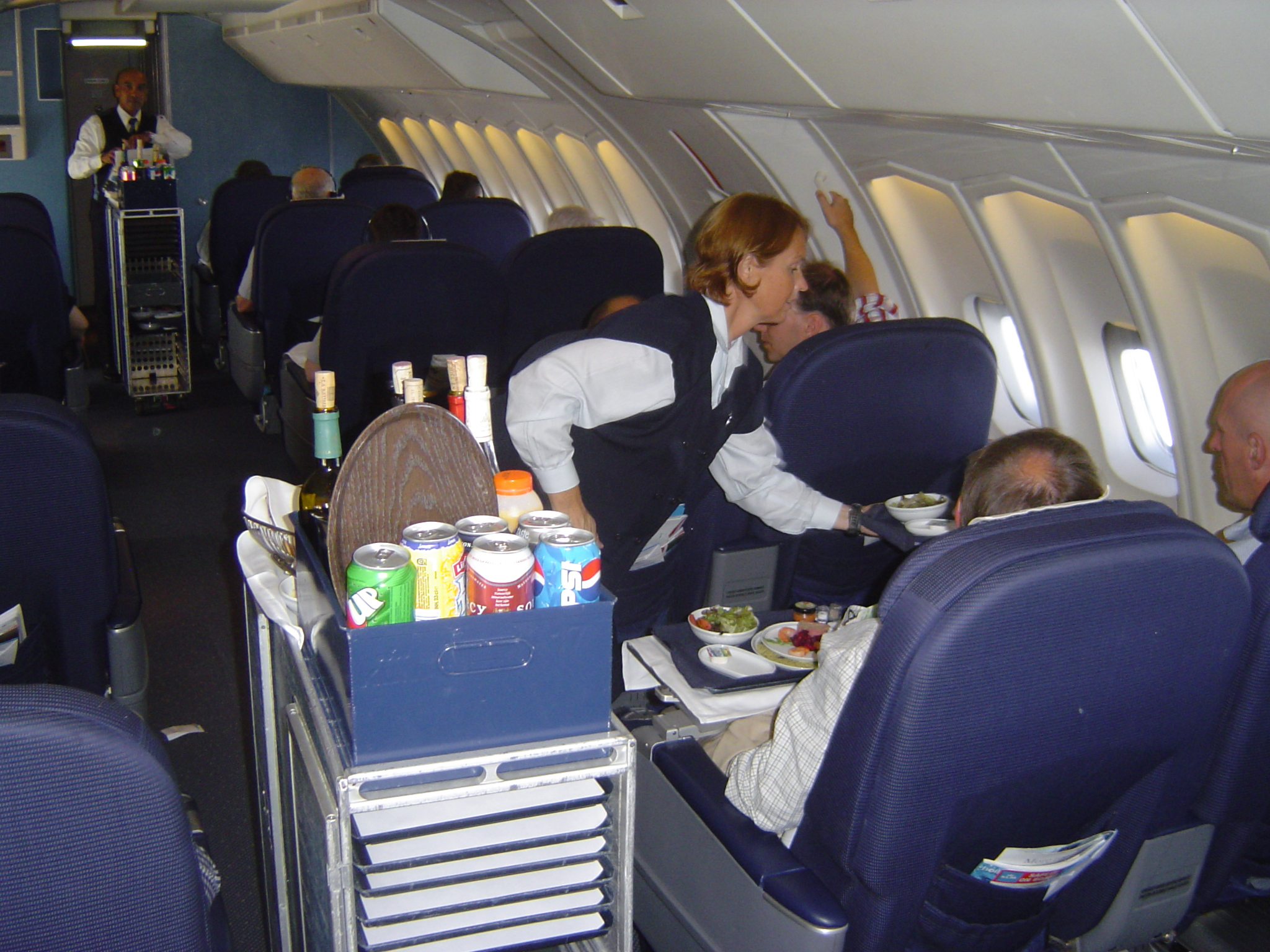
Airline service trolley, about 2004

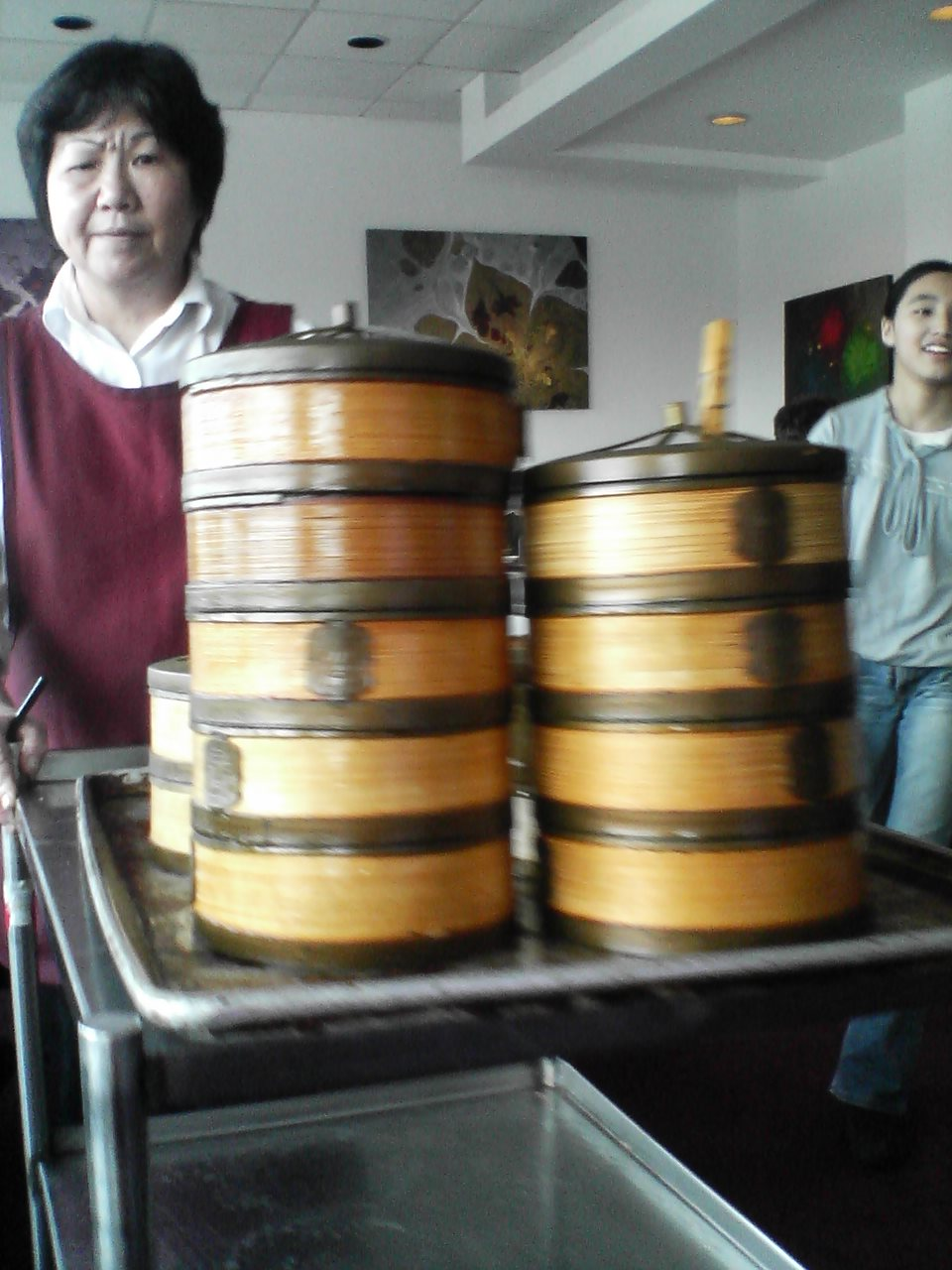
Dim sum serving cart in Chicago, 2006

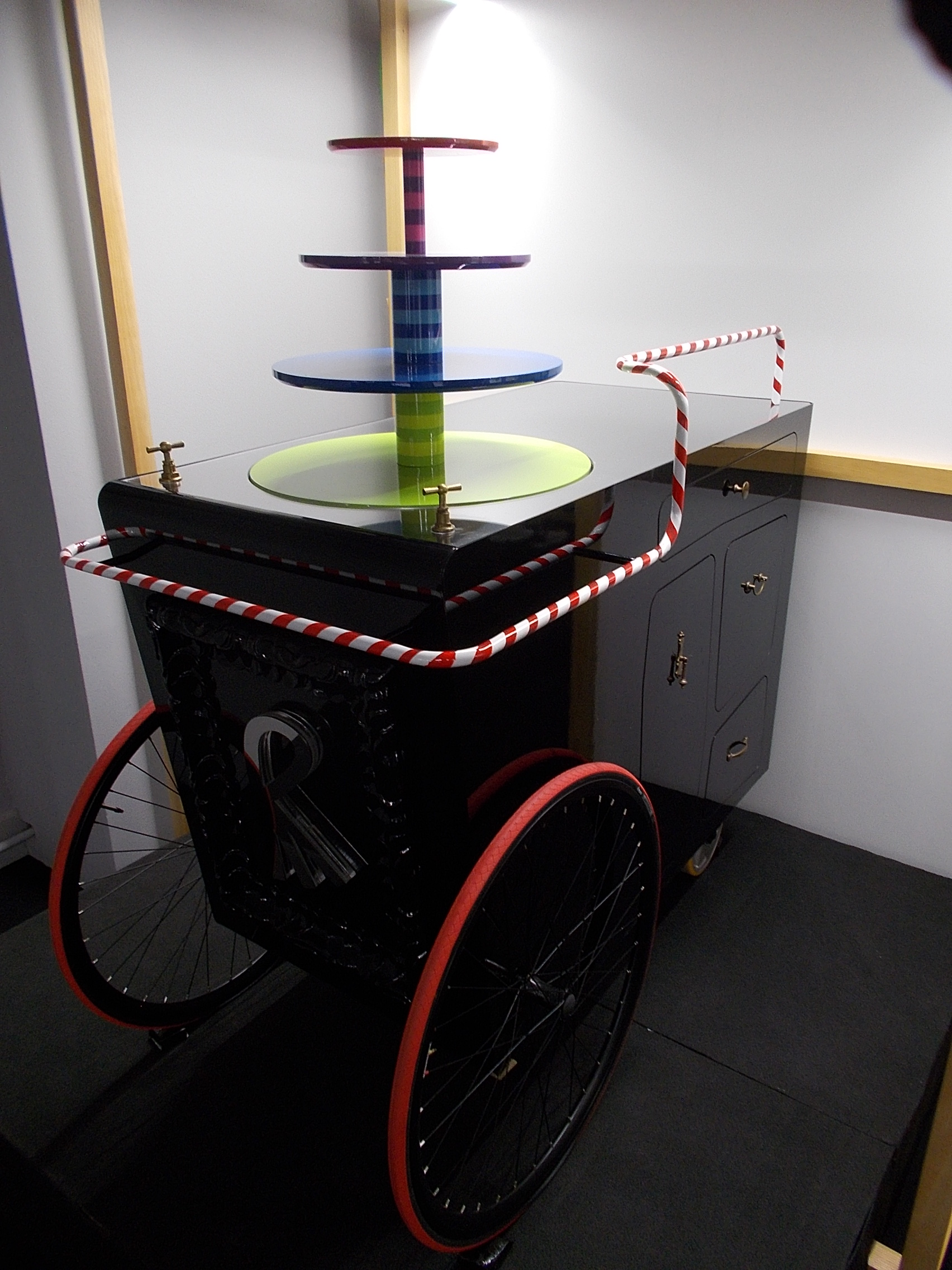
A wheeled dessert cart in a Budapest museum, 2014

== See also ==
- Food cart – a mobile kitchen that is set up on the street to facilitate the sale and marketing of street food to people
- Lazy Susan
- List of restaurant terminology
- Tray
- TV tray table
