= Airline service trolley =

Serving cart used by flight attendants

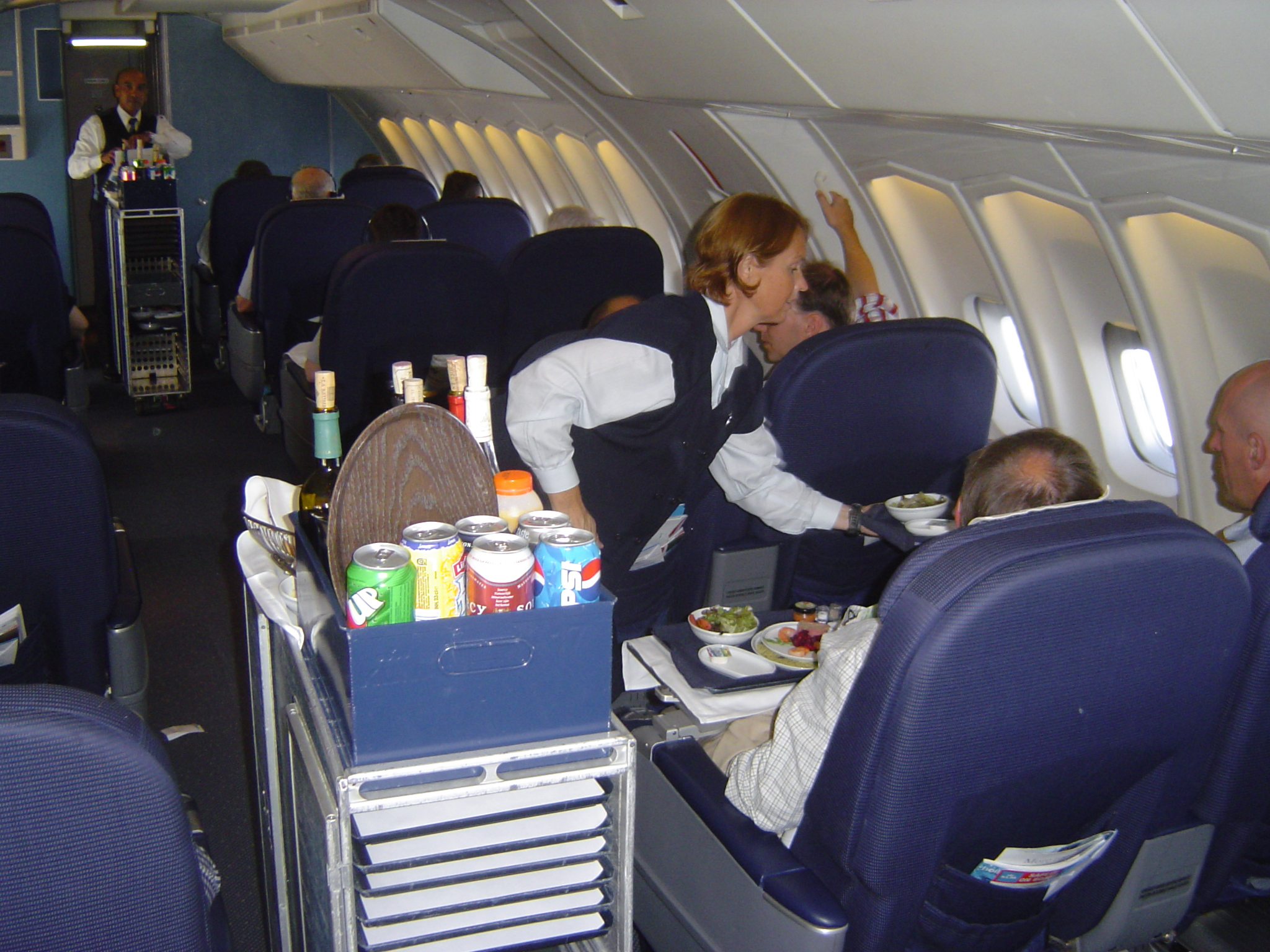
Cabin attendants using service trolleys.

An airline service trolley, also known as an airline catering trolley, airline meal trolley, or trolley cart, is a small serving cart supplied by an air carrier for use by flight attendants inside the aircraft for transport of beverages, airline meals, and other items during a flight.

== History ==
The airline service trolley system was introduced in the late 1960s at the same time as a new generation of large "widebody" aircraft were entering into service with the airlines. The significantly larger number of passengers on these aircraft meant that meals could no longer be efficiently delivered by hand, as they had been until that time.

The growth of at-seat service on long distance rail has led to the adoption of similar service trollies for this purpose.

== Design ==
The trolley is a rigid box form with castering wheels at each corner that can be braked to hold the trolley in position. Full and half size trollies are made. The front (both full and half size) and rear (full size only) have doors, and handles are provided at the top. There are currently several design families of trolley in use:

- ACE – mainly used by British Airways which originated the specification, and produced by Driessen
- ATLAS – the most common size, used by approximately 80% of airlines. It was named for the initial group of carriers who originated the specification: Alitalia, TAP, Lufthansa, Air France, and Sabena.
- KSSU – named for KLM, Swissair, SAS Scandinavian Airlines, and UTA; also used by Cathay Pacific

Individual carriers often customize an existing trolley family for their uses.

Full size ATLAS trolleys are generally about 0.3 m (11 3/4 in) wide, 1.03 m (3 ft 4 1/2 in) tall, 0.81 m (2 ft 7 7/8 in) long, and weigh about 15 kg (33 lb) unladen. Lighter weight designs are also available and they also exist in half size (0.405 m (1 ft 3 15/16 in) long)

== See also ==
- Aircraft ground handling
- Galley
- Trolley (disambiguation)
