= Bahre Hasab =

Ethiopian Orthodox method of calculating religious observances

Bahire Hasab (Amharic: ባሕረ ሐሳብ), also spelled Bahre Hasab or Bahire Hasab, is the traditional system of calendrical computation used in the Ethiopian Orthodox Tewahedo Church and the Eritrean Orthodox Tewahedo Church to determine the dates of Easter (Fasika) and other movable religious observances. The system combines elements of the Alexandrian and Coptic traditions with the Ethiopian calendar and its ecclesiastical calculations.

The name is commonly translated as "Sea of Reckoning" or "Sea of Computation". The system is traditionally associated with the scholar known as Abushakir (Abū Shākir), whose chronological writings contributed to the development and transmission of computistical knowledge in the region.

Bahire Hasab forms part of a broader Ethiopian tradition of calendar science concerned with the reckoning of years, months, days, lunar cycles, seasons and religious festivals. In its narrower ecclesiastical sense, it provides a mathematical method for calculating the annual date of Fasika and the sequence of movable feasts and fasts that depend on it.

== Etymology ==
The expression Bahire Hasab is derived from two words:

- Baḥr (ባሕር) means "sea".
- Ḥasab (ሐሳብ) refers to thought, reasoning, reckoning or calculation.

The expression is therefore interpreted as "Sea of Reckoning", "Sea of Ideas" or "Sea of Computation". The name reflects the breadth of the mathematical and chronological knowledge contained in the traditional system.

The term Abushakir is associated with the Arabic name Abū Shākir and the Coptic Christian scholar Abū Shākir ibn al-Rāhib, who wrote on chronology and ecclesiastical computation. Ethiopian sources and later scholarly literature associate the transmission of computistical knowledge with his writings. The terms Bahire Hasab and Abushakir are sometimes used in closely related contexts, although they do not necessarily refer to precisely the same textual or historical tradition.

== Historical background ==
=== Alexandrian origins ===
The Ethiopian Orthodox computus developed within the wider tradition of Alexandrian Christian calendar calculation. The Church of Alexandria played an important role in the development of methods for determining Easter and organizing the annual cycle of Christian feasts and fasts.

The Alexandrian tradition drew upon several earlier systems of time reckoning, including the Julian calendar and the Metonic cycle. The Metonic cycle is a period of 19 solar years that approximately corresponds to 235 lunar months. It became an important mathematical foundation for calculating ecclesiastical lunar dates.

The traditional Paschal calculation also uses a 28-year solar cycle, associated with the repetition of weekdays under the Julian calendar, and a 19-year lunar cycle. Their combination produces a 532-year period, known as the Great Paschal Cycle:

$28 \times 19 = 532$

The cycle provides a framework for organizing recurring relationships between the solar calendar, the ecclesiastical lunar calendar and the days of the week.

The development of the Alexandrian computus took place over several centuries. Although later tradition associates particular elements of Easter calculation with early Church authorities, the system evolved through a process of scholarly refinement rather than being established in its entirety at one moment.

=== Development in Ethiopia ===
Christianity became established in the Kingdom of Aksum during the fourth century. Through the historical relationship between the Ethiopian Church and the Church of Alexandria, Alexandrian and Coptic traditions of calendar calculation became influential in Ethiopia.

The Ethiopian Orthodox Church developed and preserved its own ecclesiastical literature in Ge'ez, including works concerned with chronology, astronomy and the calculation of religious dates. These works incorporated and adapted material transmitted through Coptic and Arabic Christian scholarship.

The writings associated with Abū Shākir ibn al-Rāhib, a thirteenth-century Coptic scholar, are among the important sources connected with this tradition. His chronological work, commonly known as Kitāb al-Tawārīkh ("Book of Histories"), dealt with chronological and calendrical subjects. Later Ethiopian transmission and translation of computistical material are associated with the sixteenth-century Ethiopian scholar Enbaqom.

The Ethiopian Orthodox Church historically maintained a close institutional relationship with the Coptic Orthodox Church of Alexandria. The Ethiopian Church obtained its own patriarchate in 1959, although its liturgical calendar continued to preserve the established Alexandrian-derived computational tradition.

=== Relationship with the Book of Enoch ===
The Ethiopian tradition also preserves the Book of Enoch, particularly its astronomical material in chapters 72–82. These chapters describe a schematic calendar of 364 days, organized into four quarters of 91 days.

The 364-day calendar is significant in the history of Ethiopian religious and astronomical literature. However, it should be distinguished from the 365-day and 366-day Julian-style civil calendar used in the ordinary Ethiopian calendar and from the specific ecclesiastical calculations used to determine Easter.

The presence of astronomical and calendrical material in the Book of Enoch demonstrates the broader historical interest in the organization of time within Ethiopian religious scholarship. It does not mean that the annual Easter calculation is simply derived from the 364-day calendar described in Enoch.

== The Ethiopian calendar ==
Bahire Hasab operates in relation to the Ethiopian calendar, which consists of twelve months of thirty days each and a thirteenth month, Pagume, containing five or six days.

The calendar follows a four-year leap-year cycle. In ordinary years, Pagume has five days; in leap years, it has six days. The structure resembles the Julian calendar in its treatment of leap years.

The Ethiopian year begins in Meskerem, which normally falls in September in the Gregorian calendar. Depending on the year, the beginning of the Ethiopian year falls on 11 or 12 September in the Gregorian calendar.

=== Months of the Ethiopian calendar ===
No.	Ethiopian month	Ge'ez name	Approximate Gregorian beginning
1	Meskerem	መስከረም	11 September
2	Tikimt	ጥቅምት	11 October
3	Hidar	ኅዳር	10 November
4	Tahsas	ታኅሣሥ	10 December
5	Tir	ጥር	9 January
6	Yekatit	የካቲት	8 February
7	Megabit	መጋቢት	10 March
8	Miyazya	ሚያዝያ	9 April
9	Ginbot	ግንቦት	9 May
10	Sene	ሰኔ	8 June
11	Hamle	ሐምሌ	8 July
12	Nehase	ነሐሴ	7 August
13	Pagume	ጳጉሜ	6 September

The dates in the table are approximate. The exact Gregorian correspondence depends on the Ethiopian year and its position in the leap-year cycle.

=== Ethiopian eras ===
Two chronological systems are important in Ethiopian calendar computation:

- Amete Mihret (ዓመተ ምሕረት), meaning "Year of Mercy" or "Year of Grace", is the era used for the ordinary Ethiopian calendar.
- Amete Alem (ዓመተ ዓለም), meaning "Year of the World", is a traditional world-era chronology used in ecclesiastical calculations.

For the calculations described in Bahire Hasab, the Amete Alem year is obtained by adding 5500 to the Ethiopian calendar year:

$A = E + 5500$

where:

- $A$ is the Amete Alem year.
- $E$ is the Ethiopian calendar year.

The distinction between these eras is important because the calculations of the Evangelist, Metqi and other computistical values are based on the Amete Alem year.

== Principles of the Paschal calculation ==
The central purpose of Bahire Hasab is to determine the date of Fasika, the Ethiopian Orthodox celebration of Easter.

The calculation follows the Alexandrian ecclesiastical tradition. It uses a schematic ecclesiastical lunar cycle rather than direct observation of the astronomical Moon. The date of Easter is determined in relation to the ecclesiastical Paschal full moon and the Sunday that follows it.

The traditional calculation is therefore different from an astronomical prediction of the exact lunar phase. The ecclesiastical lunar date may differ from the observed astronomical full moon by one or more days.

The calculation involves several stages:

1. Determining the Amete Alem year.
2. Identifying the Evangelist of the year.
3. Calculating the weekday of the first day of the Ethiopian year.
4. Determining the lunar-cycle position, known as Wenber.
5. Calculating Abekte and Metqi.
6. Determining the date of Nenewe.
7. Applying the prescribed intervals to obtain the movable feasts and fasts.

== Main terms ==
Term	Ge'ez	Meaning and function
Amete Alem	ዓመተ ዓለም	The traditional "Year of the World" used as the basis for the calculations.
Wengelawi	ወንጌላዊ	The Evangelist assigned to the year.
Metene Rabiet	መጠነ ራብዕ	The quotient obtained by dividing the Amete Alem year by four.
Medeb	መደብ	The remainder obtained by dividing the Amete Alem year by nineteen.
Wenber	ወንበር	The position of the year within the nineteen-year lunar cycle.
Abekte	አበቅቴ	A lunar-cycle value used in determining Metqi.
Metqi	መጥቅ	The reference date used in the calculation of Nenewe.
Elet Tewsak	እለት ተውሳክ	The weekday supplement used to calculate the date of Nenewe.
Mebaja Hamer	መባጃ ሐመር	The resulting date used to locate the beginning of the Nenewe fast.

== Mathematical calculation ==
=== 1. Amete Alem ===
The first step is to convert the Ethiopian calendar year into the Amete Alem year:

$A = E + 5500$

For example, for Ethiopian year 2018:

$A = 2018 + 5500 = 7518$

=== 2. The Evangelist of the year ===
The Evangelist, or Wengelawi, is determined by dividing the Amete Alem year by four and considering the remainder.

Remainder	Evangelist
1	Matthew
2	Mark
3	Luke
0	John

The four Evangelists are assigned cyclically:

- Matthew (ማቴዎስ)
- Mark (ማርቆስ)
- Luke (ሉቃስ)
- John (ዮሐንስ)

In this system, years with a remainder of three are leap years. The Evangelist of a leap year is therefore Luke.

=== 3. Metene Rabiet ===
Metene Rabiet is the quotient obtained by dividing the Amete Alem year by four:

$Q = \left\lfloor \frac{A}{4} \right\rfloor$

where $\lfloor x \rfloor$ denotes the integer part of a number.

The quotient is used in calculating the weekday of Meskerem 1.

=== 4. Weekday of Meskerem 1 ===
The weekday of the first day of the Ethiopian year is calculated using:

$D = (A + Q) \bmod 7$

where:

- $A$ is the Amete Alem year.
- $Q$ is Metene Rabiet.
- $D$ is the weekday remainder.

The weekday values are interpreted as follows:

Remainder	Weekday
0	Monday
1	Tuesday
2	Wednesday
3	Thursday
4	Friday
5	Saturday
6	Sunday

=== 5. Medeb and Wenber ===
The position of the year in the nineteen-year lunar cycle is determined using Medeb and Wenber.

Medeb is the remainder obtained by dividing the Amete Alem year by nineteen:

$Medeb = A \bmod 19$

Wenber is calculated by subtracting one from the Amete Alem year and taking the remainder after division by nineteen:

$Wenber = (A - 1) \bmod 19$

Wenber therefore has values from zero to eighteen.

The subtraction of one is important because the lunar-cycle positions are numbered beginning with zero.

=== 6. Abekte ===
Abekte is calculated by multiplying Wenber by eleven and taking the remainder after division by thirty:

$Abekte = (11 \times Wenber) \bmod 30$

The value of Abekte ranges from zero to twenty-nine.

=== 7. Metqi ===
Metqi is calculated by subtracting Abekte from thirty:

$Metqi = 30 - Abekte$

When Abekte is zero, Metqi is thirty.

The month in which Metqi falls is determined by its value:

- If Metqi is greater than fourteen, it falls in Meskerem.
- If Metqi is fourteen or less, it falls in Tikimt.

=== Wenber, Abekte and Metqi table ===
The following table gives the corresponding values for the nineteen positions of the lunar cycle.

Wenber	Abekte	Metqi	Month
0	0	30	Meskerem
1	11	19	Meskerem
2	22	8	Tikimt
3	3	27	Meskerem
4	14	16	Meskerem
5	25	5	Tikimt
6	6	24	Meskerem
7	17	13	Tikimt
8	28	2	Tikimt
9	9	21	Meskerem
10	20	10	Tikimt
11	1	29	Meskerem
12	12	18	Meskerem
13	23	7	Tikimt
14	4	26	Meskerem
15	15	15	Meskerem
16	26	4	Tikimt
17	7	23	Meskerem
18	18	12	Tikimt

=== 8. Weekday of Metqi ===
After determining Metqi and its month, the weekday of Metqi can be calculated from the weekday of Meskerem 1.

Let:

- $D$ be the weekday remainder of Meskerem 1.
- $M$ be the numerical value of Metqi.

If Metqi falls in Meskerem:

$W = (D + M - 1) \bmod 7$

If Metqi falls in Tikimt:

$W = (D + M + 29) \bmod 7$

The result is interpreted using the weekday table above.

=== 9. Elet Tewsak ===
Elet Tewsak is the number added to the date of Metqi to determine the date of Nenewe. Its value depends on the weekday of Metqi.

Weekday of Metqi	Tewsak
Monday	6
Tuesday	5
Wednesday	4
Thursday	3
Friday	2
Saturday	8
Sunday	7

The values are designed to move the calculation forward to the Monday on which the Nenewe fast begins.

=== 10. Mebaja Hamer and Nenewe ===
The date of Nenewe is obtained by adding Tewsak to Metqi:

$N = M + T$

where:

- $M$ is Metqi.
- $T$ is Tewsak.
- $N$ is the resulting numerical date.

If the sum is thirty, the resulting date is the thirtieth day. If the sum exceeds thirty, thirty is subtracted to obtain the day number in the following month.

The month is determined according to the month of Metqi:

- If Metqi is in Meskerem and the sum is thirty or less, Nenewe falls in Tir.
- If Metqi is in Meskerem and the sum exceeds thirty, Nenewe falls in Yekatit.
- If Metqi is in Tikimt, Nenewe falls in Yekatit.

The resulting date is known as Mebaja Hamer. Nenewe begins on a Monday.

== Movable feasts and fasts ==
Once the date of Nenewe has been established, the dates of the other movable observances are determined by adding fixed intervals to it.

Nenewe is the beginning of a major period of fasting and repentance in the Ethiopian Orthodox liturgical year. The subsequent observances are arranged in relation to this date.

=== Main movable observances ===
Observance	Ge'ez name	Interval from Nenewe	Weekday
Nenewe	ነነዌ	0 days	Monday
Great Lent	ዐቢይ ጾም	14 days	Monday
Debre Zeit	ደብረ ዘይት	41 days	Sunday
Hosanna	ሆሳዕና	62 days	Sunday
Siklet	ስቅለት	67 days	Friday
Fasika	ፋሲካ	69 days	Sunday
Rikbe Kahenat	ርክበ ካህናት	93 days	Wednesday
Erget	ዕርገት	108 days	Thursday
Peraklitos	ጰራቅሊጦስ	118 days	Sunday
Tsome Hawaryat	ጾመ ሐዋርያት	119 days	Monday
Tsome Dihnet	ጾመ ድህነት	121 days	Wednesday

The intervals are counted from the Monday of Nenewe. The dates are calculated within the Ethiopian calendar.

=== The eight Sundays of Great Lent ===
The period of Great Lent contains eight Sundays, each with its own traditional name.

Sunday	Traditional name	Interval from Nenewe
1	Zewerede	13 days
2	Qidist	20 days
3	Mikurab	27 days
4	Metsagu'e	34 days
5	Debre Zeit	41 days
6	Gebre Hermet	48 days
7	Nikodimos	55 days
8	Hosanna	62 days

The Sundays are separated by seven-day intervals. They organize the progression of the fasting period toward Holy Week and Fasika.

== Worked example: Ethiopian year 2018 ==
The following example demonstrates the calculation of the movable observances for Ethiopian year 2018, corresponding approximately to 11 September 2025 through 10 September 2026.

=== Step 1: Calculate Amete Alem ===
$A = E + 5500$

$A = 2018 + 5500 = 7518$

The Amete Alem year is therefore 7518.

=== Step 2: Determine the Evangelist ===
Divide 7518 by four:

$7518 \bmod 4 = 2$

A remainder of two corresponds to Mark.

The Evangelist of Ethiopian year 2018 is therefore Mark.

=== Step 3: Calculate Metene Rabiet ===
$Q = \left\lfloor \frac{7518}{4} \right\rfloor = 1879$

=== Step 4: Determine the weekday of Meskerem 1 ===
$D = (7518 + 1879) \bmod 7$

$D = 9397 \bmod 7 = 3$

A remainder of three corresponds to Thursday.

Meskerem 1, 2018 E.C., therefore falls on Thursday.

=== Step 5: Calculate Wenber ===
$Wenber = (7518 - 1) \bmod 19$

$Wenber = 7517 \bmod 19 = 12$

=== Step 6: Calculate Abekte ===
$Abekte = (11 \times 12) \bmod 30$

$Abekte = 132 \bmod 30 = 12$

=== Step 7: Calculate Metqi ===
$Metqi = 30 - 12 = 18$

Since eighteen is greater than fourteen, Metqi falls in Meskerem.

Metqi is therefore 18 Meskerem.

=== Step 8: Determine the weekday of Metqi ===
Since Metqi falls in Meskerem:

$W = (D + M - 1) \bmod 7$

$W = (3 + 18 - 1) \bmod 7$

$W = 20 \bmod 7 = 6$

A remainder of six corresponds to Sunday.

Metqi falls on Sunday, 18 Meskerem.

=== Step 9: Determine Tewsak ===
The Tewsak value for Sunday is seven.

$T = 7$

=== Step 10: Calculate Nenewe ===
$N = M + T$

$N = 18 + 7 = 25$

The resulting date is 25 Meskerem as a numerical sum. Under the traditional month progression used in this calculation, when Metqi falls in Meskerem and the sum does not exceed thirty, Nenewe falls in Tir.

Nenewe therefore begins on Monday, 25 Tir 2018 E.C., corresponding to 2 February 2026 in the Gregorian calendar.

=== Resulting movable observances ===
Using Nenewe as the starting point, the dates of the principal movable observances are:

Observance	Ethiopian date	Gregorian date
Nenewe	25 Tir 2018	2 February 2026
Beginning of Great Lent	9 Yekatit 2018	16 February 2026
Debre Zeit	6 Megabit 2018	15 March 2026
Hosanna	27 Megabit 2018	5 April 2026
Siklet	2 Miyazya 2018	10 April 2026
Fasika	4 Miyazya 2018	12 April 2026

This example illustrates how the system converts a year in the Ethiopian calendar into a sequence of movable religious dates through a series of mathematical operations.

== Liturgical and cultural significance ==
Bahire Hasab is an important part of the traditional liturgical organization of the Ethiopian and Eritrean Orthodox Tewahedo Churches. Its calculations determine the annual placement of major religious observances, including the fasting period before Easter, Holy Week and the celebration of the Resurrection.

The system also reflects the historical importance of calendar science in Ethiopian religious scholarship. The calculation of time was not treated only as a practical administrative activity; it was connected with biblical chronology, the organization of worship and the study of the natural world.

The traditional system has been preserved through ecclesiastical teaching, manuscripts and printed works. Knowledge of its calculations has historically been associated with religious scholars and clergy responsible for determining the annual liturgical calendar.

== Relationship with Western Easter ==
The Ethiopian Orthodox Church and most Western Christian churches use different methods and calendar conventions for calculating Easter.

The Ethiopian Orthodox calculation follows the Alexandrian tradition and uses the Julian calendar framework for its ecclesiastical reckoning. Most Western churches use the Gregorian calendar and its corresponding Paschal tables.

As a result, Ethiopian Orthodox Easter and Western Easter may fall on the same Gregorian date in some years and on different dates in others.

In the Gregorian calendar, Ethiopian Orthodox Easter generally falls between 4 April and 8 May during the period 1901–2099.

== Limitations and interpretation ==
Bahire Hasab is an ecclesiastical computus: a conventional mathematical system for organizing religious dates. It should not be understood as a modern astronomical model that predicts the exact observed position of the Moon or Sun.

Its lunar calculations use a fixed ecclesiastical cycle. Consequently, the calculated Paschal full moon is not necessarily identical to the astronomical full moon observed in the sky.

Similarly, the traditional calendar's relationship with the Julian calendar means that its dates do not always correspond directly to Gregorian calendar dates without conversion.

The system's purpose is to provide a consistent and reproducible method for determining the liturgical year, rather than to replace astronomical observation or modern civil timekeeping.

== See also ==
- Ethiopian calendar
- Eritrean calendar
- Coptic calendar
- Alexandrian calendar
- Computus
- Easter
- Julian calendar
- Metonic cycle
- Ethiopian Orthodox Tewahedo Church
- Eritrean Orthodox Tewahedo Church
- Book of Enoch
