= George W. Cannon =

American inventor of the mechanical dumbwaiter

George W. Cannon was an American inventor from New York. He is best known for the invention of the mechanical dumbwaiter. Cannon first filed for the patent of a brake system (US Patent no. 260776) that could be used for a dumbwaiter on January 6, 1883. He later filed for the patent on the mechanical dumbwaiter (US Patent No. 361268) on February 17, 1887. He is reported to have generated a vast amount of money from royalties from his dumbwaiter patents until his death in 1911.
