= Tray =

Shallow platform designed for carrying things

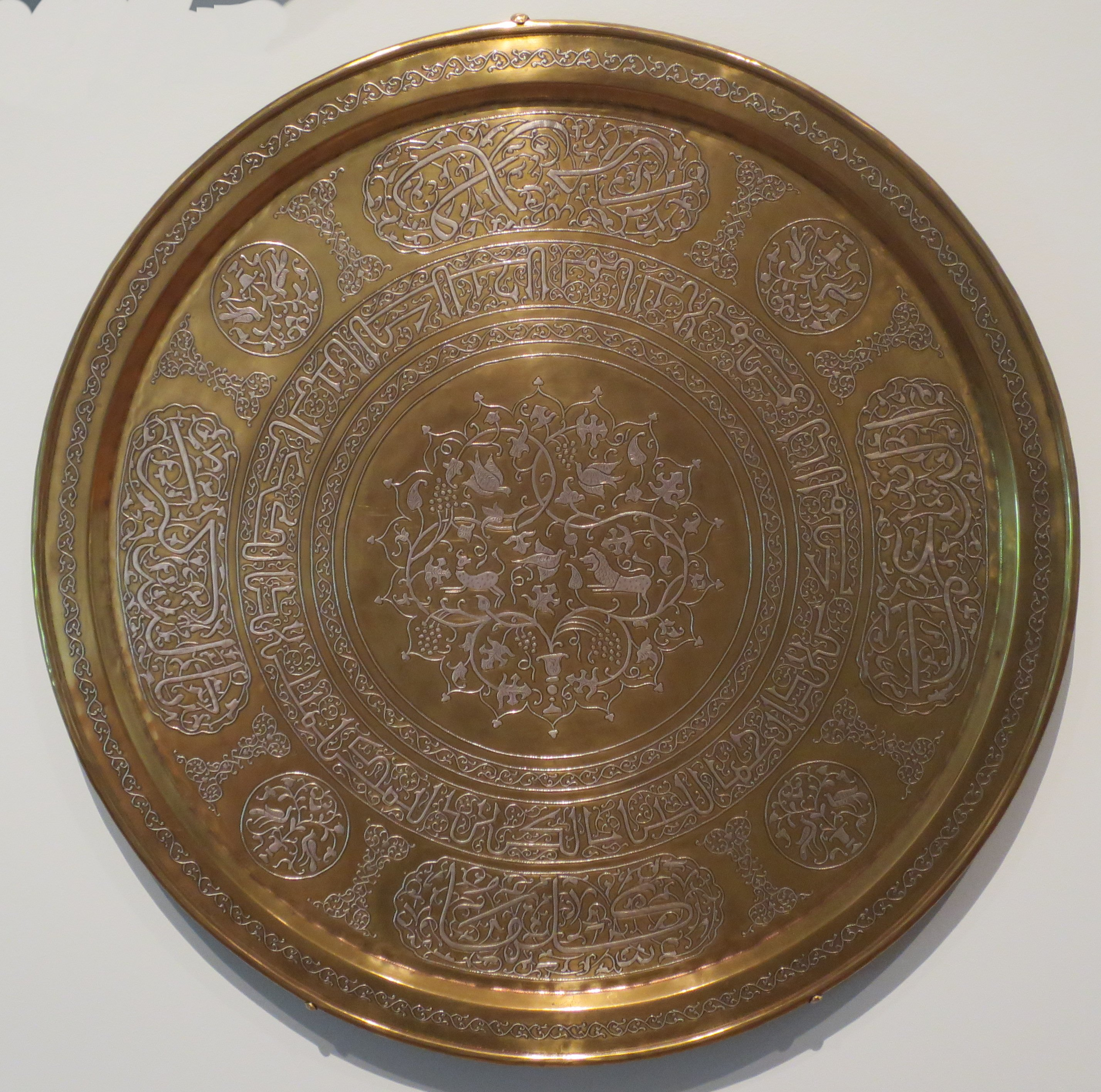
Brass tray inlaid with silver, Egypt or Syria, 19th century

A tray is a shallow platform designed for the carrying of items. It can be fashioned from numerous materials, including silver, brass, sheet iron, paperboard, wood, melamine, and molded pulp. Trays range in cost from inexpensive molded pulp trays which are disposable and inexpensive melamine trays used in cafeterias, to mid-priced wooden trays used in a home, to expensive silver trays used in luxury hotels. Some examples have raised galleries, handles, and short feet for support.

Trays are flat, but with raised edges to stop things from sliding off them. They are made in a range of shapes but are commonly found in oval or rectangular forms, sometimes with cutout or attached handles with which to carry them.

A more elaborate device is the tray table, which is designed to accommodate a tray, or to serve as a tray itself. There are two primary kinds of tray tables. The TV tray table is typically a small table, which may have legs that fold to allow it to be carried like a tray. The airplane tray table is a tray built into the back of an airline seat, which folds down so that the person sitting in the seat behind the one containing the table can use it as a surface from which to eat meals served on the airplane.

== Examples ==
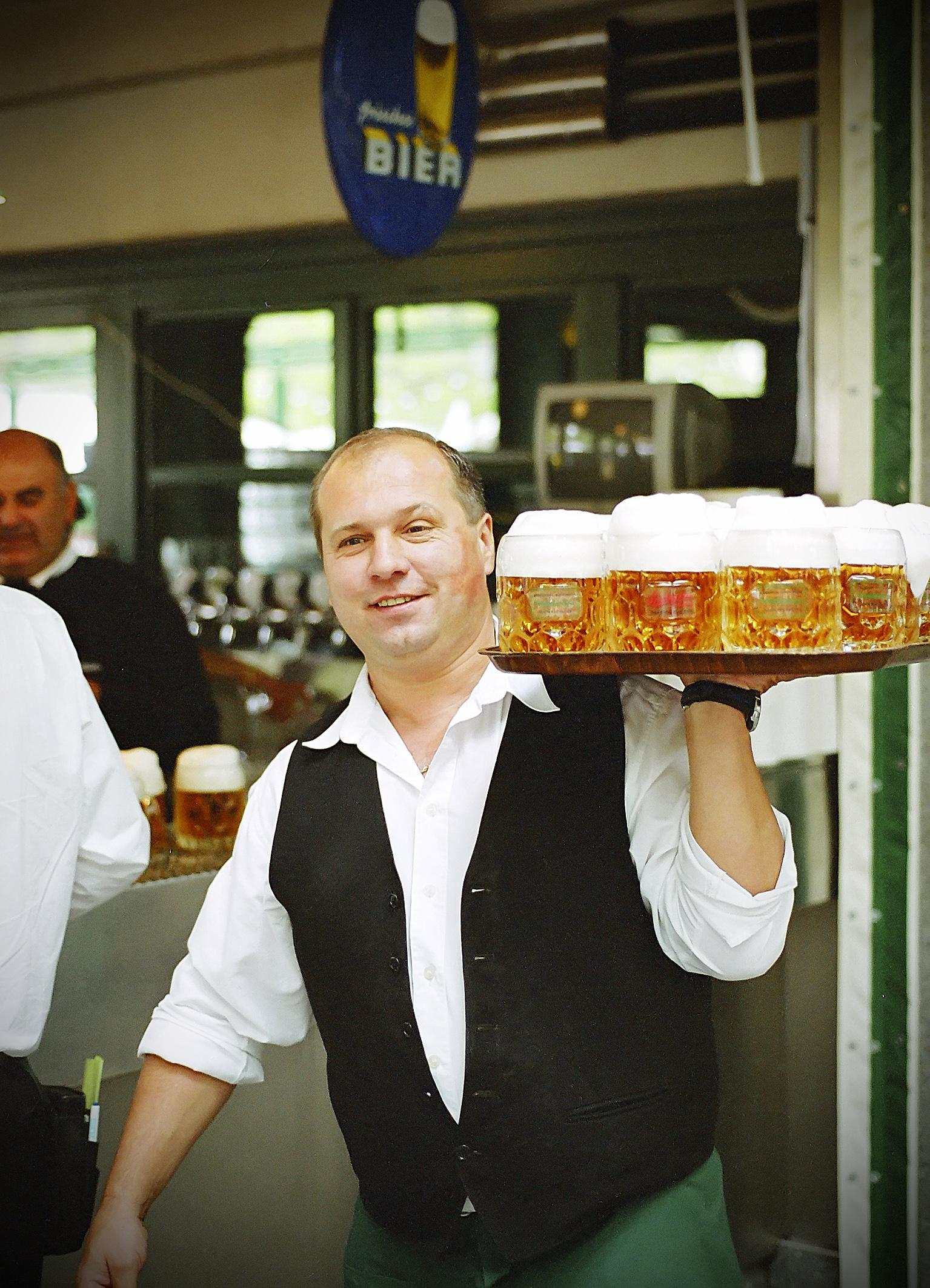
Waiter with waitperson service tray in Vienna, Austria.

- A butler's tray often has a gallery, or deeper surround, handles on the long sides to facilitate carrying (usually cut into the surround), and a portable stand with folding legs. It is used for the service of drinks and generally serves as a convenient side table.
- A cafeteria tray is used for carrying items in a cafeteria. It is typically made of plastic or fiberglass. A compartment tray or mess tray is a cafeteria tray designed to be used directly, without dishes - it incorporates shallow compartments in which different types of food are placed.
- A cargo tray, the rear of a ute, used to hold goods.
- A molded pulp tray is a disposable (or recyclable) tray provided by fast food restaurants, coffee shops and movie theaters. The tray is designed to hold four disposable cups.
- Surgical trays are used to carry surgical instruments, are rectangular and made of stainless steel to resist the heat of sterilization without corrosion.
- Seed trays are used for propagating vegetables and flowers and other plants from seed. They are also used for taking plant cuttings. The trays for seedling production are made of expanded polystyrene or polythene. They come in many sizes; the most common are the Danish and the European sized trays. Seed trays can also be stacked in seed tray racks to take up less space.
- A darkroom tray, also known as print developing tray, is used in photography.
- A dental impression tray is a receptacle or device that is used to carry impression material to the mouth, confine the material in apposition to the surfaces to be recorded, and control the impression material while it sets to form the impression.
- A baking tray or oven tray is used to cook a variety of foods in an oven, including vegetables and meats such as whole chickens. It allows food to be very exposed to the hot air inside the oven whilst preventing any fats of liquids from falling onto the oven floor. See also Sheet pan.
- Food packaging trays
  - A foam tray is used by the supermarkets and by the fruit shops to package meat and small fruits, vegetables and mushrooms. Patents for this product exist since 1966.
  - Aluminium foil take-out food tray used by the supermarkets for packaging processed food.
  - Thin plastic trays used for both packaging shelf food and for take-out food
- A coin tray is used to store or collect coins. They are used in banks, restaurants, shops, casinos, and for coin collecting.

== Image gallery ==
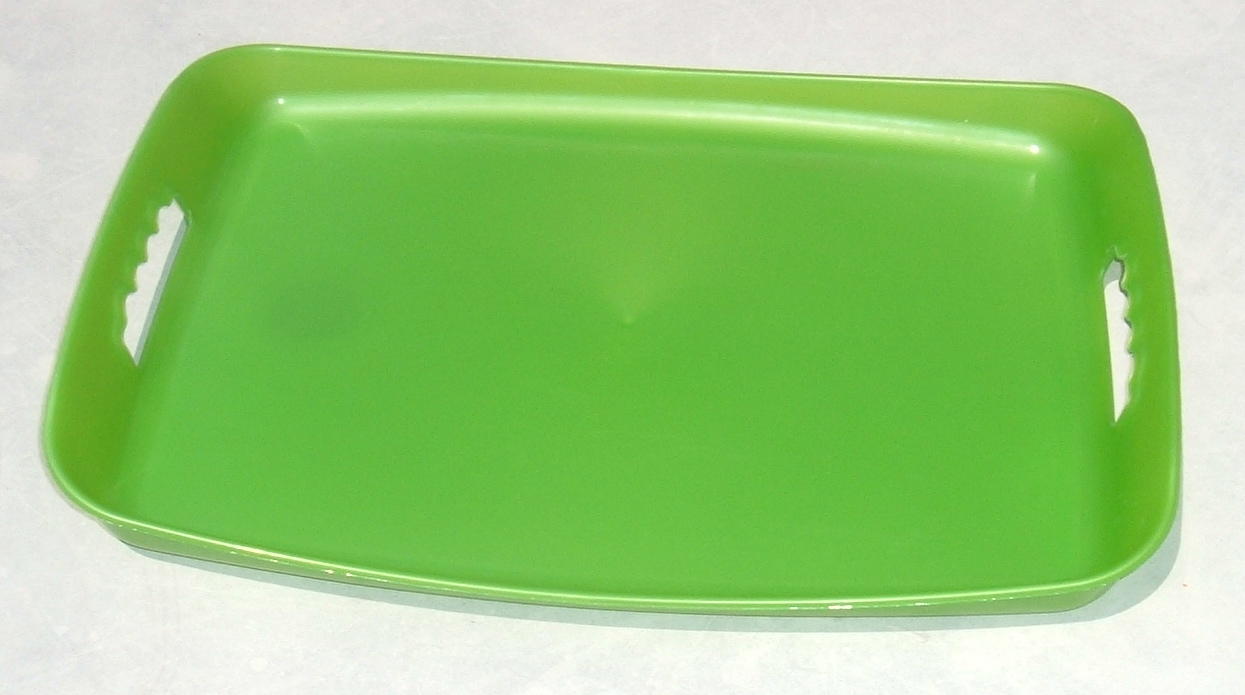
Plastic tray

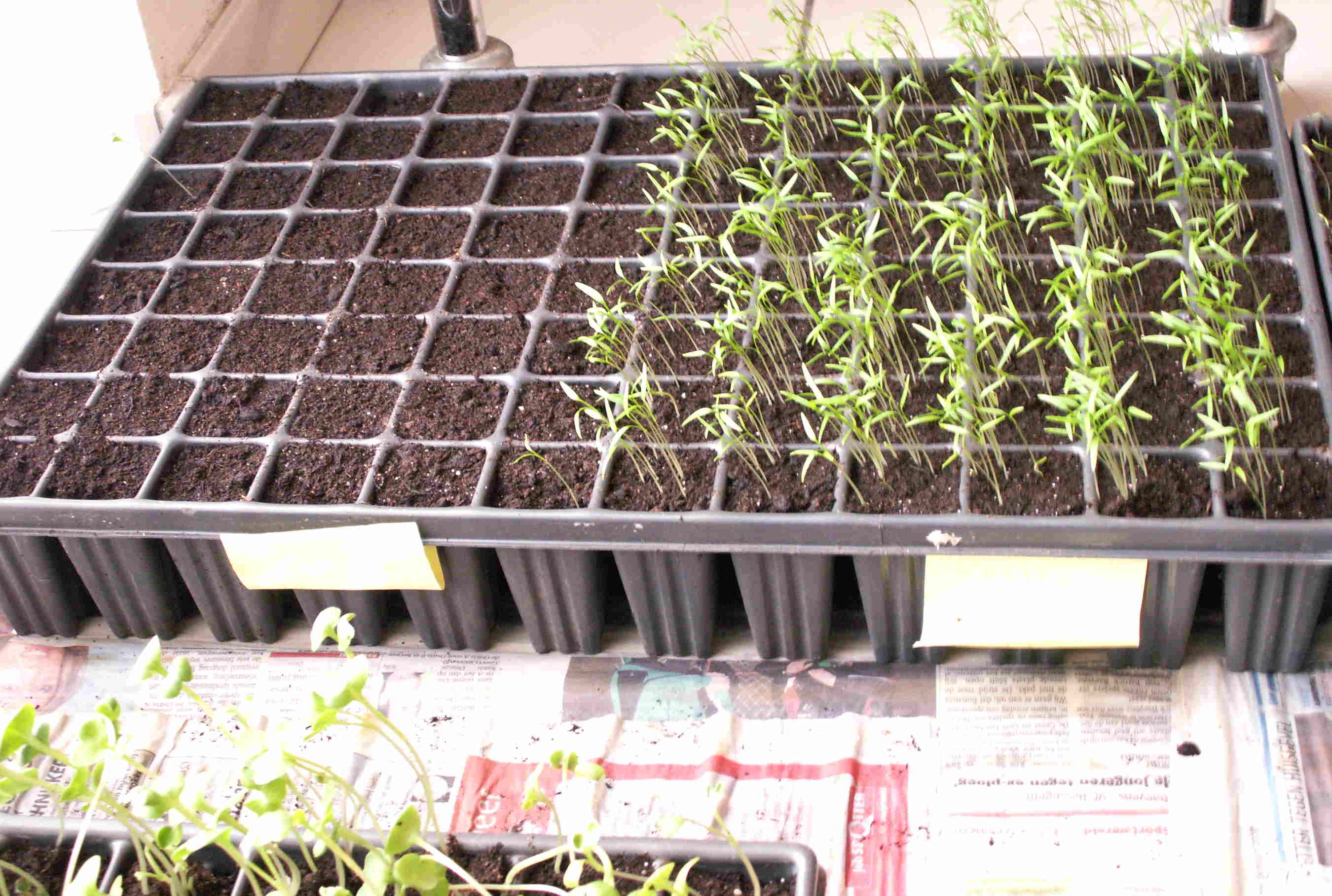
A seed tray used in horticulture for sowing and taking plant cuttings and growing plugs

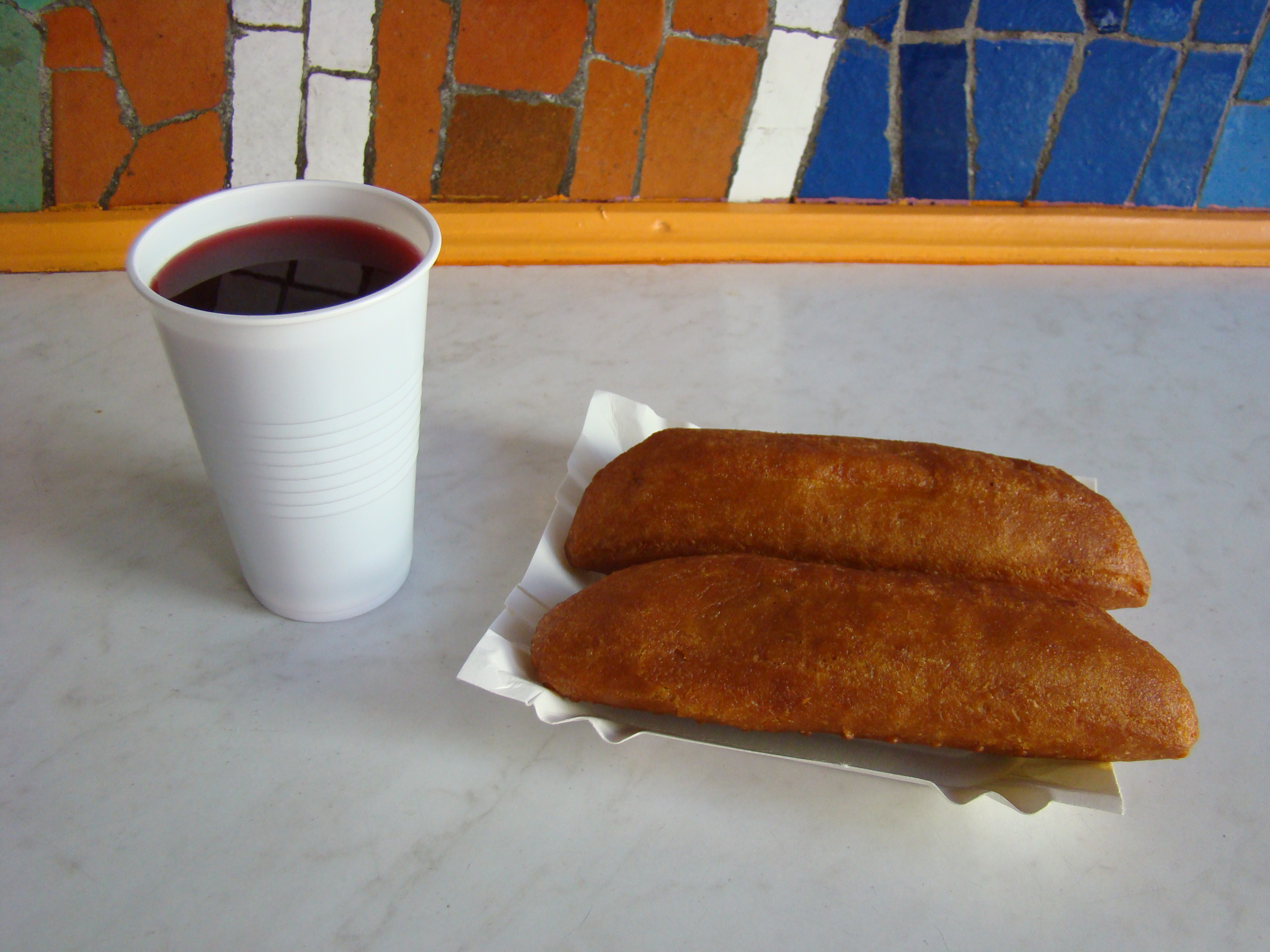
Pasztecik szczeciński on a small paper tray, with barszcz in a beaker, Poland

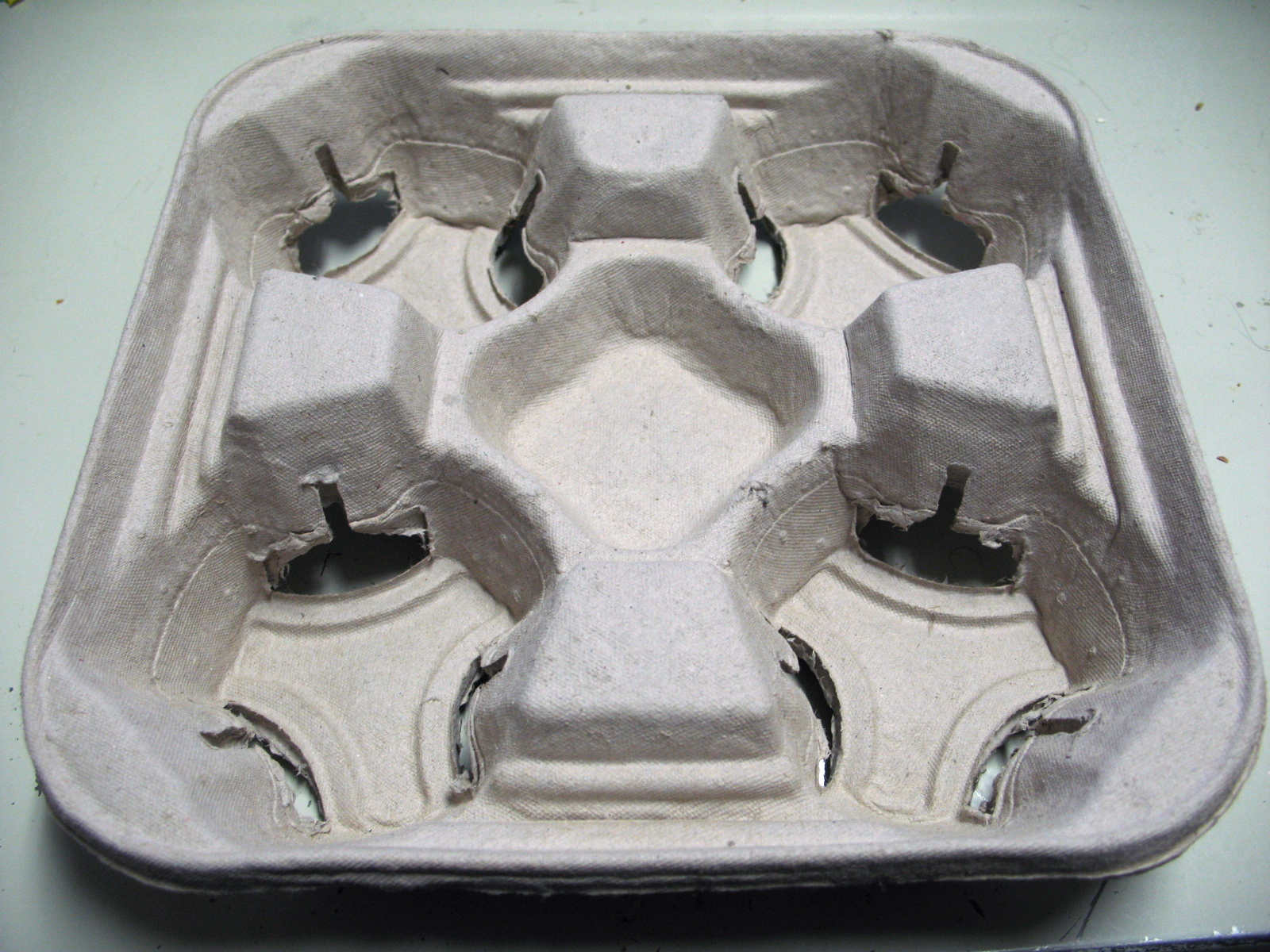
Molded pulp drink tray

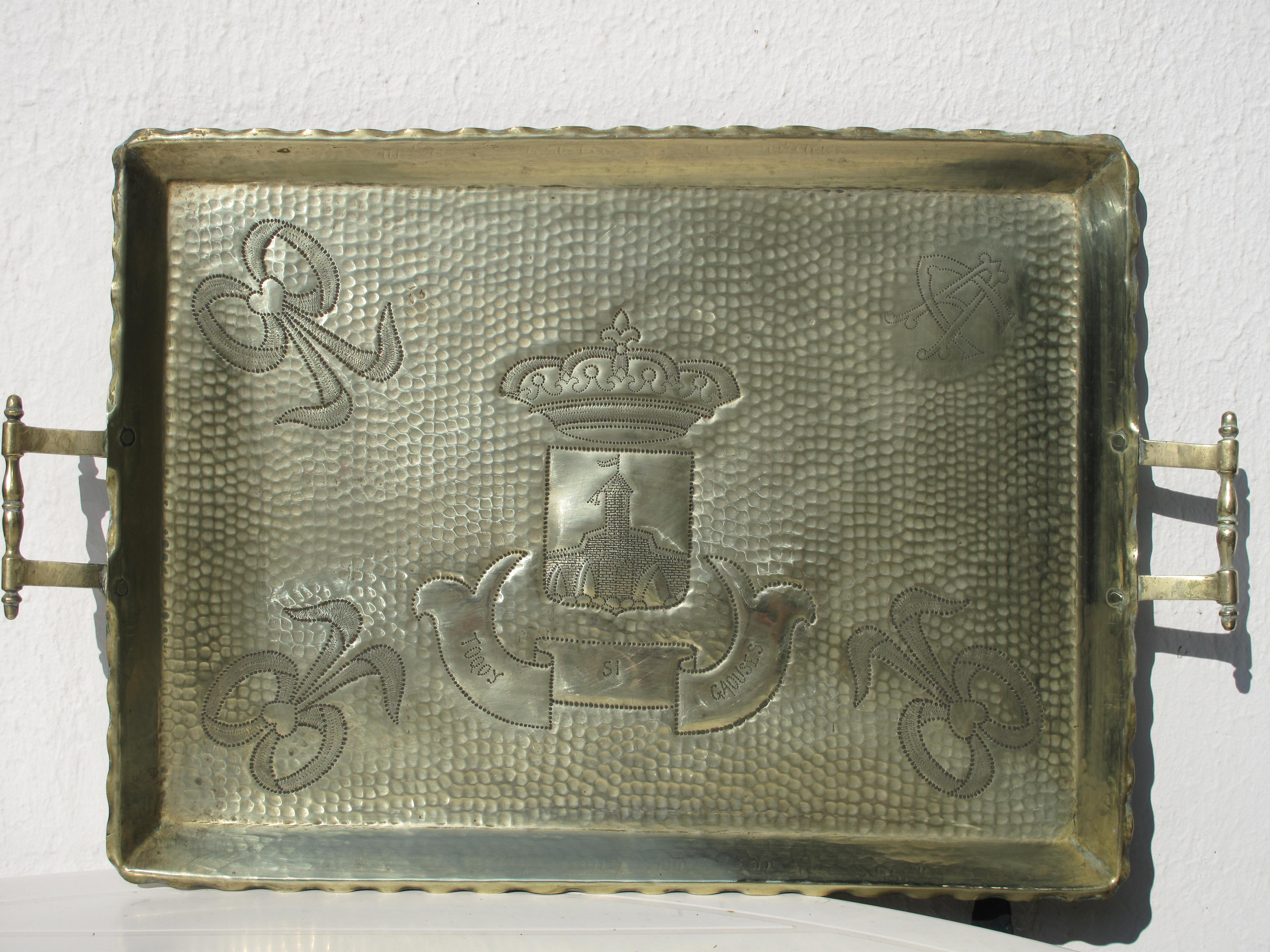
Brass plate circa 1920.

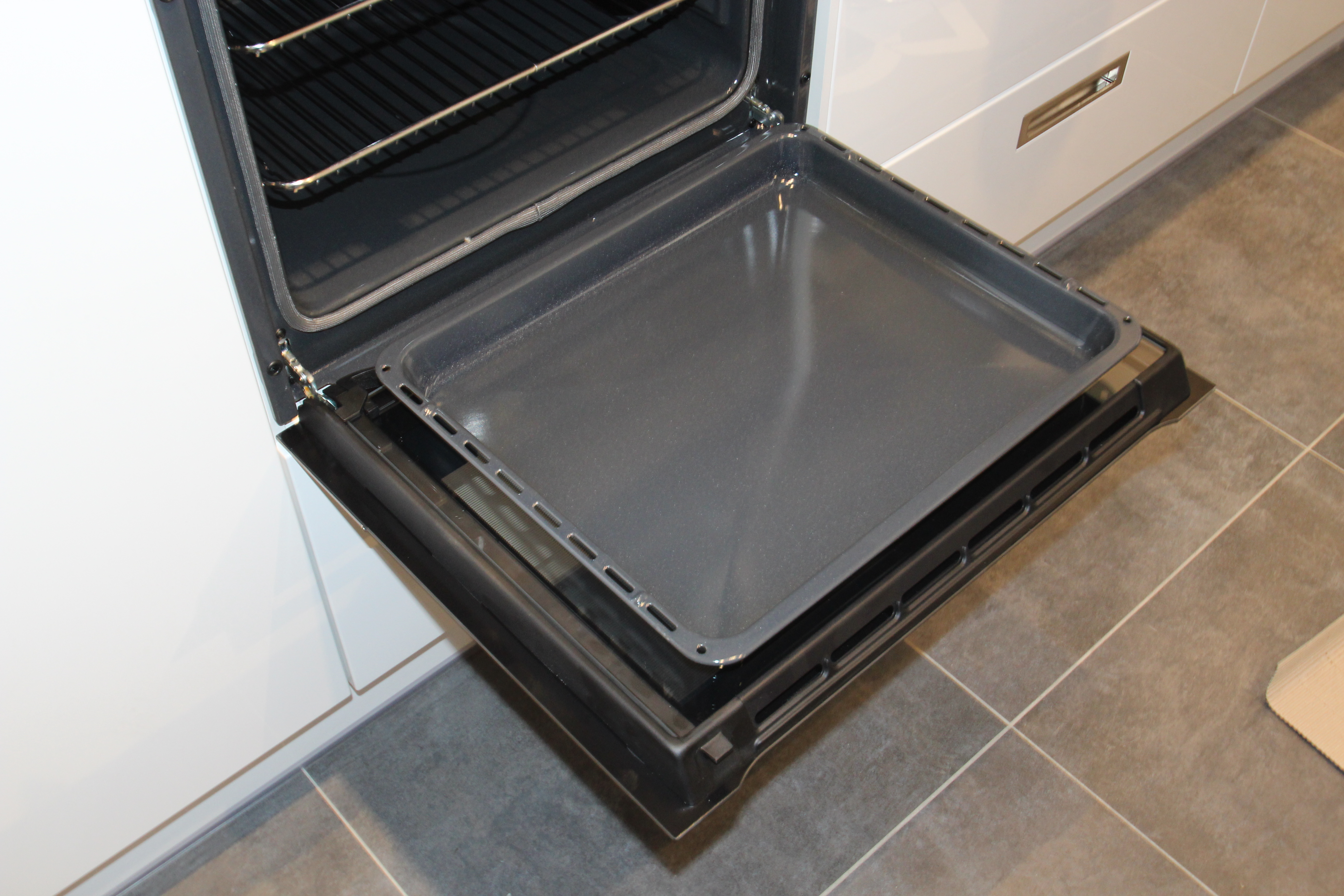
Sheet metal baking tray

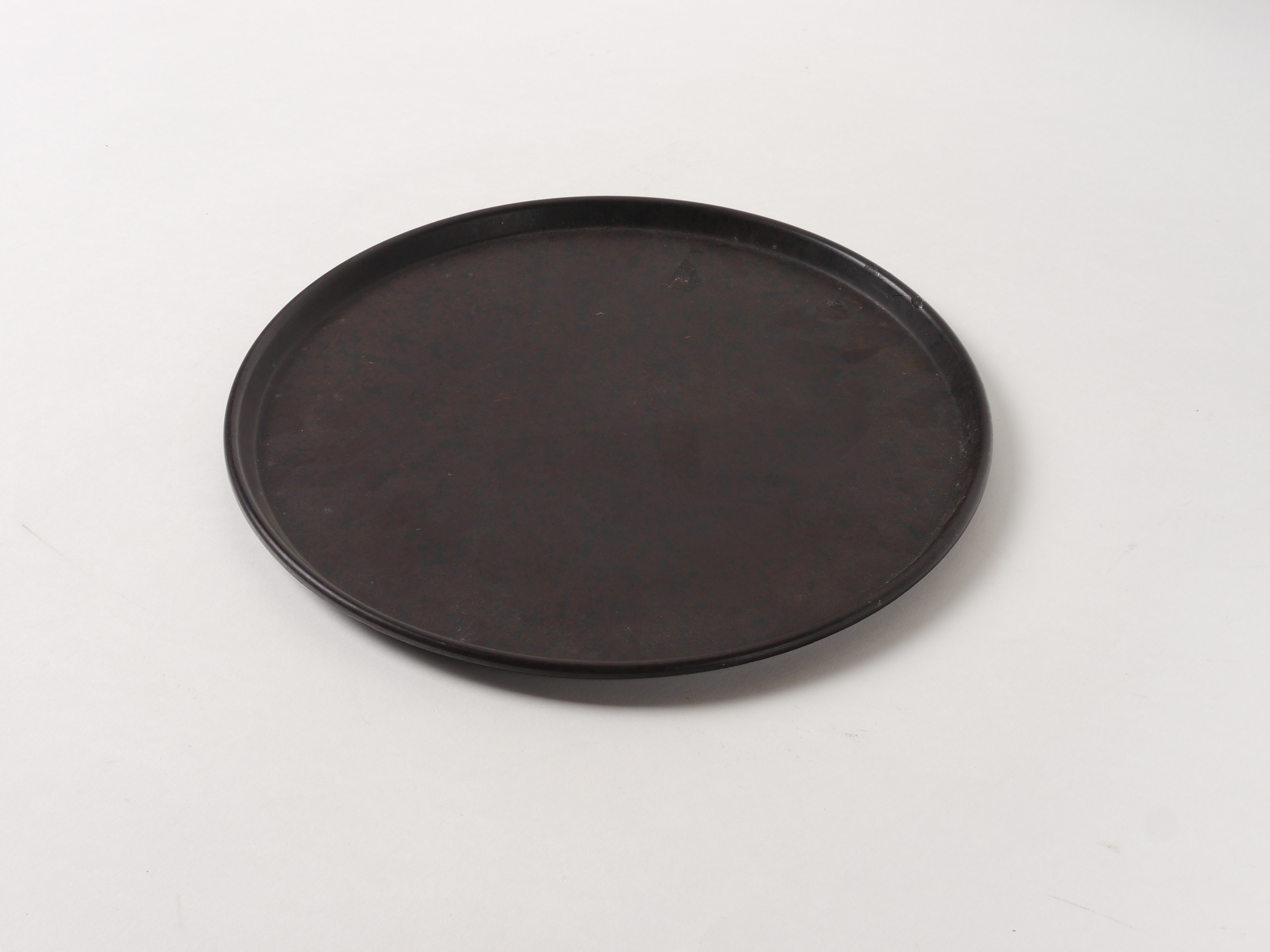
Round tray in bakelite, collection Museum of Industry Ghent.

== See also ==
- Germination
- Gastronorm, a European standard for food tray sizes
- Lazy Susan, a rotating tray, usually circular, placed on top of a table to aid in moving food on a large table or countertop.
- Phan (tray)
- Safetray
- Salver, a diminutive tray commonly used for lighter and smaller servings
- Serving cart
- Thali
- TV tray table
