= Arne Sorenson (hotel executive) =

American hotel executive (1958–2021)

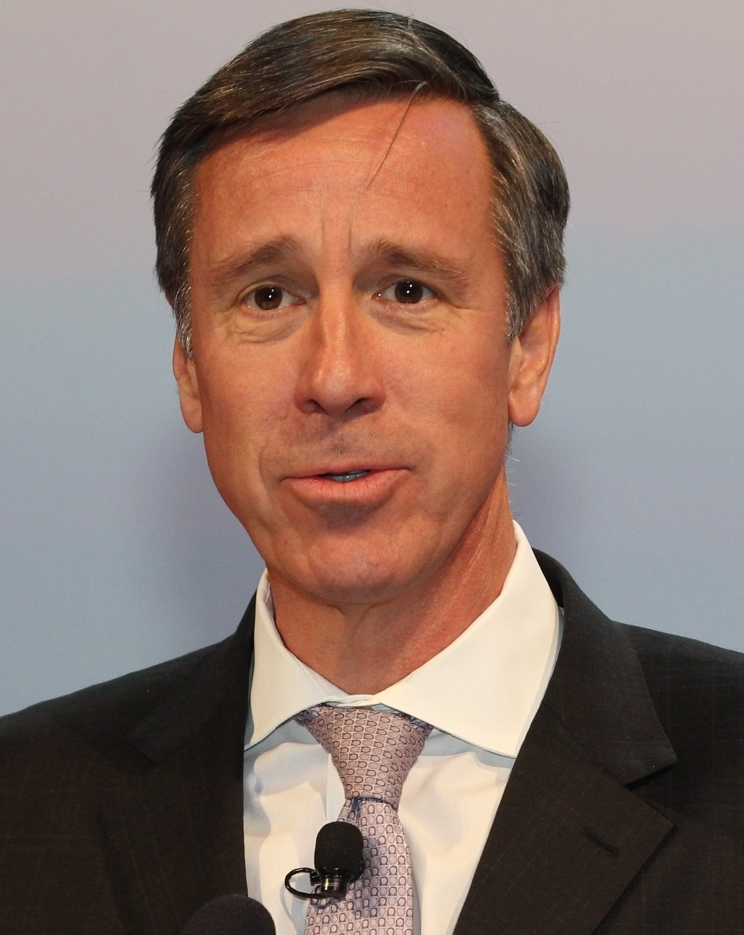
- Sorenson in 2016
- Born: Arne Morris Sorenson; October 13, 1958; Tokyo, Japan
- Died: February 15, 2021 (aged 62); Washington, D.C., U.S.
- Education: Luther College (BA); University of Minnesota (JD)
- Occupations: Business executive; attorney
- Political party: Democratic
- Spouse: Ruth Christenson (m. 1984)
- Children: 4

Arne Morris Sorenson (October 13, 1958 – February 15, 2021) was a Japanese-born American lawyer and hotel executive who served as the president and chief executive officer of Marriott International from 2012 until his death in 2021. He was a graduate of Luther College in Iowa, and the University of Minnesota Law School. He previously practiced law in Washington, D.C., with Latham and Watkins, specializing in mergers and acquisitions litigation. He joined Marriott in 1996 where he served in increasingly senior management roles before being promoted to chief executive.

He was also a member of the board of directors of Microsoft Corporation and Walmart, as well as a trustee of the Brookings Institution.

== Early life and education ==
Sorenson was born in Tokyo on October 13, 1958. His father, Morris "Bo" Sorenson Jr., was a Lutheran pastor in Japan at the time of his birth. His mother, Dorothy (Austin), was a public school teacher. The family returned to the United States when he was seven. He grew up in Saint Paul, Minnesota. He graduated from Luther College in Decorah, Iowa in 1980, with majors in business and religion, and proceeded to earn his JD from the University of Minnesota Law School in 1983.

== Career ==
Sorenson started his career working with the Washington, D.C.–based law firm Latham & Watkins, where he went on to become a partner, specializing in mergers and acquisitions. One of his clients during this time included Marriott International.

Sorenson joined Marriott International as an associate general counsel in 1996. He went on to become a senior vice president focusing on business development, as well as mergers and acquisitions. During this period, he handled the company's $1 billion acquisition of Renaissance Hotels. He later went on to become the chief financial officer, and then chief operating officer, before becoming the president and chief executive officer in 2012. Upon the retirement of Bill Marriott who remained as executive chairman, Sorenson became the third CEO in company history and the first executive outside of the Marriott family to lead the company.

As CEO of Marriott, one of the key decisions that Sorenson was known for was the $13 billion acquisition of Starwood Hotel & Resorts Worldwide, Inc., which made the company the largest global hotel chain with over 30 hospitality brands including Sheraton, W Hotels, Ritz-Carlton, Westin, among others, and held more than 1.4 million rooms globally. The acquisition had the company beat a bid from Hyatt hotels, and a bid from a Chinese insurance company, Anbang Insurance. The acquisition enabled the company to emerge as a dominant global player in the hospitality business with a presence in over 70 countries, and allowing for more favorable economics with providers including the likes of Expedia.

Some of the other moves introduced by Sorenson as the head of the company included diversifying the brand portfolio to cater to a younger audience, including teaming up with independent hotels that provided a distinct experience. He also had the company entering into the home-rental marketplace spurred by advances by new entrants like Airbnb. Some of the challenges faced during his time included a security breach in 2018 that had compromised more than personal records including passport numbers, credit card details, and other personal information of over 300 million guests. As a leader during the COVID-19 pandemic, he had initiated staff furloughs and retrenchments. He had notably mentioned in a video, that was released publicly, that he would not be taking his salary during the period.

Sorenson also served as a director of the boards of Microsoft Corporation and Walmart as well as a member of the Special Olympics board. He was also associated with the Brookings Institution as a trustee.

=== Political advocacy ===
Sorenson was a registered Democrat, but donated to Mitt Romney's 2012 election campaign. He had also advocated for LGBT rights and had opposed Indiana's proposed Religious Freedom Restoration Act. He was one of a number of CEOs who had asked for a full repeal of North Carolina's House Bill 2.

Sorenson spoke out against then-President Trump's Executive Order 13769, a ban on travel from seven majority-Muslim countries as potentially harmful to the U.S. tourism industry. He also advocated for improved relations with Cuba, including harnessing tourism as a strategic tool for this purpose.

== Personal life ==
Sorenson met his future wife, Ruth Christenson, when he was studying at Luther College and Christenson was working at her family's ice cream shop in Decorah, Iowa. The couple married in 1984 and went on to have four children.

During college, Sorenson's father sent him on a summer church mission in war-torn Beirut; he continued to be "driven by faith" throughout his life and career.

== Death and legacy ==
In 2019, it was announced that Sorenson was undergoing treatment for stage II pancreatic cancer at the Johns Hopkins Hospital. He continued to head the company during this period. On February 2, 2021, the company announced he would take a reduction in work hours to allow for treatment and spending time with his family. Although Sorenson had been described as in good health at that time, he unexpectedly died at his home in Washington, D.C., two weeks later on February 15, 2021, at age 62. Sorenson was succeeded as Marriott CEO by Anthony Capuano.

Considered an industry icon who was noted for a progressive, even "transformational" style of leadership, Sorenson's legacy inspired the creation of the Arne Sorenson Social Impact Leadership Award by the American Hotel and Lodging Association (AHLA), the American Hotel & Lodging Foundation, and the BHN Group in 2021.

== Awards ==
- International Leadership Award, 2019 by the World Trade Center Institute.
- "CEO of the Year," 2019 by Chief Executive magazine
- "CEO For All Leadership Award," 2020 by Great Place to Work.
- Awarded the "Out & Equal Ally Changemaker Award" for his advocacy for the LGBTQ community
- Katie Taylor Economic Empowerment Award for Women in Tourism and Hospitality
- Legend in Leadership Award, Yale Chief Executive Leadership Institute
- 2021 Above and Beyond Lifetime Achievement Award scheduled for posthumous presentation at The Lodging Conference, September 29, 2021.
