= Marriott International =

American multinational hospitality company

Marriott International, Inc.

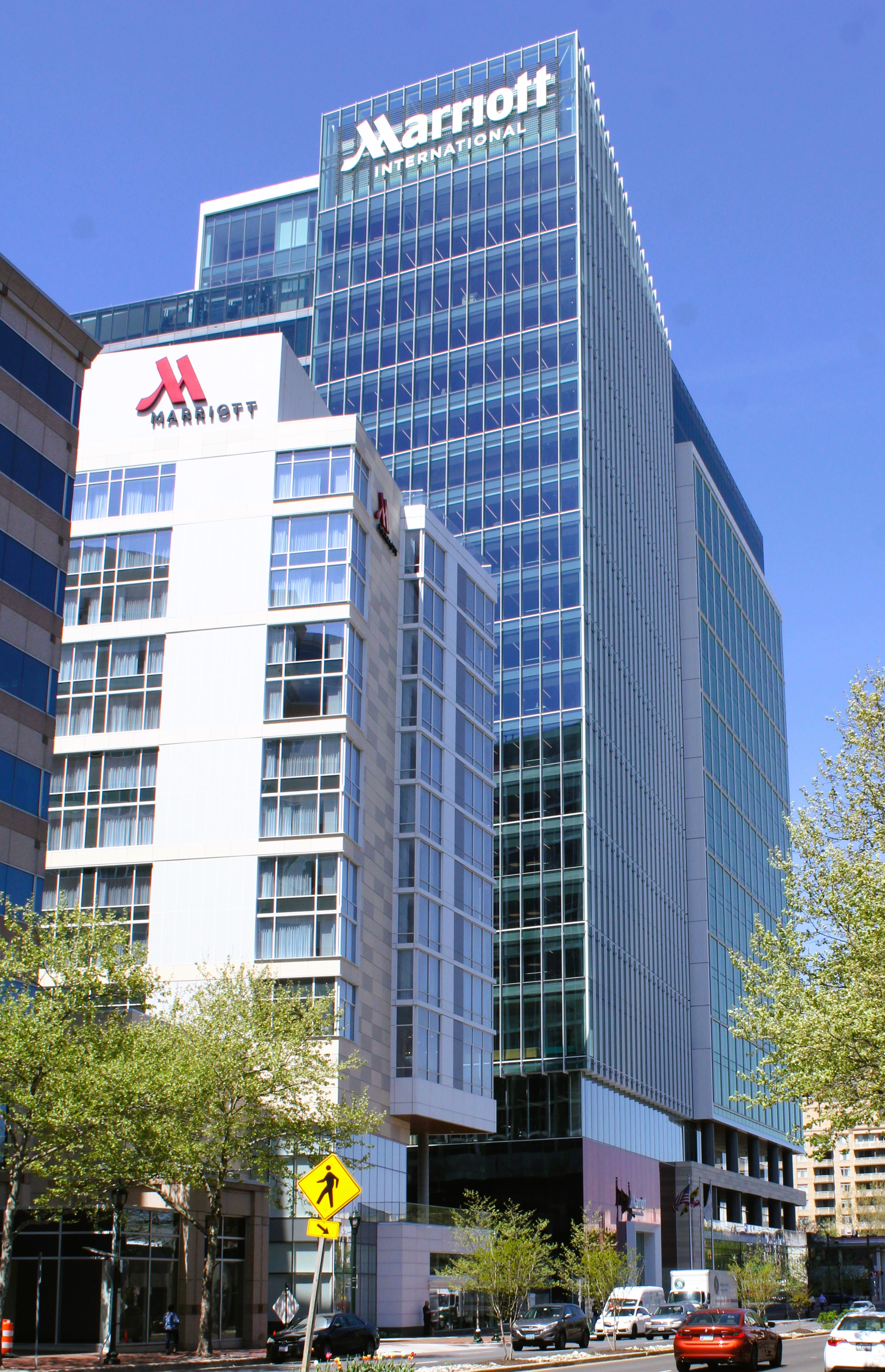
- Marriott International's headquarters in Bethesda, Maryland
- Type: Public
- Traded as: Nasdaq: MAR (Class A); Nasdaq-100 component; S&P 500 component
- Industry: Hospitality
- Predecessor: Marriott Corporation
- Incorporated: Delaware
- Founded: 1993; 33 years ago
- Founders: John Willard Marriott and Alice Marriott (1927)
- Headquarters: Bethesda, Maryland, U.S.
- Number of locations: 9,400+ (2025)
- Area served: Worldwide
- Key people: David Marriott (chairman); Anthony Capuano (CEO)
- Brands: See list
- Revenue: ▲US$26.2 billion (2025)
- Net income: ▲US$2.60 billion (2025)
- Number of employees: 418,000 (2024)
- Subsidiaries: Marriott Hotels & Resorts; Le Méridien; Ritz-Carlton Hotels; Sheraton Hotels; Westin Hotels & Resorts
- Website: marriott.com

Marriott International, Inc. (/ˈmær.i.ət/) is an American multinational company that operates, franchises, and licenses lodging brands that include hotel, residential, and timeshare properties. The company owns over 37 hotel and timeshare brands, with 9,000 locations and 1,597,380 rooms across its network (as of 2023). Headquartered in Bethesda, Maryland, the company is the successor to the hospitality division of the Marriott Corporation, which was founded by J. Willard Marriott (1900–1985) and his wife Alice Marriott (1907–2000).

== Profile ==
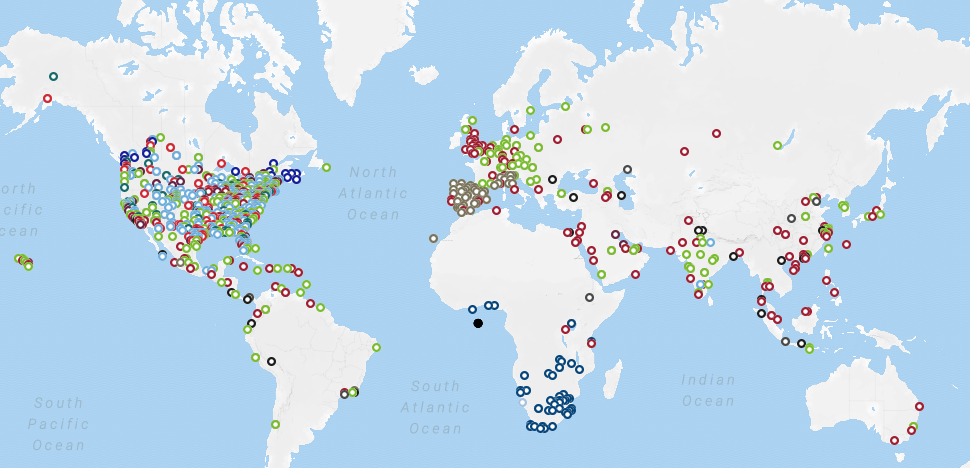
Marriott International hotels worldwide

Marriott International is the largest hotel company in the world by the number of available rooms. It has 41 brands with 9,361 properties containing 1,706,331 rooms in 144 countries and territories according to 2025 financial documents. Of these 9,361 properties, 1,981 are managed but not owned by Marriott, 7,192 are owned and managed by independent hospitality companies under franchise agreements with Marriott, and 51 are both owned and managed by Marriott. The company also operates 20 hotel reservation centers.

Marriott International, Inc. was formed in 1993 when Marriott Corporation split into two companies: Marriott International, Inc., which franchises and manages properties, and Host Marriott Corporation (now Host Hotels & Resorts), which owns properties.

== History ==
=== Founding and early years ===
The Marriott Corporation traces its origins to 1927, when John Willard Marriott, his wife Alice, and a business partner operated a root beer stand in Washington, DC. After serving a mission for the Church of Jesus Christ of Latter-day Saints in New England, Marriott had traveled to Washington, DC, where he experienced the humid summer weather of the city. After returning to Utah and graduating from the University of Utah, Marriott purchased the rights to franchise an A&W Root Beer stand in Columbia Heights. Permission was subsequently received from A&W to start selling food. The stand was renamed The Hot Shoppe, and it grew in popularity. Always looking for new ways to improve his business, Marriott bought a vacant lot next to one of his Hot Shoppes, removed the curb, and began offering the first drive-in service on the East Coast. This move popularized the restaurants, and by 1932, the Marriotts owned seven Hot Shoppes in the DC area. In 1953, Hot Shoppes, Inc. became a public company via an initial public offering.

On January 16, 1957, the company opened its first hotel, the Marriott Motor Hotel, in Arlington, Virginia. It cost $9 per night, plus an extra $1 for every person that was in the car. The company's second hotel, the Marriott Key Bridge Motor Hotel in Rosslyn, Arlington, Virginia, opened in 1959 and was the company's longest continuously operating hotel until its closure in July 2021.

Hot Shoppes, Inc. was renamed the Marriott Corporation in 1967.

In 1972, the Marriott lodging division acquired the Greek-based Sun Line cruise line, which it owned until 1987.

In 1976, the company opened two theme parks, each named Marriott's Great America, in California and Illinois. Marriott sold the parks in 1984, with the California park bought by the City of Santa Clara and the Illinois park bought by Bally Manufacturing, then the parent company of the Six Flags Corporation (both are now owned by Six Flags).

Marriott has faced criticism over its animal welfare policies, particularly for using eggs from caged hens in global operations and failing to meet deadlines to transition to cage-free eggs.

=== Marriott International ===
Marriott International, Inc. was formed in 1993 when Marriott Corporation split into two companies: Marriott International, Inc., which franchises and manages properties, and Host Marriott Corporation (now Host Hotels & Resorts), which owns properties.

In 1995, Marriott was the first hotel company to offer online reservations.

In April 1995, Marriott acquired a 49% interest in the Ritz-Carlton Hotel Company. Marriott believed that it could increase sales and profit margins for the Ritz-Carlton, a troubled chain with many properties either losing money or barely breaking even. The cost to Marriott was estimated to have been about $200 million in cash and assumed debt. The next year, Marriott spent $331 million to acquire the Ritz-Carlton, Atlanta, and buy a majority interest in two properties owned by William Johnson, a real estate developer who had purchased the Ritz-Carlton, Boston, in 1983 and expanded his Ritz-Carlton holdings over the next 20 years. Ritz-Carlton expanded into the timeshare market; it benefited from Marriott's reservation system and buying power. In 1998, Marriott acquired majority ownership of the Ritz-Carlton.

In 1997, the company acquired the Renaissance Hotels and Ramada brands from Chow Tai Fook Group and its associate company, New World Development. Marriott International also signed an agreement to manage hotels owned by New World Development. The same year the company also got into the home-cleaning business by starting a new venture dubbed HomeSolutions.

In 2001, the Marriott World Trade Center was destroyed during the September 11 attacks.

In 2002, CTF Hotel Holdings Inc., a company that owns a hotel in Hong Kong managed by Marriott, sued Marriott alleging that Marriott engaged in extortion and bribery. According to the allegations, Marriott contracted to receive audio-visual services from Molloy. Marriott paid an inflated amount to Molloy and pocketed the $1.7 million above its fee. Marriott had to return the money to CTF Hotel. CTF Hotel also accused Marriott of accepting bribes from suppliers.

In 2003, the company completed the corporate spin-off of its senior-living properties (now part of Sunrise Senior Living) and Marriott Distribution Services. In the same year, the owners of the Marriott-operated, Town Hotels, sued Marriott for breach of contract, breach of fiduciary duty, negligence, and fraud. They claimed that Marriott along with the Avendra hotel chain violated West Virginia law by contracting with vendors and receiving "sponsorship fees" from them to provide services to Town Hotels, when according to the contract, Marriott was forbidden to profit from the contract except for management fees.

In 2004, the company sold its right to the Ramada brand, acquired in 1997, to Cendant.

In 2005, Marriott International and Marriott Vacation Club International were two of the 53 entities that contributed the maximum of $250,000 to the Second inauguration of George W. Bush.

On July 19, 2006, Marriott implemented a smoking ban in all buildings it operated in the United States and Canada, effective September of that year.

In 2007, Marriott became the first hotel chain to serve food that is completely free of trans fats at all of its North American properties.

Hotels franchised or operated by the company were affected by the 2003 Marriott Hotel bombing, the Islamabad Marriott Hotel bombing in 2008, and the 2009 Jakarta bombings.

On November 11, 2010, Marriott announced plans to add over 600 hotel properties by 2015, primarily in emerging markets: India, where it planned to have 100 hotel properties, China, and Southeast Asia.

On January 21, 2011, Marriott said that adult movies would not be included in the entertainment offered at new hotels, which would use an Internet-based video-on-demand system.

In 2011, Mitt Romney received $260,390 in director's fees from Marriott International, despite the fact that he had already stepped down from the board of directors to run for President of the United States. His released 2010 tax returns showed earnings in 2010 of $113,881 in director's fees from Marriott. In February 2012, Bloomberg News reported on Romney's years overseeing tax matters for Marriott, which had included several "scams" (quoting John McCain) and legal actions brought against Marriott, which Marriott lost in court, over its manipulations of the U.S. Tax Code.

Effective March 31, 2012, Bill Marriott assumed the role of executive chairman of the company and relinquished the role of chief executive officer to Arne Sorenson.

In December 2012, Guinness World Records recognized the JW Marriott Marquis Dubai, a five-star hotel, as the tallest hotel in the world.

In 2013, the owners of the Madison 92nd Street Associates LLC, who contracted with Marriott to manage their hotel, sued Marriott for $400 million, alleging that Marriott had conspired with the workers' committee. They claimed that Marriott allowed the workers to unionize at the Madison-owned hotel in exchange for not unionizing at Marriott's flagship hotels.

On October 3, 2014, the Federal Communications Commission (FCC) fined Marriott $600,000 for unlawful use of a "containment" feature of a Wi-Fi monitoring system to deliberately interfere with client-owned networks in the convention space of its Gaylord Opryland Resort & Convention Center in Nashville. The scheme disrupted operation of clients' mobile phone hotspots via Wi-Fi deauthentication attacks. Marriott International, Inc., the American Hotel and Lodging Association and Ryman Hospitality Properties responded by unsuccessfully petitioning the FCC to change the rules to allow them to continue jamming client-owned networks, a position which they were forced to abandon in early 2015 in response to backlash from clients, mainstream media, major technology companies, and mobile carriers. The incident drew unfavorable publicity to Marriott's practice of charging exorbitant fees for Wi-Fi.

On April 1, 2015, Marriott acquired Canadian hotel chain Delta Hotels, which operated 38 hotels at that time.

On November 16, 2015, Marriott announced the acquisition of Starwood for $13 billion. A higher offer for Starwood at $14 billion from a consortium led by China's Anbang Insurance Group was announced March 3, 2016. After Marriott raised its bid to $13.6 billion on March 21, Starwood terminated the Anbang agreement and proceeded with the merger with Marriott. Following receipt of regulatory approvals, Marriott closed the merger with Starwood on September 23, 2016, creating the world's largest hotel company with over 5700 properties, 1.1 million rooms, and a portfolio of 30 brands. The Starwood acquisition gave Marriott a larger non-US presence; approximately 75% of Starwood's revenues were from non-US markets.

On November 30, 2018, Marriott disclosed that the former Starwood brands had been subject to a data breach. After the disclosure, Attorney General of New York Barbara Underwood announced an investigation into the data breach. The cyberattack was found to be a part of a Chinese intelligence-gathering effort that also hacked health insurers and the security clearance files of millions more Americans. The hackers are suspected of working on behalf of the Ministry of State Security, the country's Communist-controlled civilian spy agency. Initially, Marriott said that 500 million customers' personal information had been exposed. In January 2019, the company updated the number of guests affected to "less than 383 million" customers, and claimed many of the customer's payment cards had expired. The UK Information Commissioner's Office fined Marriott £18 million for breaches to GDPR law that contributed to the breach. Australia's Information Commissioner served Marriott an 'enforceable undertaking' to improve their security.

In 2019 and 2021, Marriott faced an investigation and a class action lawsuit in the US for its practice of charging resort fees that were not included in the room price, with the services included in these "resort fees" unclear. This method is prohibited in many parts of the world and is known as "drip pricing".

In December 2019, the company acquired Elegant Hotels, operator of seven hotels in Barbados.

In February 2020, the company discovered a data breach that included the theft of contact information for 5.2 million customers.

IIn 2020, the Mandalay Bay (including the Delano tower) was sold in a lease-back deal to Blackstone and MGM Growth Properties. VICI Properties acquired them at a later date through corporate buyouts from 2022 to 2023.

In April 2020, during the COVID-19 pandemic, the company instituted additional cleanliness standards, including requiring the use of electrostatic sprayers with disinfectant, adding disinfecting wipes in all hotel rooms, and removing or rearranging furniture in public areas to allow more space for social distancing. During the pandemic, global occupancy fell as low as 31%.

President and CEO Arne Sorenson died on February 15, 2021, from pancreatic cancer. On February 23, 2021, Anthony Capuano was appointed to fill Sorensen's vacancy as CEO and director, having previously served as Marriott's group president of global development, design, and operations.

In November 2021, the company was criticized for refusing to host the World Uyghur Congress at one of its properties in Prague, citing reasons of "political neutrality".

In August 2022, employees began moving into the company's new 21-story, 785,000-square-foot headquarters building on Wisconsin Avenue, ahead of an official opening on September 21. The new building was constructed over four years as part of a $600 million downtown Bethesda campus, together with the adjacent Marriott Bethesda Downtown hotel.

In 2023, a criminal investigation was opened against Marriott in Poland, claiming that it acted fraudulently and unethically against the Lim Company, the owner of a Warsaw hotel. During the COVID-19 period, Marriott would not keep up the hotel's maintenance and shifted the costs of maintaining the empty hotel to the Lim Company. At the same time, Marriott prevented the Lim Company from renting the hotel to the National Health Fund for doctors' housing or contracting for advertising deals until the Lim Company would pay unwarranted bonuses to Marriott.

Also in the same year, on May 1, Marriott announced that it completed the acquisition of Mexican hotelier Hoteles City Express. By this move, Marriott officially entered the affordable midscale-segment under City Express by Marriott brands. The company also launched another brand focusing on budget extended stays called StudioRes in August, and an extension to its Four Points by Sheraton brand called Four Points Express (later called Four Points Flex) in September.

In August 2024, Marriott announced a long-term licensing agreement with Sonder, adding 10,500 rooms to their portfolio and allowing customers to earn or redeem Marriott Bonvoy points at Sonder properties starting in late 2024.

In December 2024, one of Marriott's luxury hotel chains, W Hotels introduced W Las Vegas, replacing the Delano Las Vegas.

In April 2025, the company acquired Citizen M, a Dutch-based hotel brand, for $355 million. The deal is expected to be completed by the end of the year and is subject to regulatory approval. That same year in May, Series by Marriott was launched through a founding deal with Concept Hospitality Private Limited.

In December 2024, Marriott announced plans to expand into outdoor-focused lodging through the acquisition of Postcard Cabins and a long-term partnership agreement with Trailborn. The Postcard Cabins portfolio, consisting of 29 properties and more than 1,200 units across the United States, was incorporated into Marriott’s offerings through the deal. Trailborn, which operated five lodges totaling 559 rooms near major outdoor recreation areas, also joined under a separate long-term agreement. Together, the arrangements were presented as what Marriott described as its planned Outdoor Collection platform. The Outdoor Collection was formally launched in late September 2025.

In June 2026, Marriott made a joint venture with the Leali family to intergate Lefay, a luxury resort brand based in Southern Italy, into Marriott Bonvoy, with full integration expected to be completed in late 2026. It is also Marriott's very first luxury wellness brand.

== Corporate affairs ==
=== Senior leadership ===
From Marriott's founding in 1927 to 2012, the company's senior leadership was led by members of the Marriott family. In 2012, Arne Sorenson became the first non-Marriott family member to be appointed chief executive; this practice continued when Anthony Capuano was named his successor in 2021. The current practice is members of the Marriott family are named chairman while other company executives are named as chief executive.

Chairmen

1. J. Willard Marriott (1927–1985)
2. Bill Marriott (1985–2022)
3. David Marriott (since May 2022)

Chief executives

1. J. Willard Marriott (1927–1972)
2. Bill Marriott (1972–2012)
3. Arne Sorenson (2012–2021)
4. Anthony Capuano (since February 2021)

=== Business figures ===
Sales by region (2023)
Region	Sales in billion $	share
United States and Canada	17.7	74.6%
International	4.5	18.8%
Unallocated corporate and other	1.6	6.6%

Year	Revenue	Net income	Total assets	Employees
Year	Millions of US$			Employees
2005	11,129	669	8,530	143,000
2006	11,995	608	8,588	150,600
2007	12,990	696	8,942	151,000
2008	12,879	362	8,903	146,000
2009	10,908	−346	7,933	137,000
2010	11,691	458	8,983	129,000
2011	12,317	198	5,910	120,000
2012	11,814	571	6,342	127,000
2013	12,784	626	6,794	123,000
2014	13,796	753	6,833	123,500
2015	14,486	859	6,082	127,500
2016	15,407	808	24,140	226,500
2017	20,452	1,459	23,948	177,000
2018	20,758	1,907	23,696	176,000
2019	20,972	1,273	25,051	174,000
2020	10,571	−267	24,701	121,000
2021	13,857	1,099	25,553	120,000
2022	20,773	2,358	25,184	377,000
2023	23,713	3,083	25,712	411,000
2024	25,100	2,375	26,182	418,000

=== Environment ===
Marriott International reported total CO_{2} emissions (direct + indirect) for the 12 months ending 31 December 2020, at 5,166 Kt (-1,643 /-24.1% y-o-y) and aims to reach net zero emissions by 2050.

Marriott International's annual total CO_{2} emissions - market-based Scope 1 + Scope 2 (in kilotonnes)
Dec 2017	Dec 2018	Dec 2019	Dec 2020
6,238	6,836	6,809	5,166

=== Loyalty program – Marriott Bonvoy ===
Marriott Bonvoy is Marriott's current loyalty program, formed in the February 2019 merger of its three former rewards programs: Marriott Rewards, Ritz-Carlton Rewards, and Starwood Preferred Guest. Starwood Preferred Guest (also known as SPG) was founded in 1999 as the first in the industry to enforce a policy of no blackout dates, no capacity controls, and online redemption. In 2012, Starwood Preferred Guest began offering lifetime status and a dedicated Starwood ambassador for loyal members. Ritz-Carlton Rewards was founded in 2010. Members were able to receive air miles instead of reward points and able to earn 10 points (or two miles) for every dollar spent on any Ritz-Carlton room rates. Despite the restriction of membership to only one of the two programs, members of Ritz-Carlton Rewards were able to earn points in other Marriott hotels, while Marriott Rewards members were able to earn points at a Ritz-Carlton.

As of March 2026, Marriott Bonvoy has five tiers in addition to the base tier of simply being a "member"; the following tiers and some benefits include:

	Silver Elite	Gold Elite	Platinum Elite	Titanium Elite	Ambassador Elite
Annual membership requirements	Must stay at least 10 nights at a Marriott property participating in the Bonvoy program (almost all Marriott properties participate in Bonvoy)	Must stay at least 25 nights at Marriott properties	Must stay at least 50 nights at Marriott properties	Must stay at least 75 nights at Marriott properties	Must stay at least 100 nights at Marriott properties and spend at least $23,000.00 per year at or on Marriott properties
Bonus Points	10% Bonus points earned on money spent for stays at Marriott properties	25% Bonus points earned on money spent for stays at Marriott properties	50% Bonus points earned on money spent for stays at Marriott properties	75% Bonus points earned on money spent for stays at Marriott properties	75% Bonus points earned on money spent for stays at Marriott properties
Late checkout	Priority late checkout	2 pm	4 pm	4 pm	4 pm
Guaranteed welcome gift		Points	Points, breakfast offering, or amenity	Points, breakfast offering, or amenity	Points, breakfast offering, or amenity
Enhanced room upgrade		✓	✓	✓	✓
Dedicated elite support			✓	✓	✓
Guaranteed lounge access			✓	✓	✓
Annual choice benefit			Stay 50 qualifying nights	Stay 75 qualifying nights	
48-hour guarantee				✓	✓
Your24					✓
Ambassador service					✓

However, Bulgari Hotels & Resorts does not participate in Marriott Bonvoy, so guests cannot redeem points. It is currently the only brand to do so, following the inclusion of Ritz-Carlton Reserve properties in 2022.

=== Awards ===
- In November 2020, Marriott International was named as one of the "Top 75 Companies for Executive Women" by Working Mother.
- In June 2022, Marriott was recognized by the International Hospitality Institute on the Global 100 in Hospitality, a list featuring the 100 Most Powerful People in Global Hospitality.

== Marriott brands ==
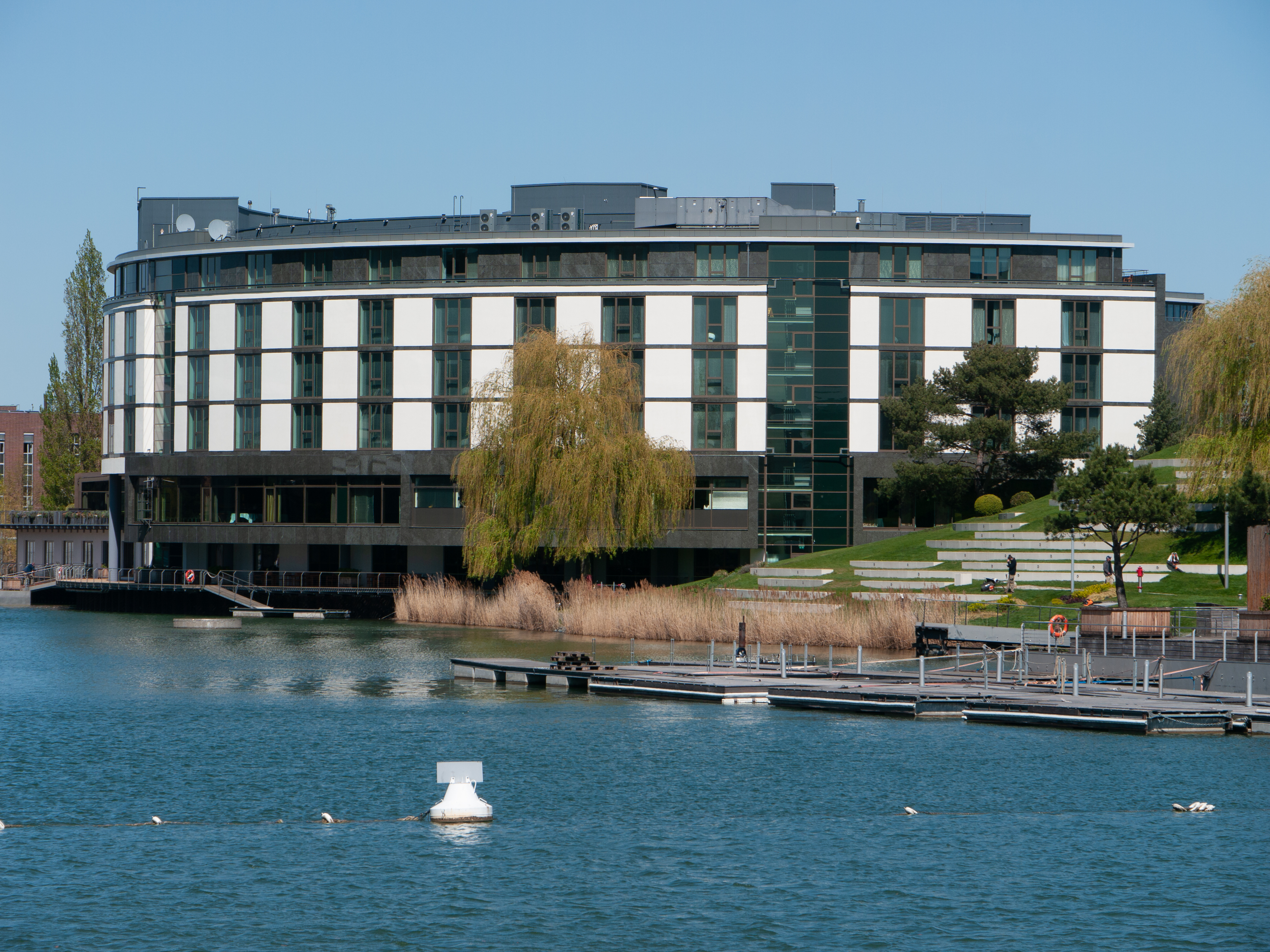
The Ritz-Carlton in Wolfsburg

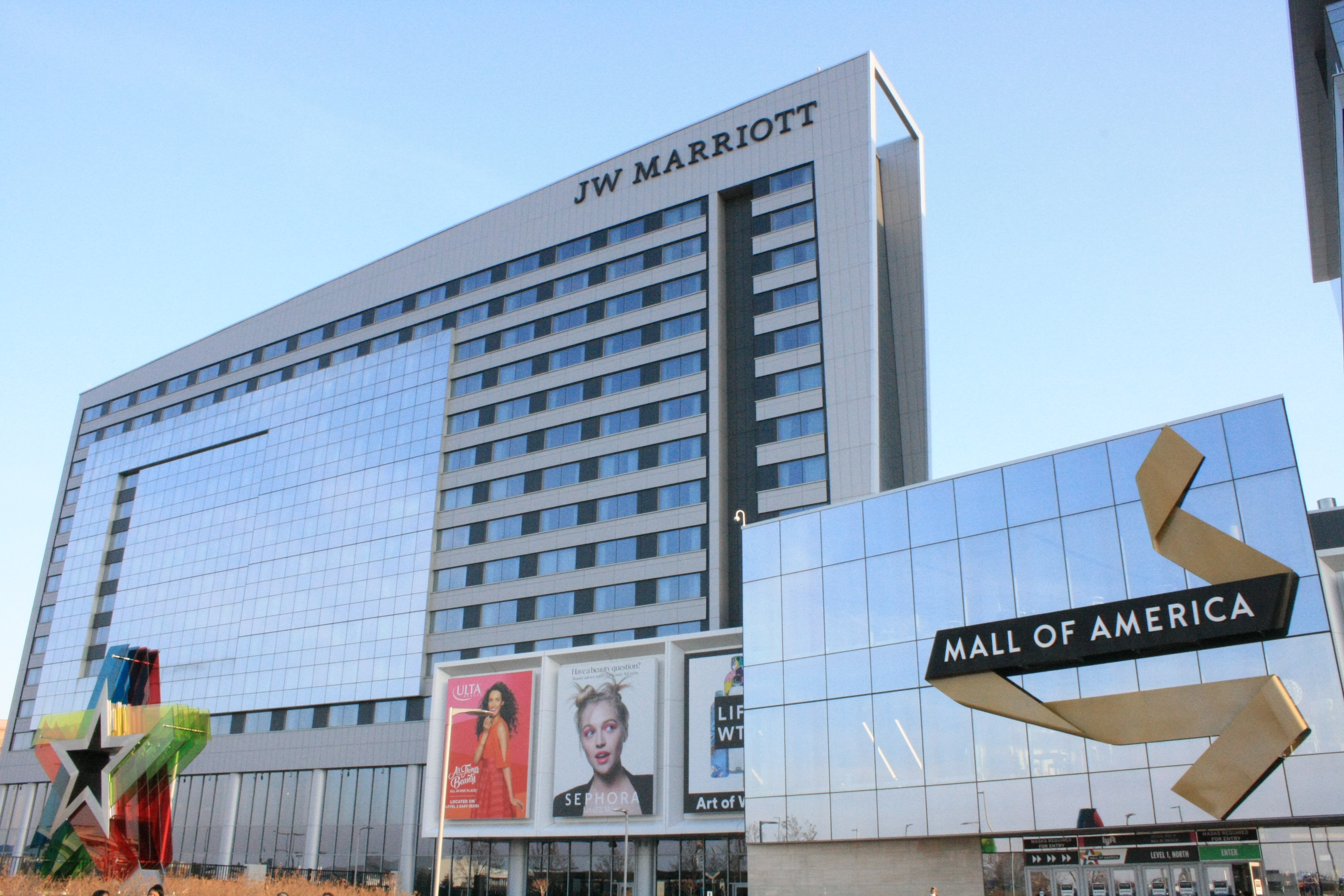
JW Marriott at the Mall of America

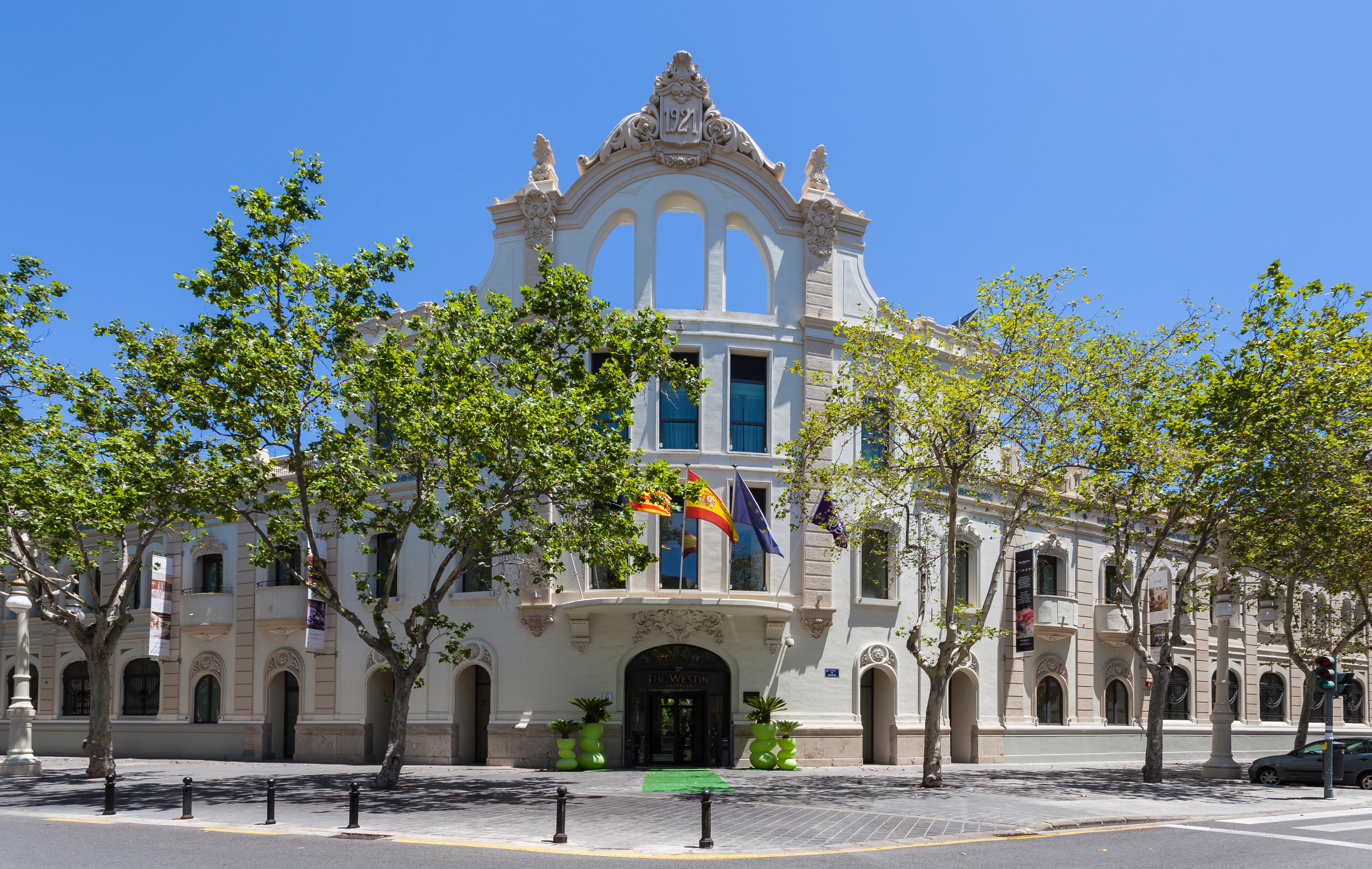
Westin in Valencia

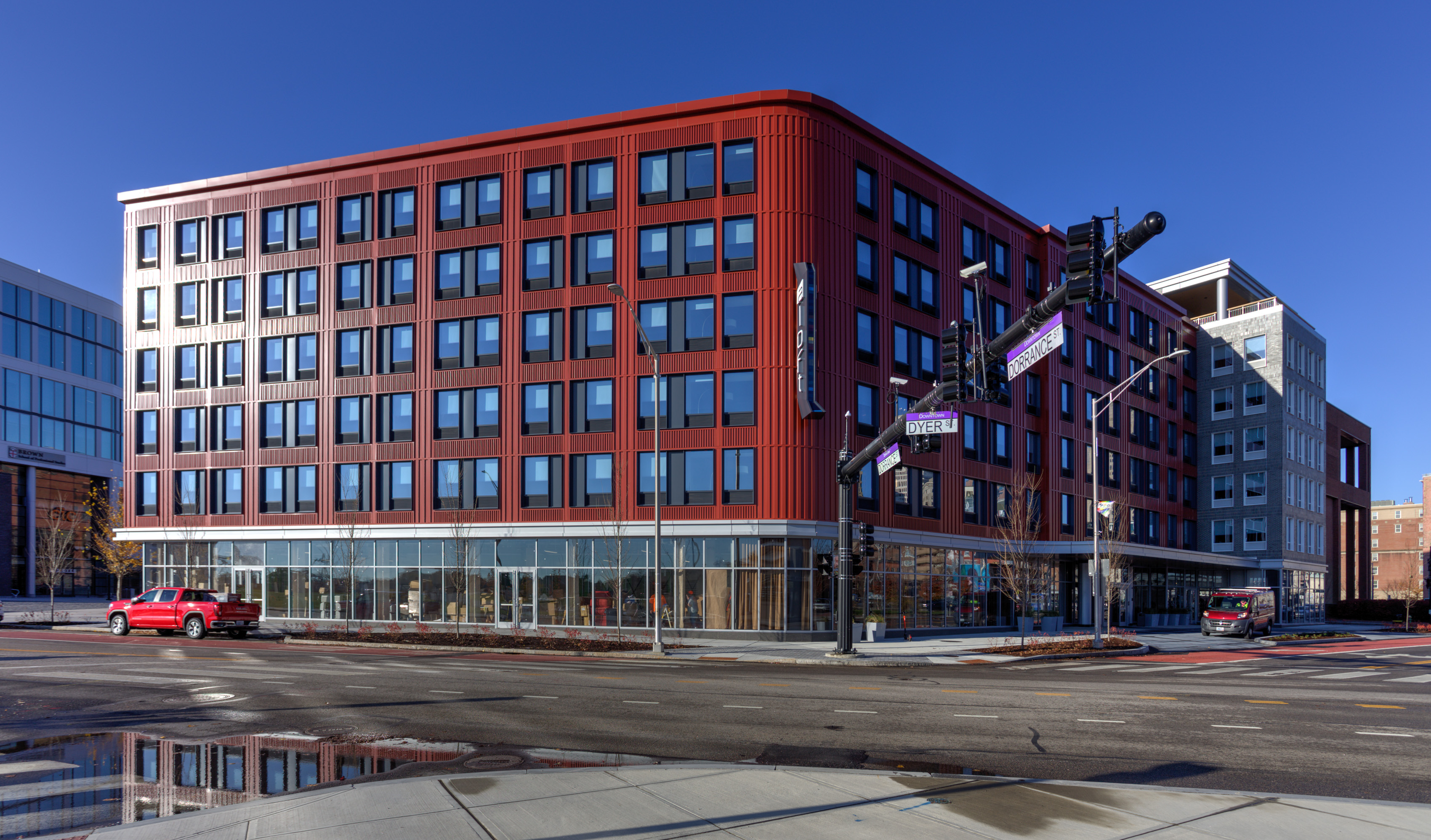
Aloft Hotel in Providence

=== Overview ===
As of 2026, Marriott International operates hotels, resorts, and other properties under these brands internationally:

==== Luxury ====
- Bulgari Hotels & Resorts
- EDITION Hotels
- Lefay Resorts & Residences (full integration expected in late 2026)
- JW Marriott Hotels
- St. Regis Hotels & Resorts
- The Luxury Collection
- The Ritz-Carlton
- The Ritz-Carlton Reserve
- W Hotels

==== Premium ====
- Autograph Collection Hotels
- Delta Hotels
- Design Hotels
- Gaylord Hotels
- Le Méridien
- Marriott Hotels & Resorts
- MGM Collection
- Outdoor Collection by Marriott Bonvoy
- Renaissance Hotels
- Sheraton Hotels and Resorts
- The Marriott Vacation Clubs
- Tribute Portfolio
- Westin Hotels & Resorts

==== Select ====
- AC Hotels
- Aloft Hotels
- citizenM
- City Express by Marriott
- Courtyard by Marriott
- Fairfield by Marriott
- Four Points by Sheraton
- Four Points Flex by Sheraton (formerly branded Four Points Express)
- Moxy Hotels
- Protea Hotels by Marriott
- Series by Marriott
- SpringHill Suites

==== Longer stays ====
- Apartments by Marriott Bonvoy
- Element Hotels
- Homes & Villas by Marriott Bonvoy
- Marriott Executive Apartments
- Residence Inn by Marriott
- StudioRes
- TownePlace Suites

== The Luxury Collection ==
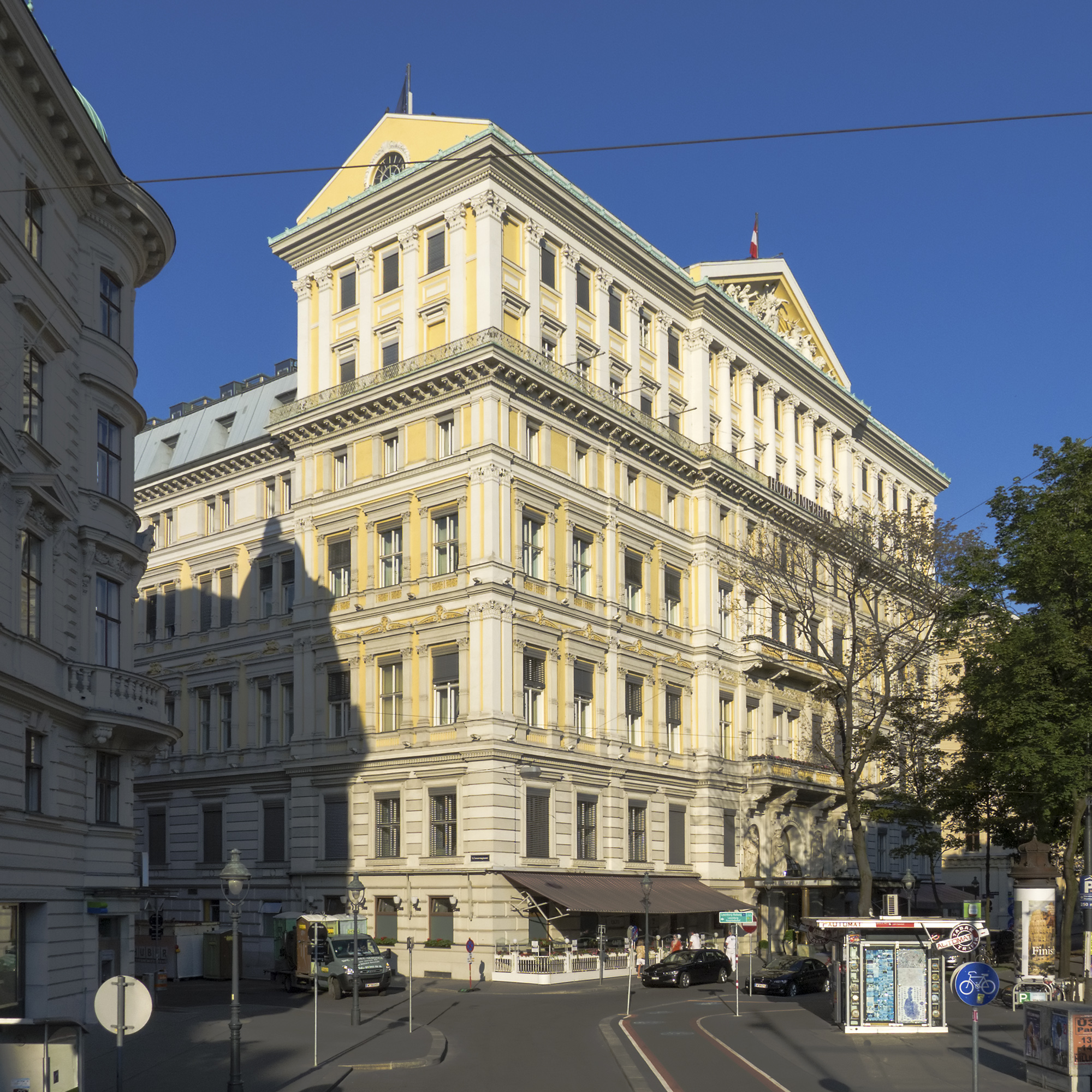
Hotel Imperial, a Luxury Collection hotel in Vienna, Austria

The Luxury Collection is a brand of Marriott International for luxury properties. It is notable as the first "soft brand" hotel chain. Most hotels of the brand are located in converted historic buildings, including palaces or older hotels. The brand also enlists notable designers to craft luxury travel accessories that are available exclusively on the brand's website.

=== History ===
The Luxury Collection brand began on January 13, 1992, when ITT Sheraton designated 28 of its most expensive hotels and 33 of the Sheraton Towers, as the ITT Sheraton Luxury Collection.

In February 1994, ITT Sheraton Hotels and Resorts acquired a controlling interest in Compagnia Italiana Grandi Alberghi (CIGA or Italian Grand Hotels Company), an Italian international hotel chain that owned several luxury properties in Europe. The majority of the CIGA hotels were folded into The Luxury Collection. CIGA's original logo, the four horses of St. Mark, was kept for The Luxury Collection brand logo until 2010; each Luxury Collection hotel now uses its own logo.

In 2011, it embarked on an advertising campaign. In 2012, the brand announced a major expansion in Asia, particularly in China. Also in 2014, the brand signed Danish supermodel Helena Christensen as spokesperson. In 2015, the company launched a $700 million program to renovate properties.

== Animal welfare campaign ==
In 2013, Marriott International committed to eliminating the use of battery cage eggs and gestation crates in its supply chain by 2015, but did not meet this goal. According to Vox, the Humane League and the Open Wing Alliance used online publicity and silent protest to pressure Marriott International. Marriott set a new target to source only cage-free eggs globally by 2025, reiterating its commitment to eliminating caged eggs from its global supply chain. In 2024, Marriott reported that 42.04% of the eggs in its supply chain were cage-free.

In May 2025, animal protection nonprofit Mercy for Animals claimed Marriott has attempted to silence activists. According to Mercy for Animals CEO Leah Garcés, the company sought to take down campaign websites that shared updates on its cage-free progress.

During a June 2025 hotel industry conference at the New York Marriott Marquis, a protest concerning the use of eggs from caged hens interrupted a panel featuring executives from major hotel companies, including Marriott International.

According to The Washington Post, as of 2026, Marriott International has not fulfilled this commitment. As of January 2026, Marriott International has declined to provide updated timelines for its global cage-free egg commitment, citing bird flu and supply-chain disruptions as obstacles to the 2025 deadline.

== Great America theme parks ==
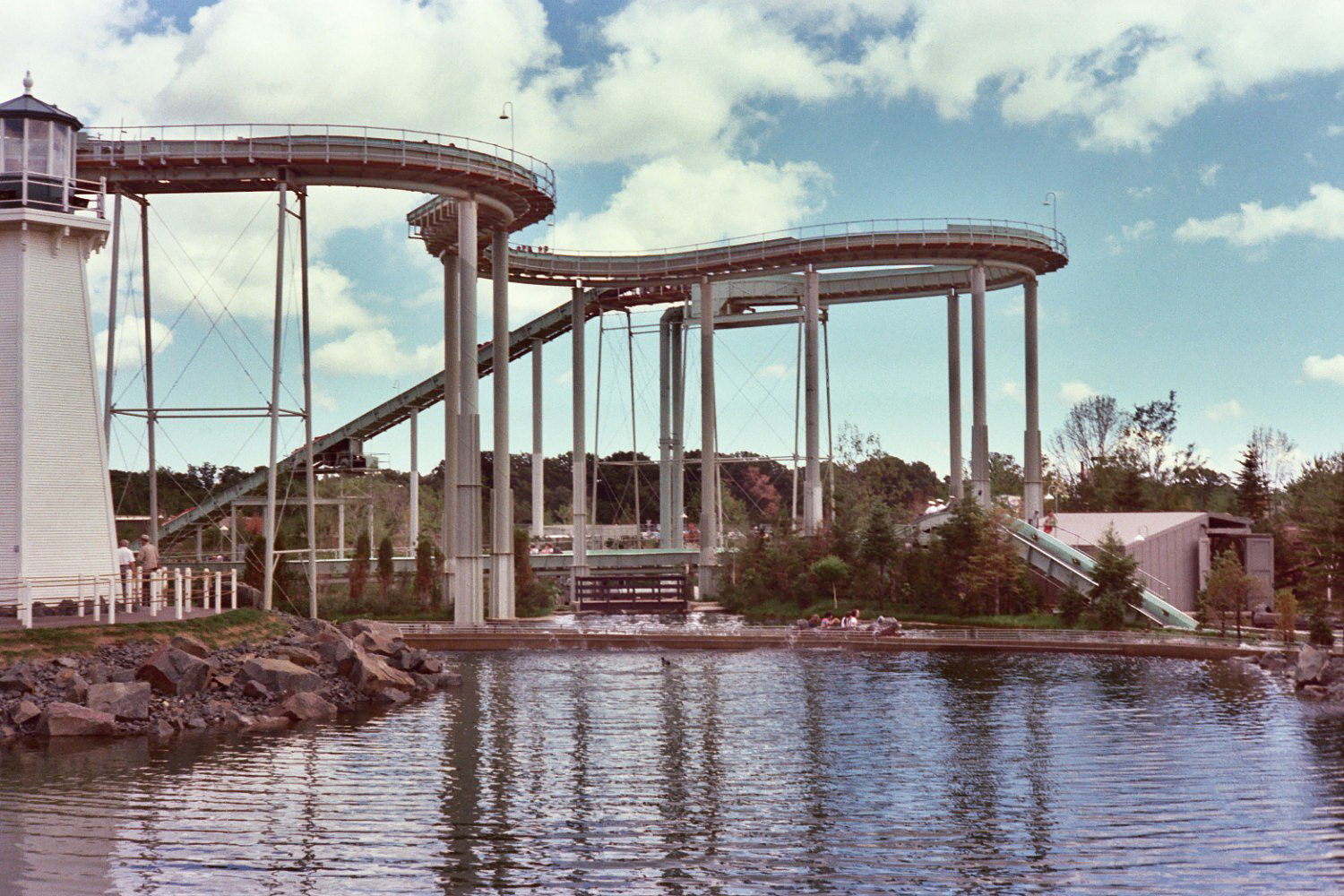
Yankee Harbor, one of the original areas part of Marriott Great America theme parks

Marriott developed three theme parks, of which two opened: Marriott's Great America in Santa Clara, California, and Marriott's Great America in Gurnee, Illinois. A third site was proposed, but never built in the Washington, DC, area; it was cancelled due to strong opposition by surrounding residents. The parks were operated by Marriott from 1976 until 1984, and were themed to celebrate American history. At the opening, the parks had nearly identical layouts.

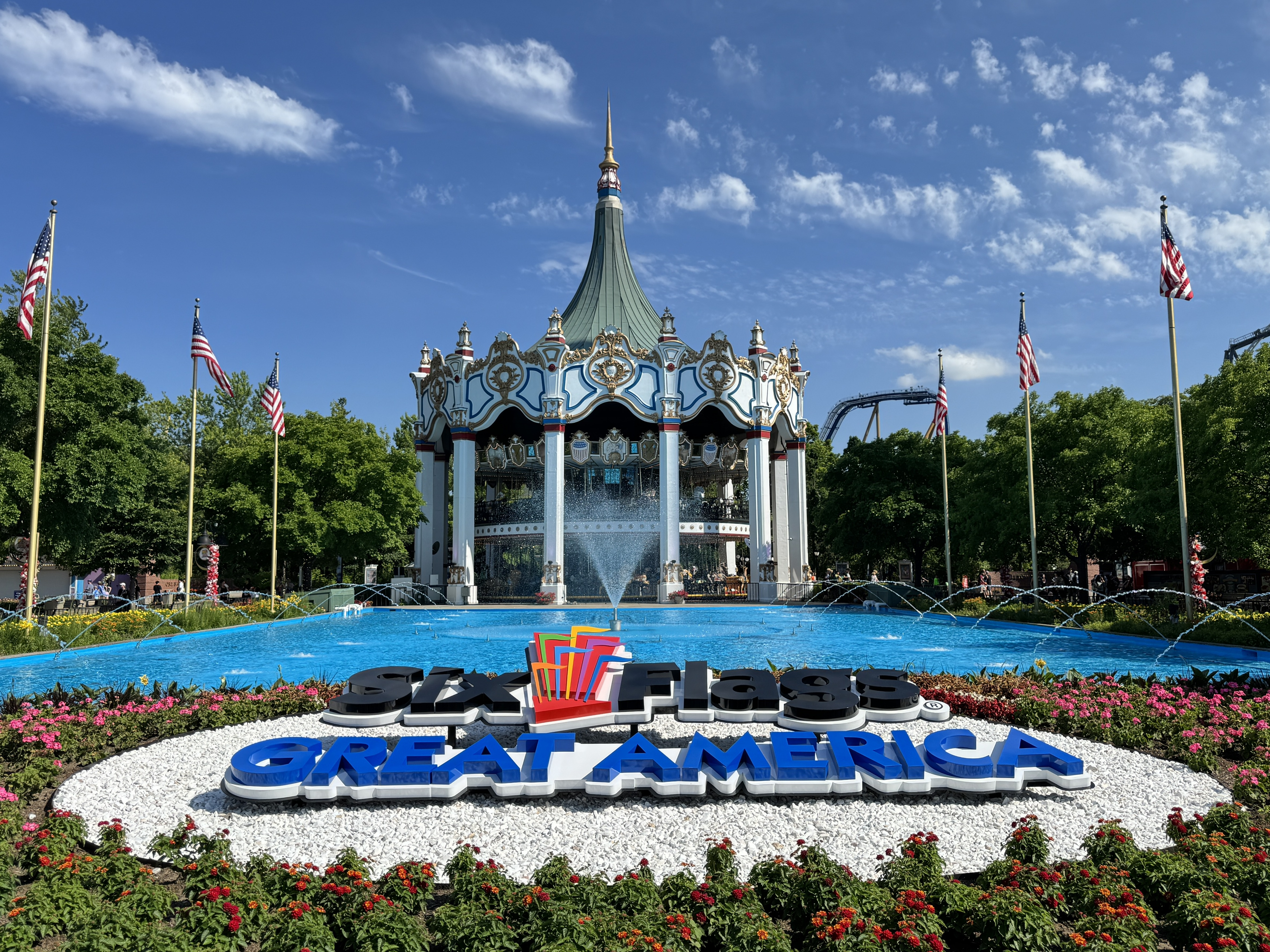
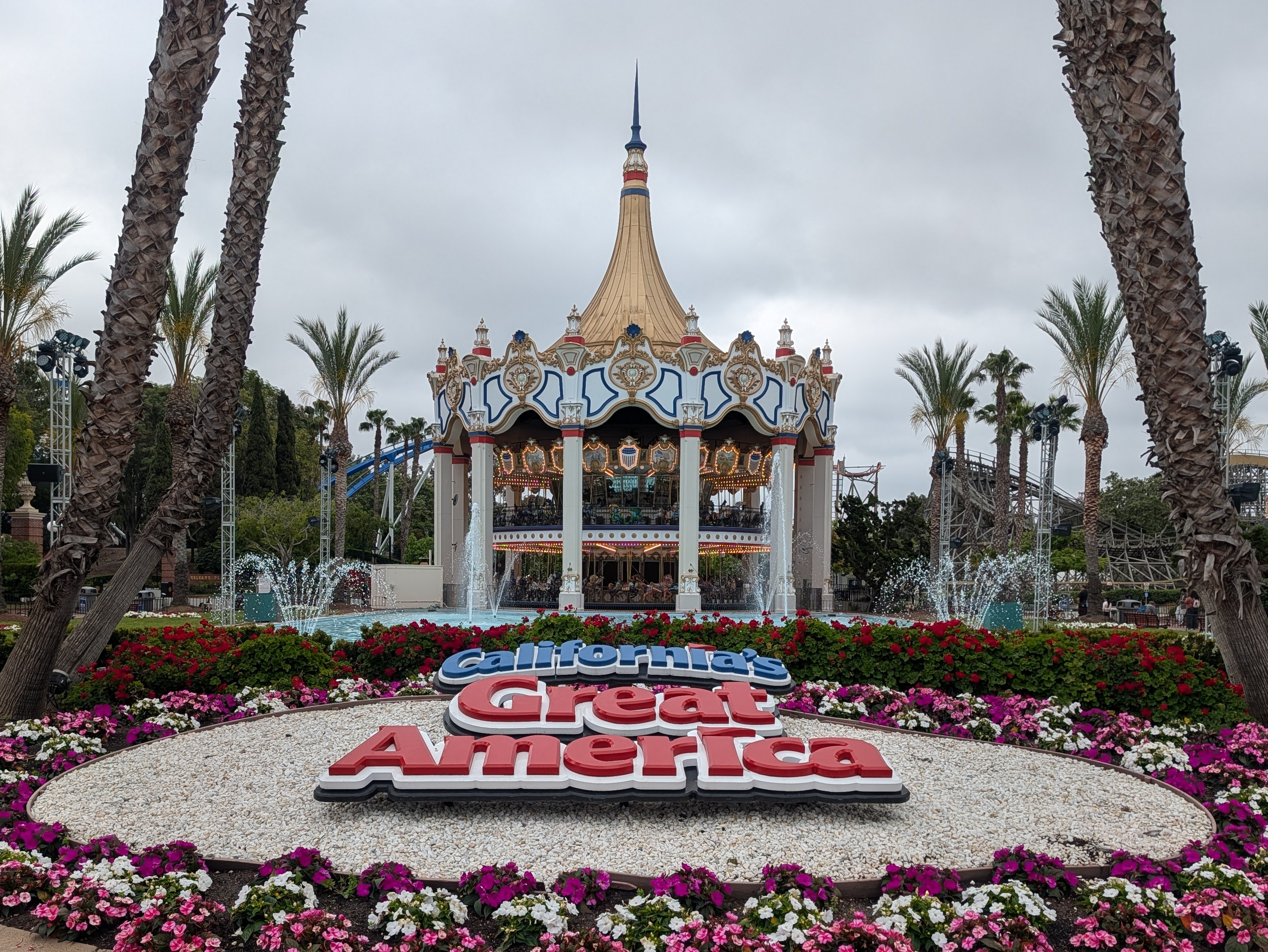
The original Marriott's Great America parks, Six Flags Great America in Illinois (top) and California's Great America in California (bottom), in 2026.

In 1984, Marriott disposed of its theme park division; both parks were sold and today are associated with national theme park chains. Following the 2024 merger between Cedar Fair and Six Flags, both parks are now owned by Six Flags.

The Gurnee location was sold to Six Flags in 1984; it operates today as Six Flags Great America. The Santa Clara location was sold to the City of Santa Clara, who retained the underlying property and sold the park to Kings Entertainment Company, renamed Paramount Parks in 1993. From 1993 to 2006, the Santa Clara location was known as Paramount's Great America. In 2006, Paramount Parks was acquired by Cedar Fair Entertainment Company, then Cedar Fair merged with Six Flags in 2024. The Santa Clara park operates today as California's Great America. The land of the Santa Clara, California, park was sold to the real estate company Prologis by Cedar Fair prior to the merger in 2022, with plans to close the Santa Clara park by 2033 at the latest. In the years after their sale, the layouts of both of the parks have diverged substantially.

== See also ==
- 2018 Marriott Hotels strike
