= Baltimore World Trade Center =

Skyscraper in Baltimore, Maryland, US

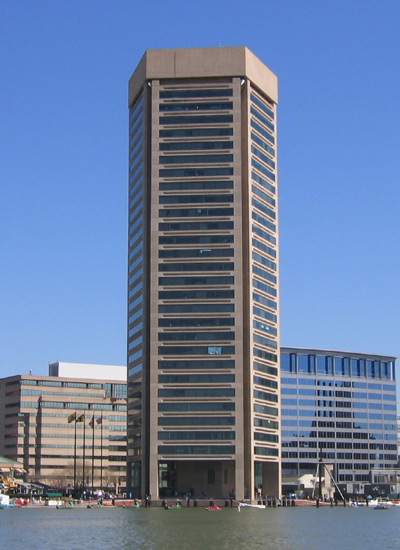
- Baltimore World Trade Center as seen from a boat in the Inner Harbor in 2005.

General information
- Status: Completed
- Type: Office building
- Location: 401 E. Pratt St; Baltimore; MD 21202; USA
- Coordinates: 39°17′09.66″N 76°36′34.77″W
- Construction started: October 1973
- Completed: January 1977
- Cost: $22 million
- Owner: Maryland Port Administration

Height
- Roof: 123.5 m (405 ft)

Technical details
- Floor count: 30
- Floor area: 422,000 sq ft (39,200 m^{2})

Design and construction
- Architect: Pei Cobb Freed & Partners
- Structural engineer: Weiskopf & Pickworth, New York, NY

The Baltimore World Trade Center is a 30-story skyscraper located on the Inner Harbor of Baltimore, Maryland designed by the architectural firm Pei Cobb Freed & Partners with principal architects Henry N. Cobb and Pershing Wong.

Planning and design of the building began in April 1966. Construction started in October 1973. The building was completed in January 1977, and its construction cost was of $22 million.

Rising 405 ft (123 m) above the one-acre plaza where it stands between Pratt Street and the harbor, the building is 30 stories tall when its basement, lobby level and upper utility level are included in the count. Gross floor space covers 422,000 sq ft (39,200 m^{2}). Major building components include 309,000 sq ft (28,700 m^{2}) of office floors, a lobby of 13,000 sq ft (1,200 m^{2}), a basement of 20,800 sq ft (1,930 m^{2}) and 38,000 sq ft (3,500 m^{2}) of ground-level plaza. It is the world's tallest regular pentagonal–based skyscraper (the pentagonal-based JPMorgan Chase Tower in Houston is taller, but is not regular).

== Name ==
The building's name identifies its purpose of accommodating "activities and services devoted to the promotion of world trade" as required for licensing of this name by the World Trade Centers Association. Baltimore is one of 16 charter members of the World Trade Centers Association.

The landmark tower houses the headquarters of the Maryland Port Administration, the Maryland Department of Business and Economic Development and the World Trade Center Institute, which is a member of the World Trade Centers Association and operates as a private, non-profit international business membership organization.

== Alignment and lighting ==
The building was positioned so that a corner points out toward the waters of the Inner Harbor, suggesting the prow of a ship. Perched at the Harbor's edge, the building appears to rise out of the water when viewed from certain vantage points. It presents a frontal plane toward the city, across a broad plaza between the building and Pratt Street.

In the base at each of the building's five recessed corners, 4,500-watt xenon spotlights dramatically illuminate the building at night, from the ground up, with oversized parabolic mirrors at the top of the five corners then reflecting the light outward in brilliant V-shaped beams. The "beacon" effect was loosely inspired by lighthouses found along the Chesapeake Bay. This signature lighting scheme, designed by Ray Grenald, is visible in the Baltimore skyline from seven to 10 miles away under favorable weather conditions. Installed in 1994, the xenon lighting system replaced 1,000-watt incandescent lamps originally installed at the base of the building, which illuminated only the first three floors.

== Top of the World ==
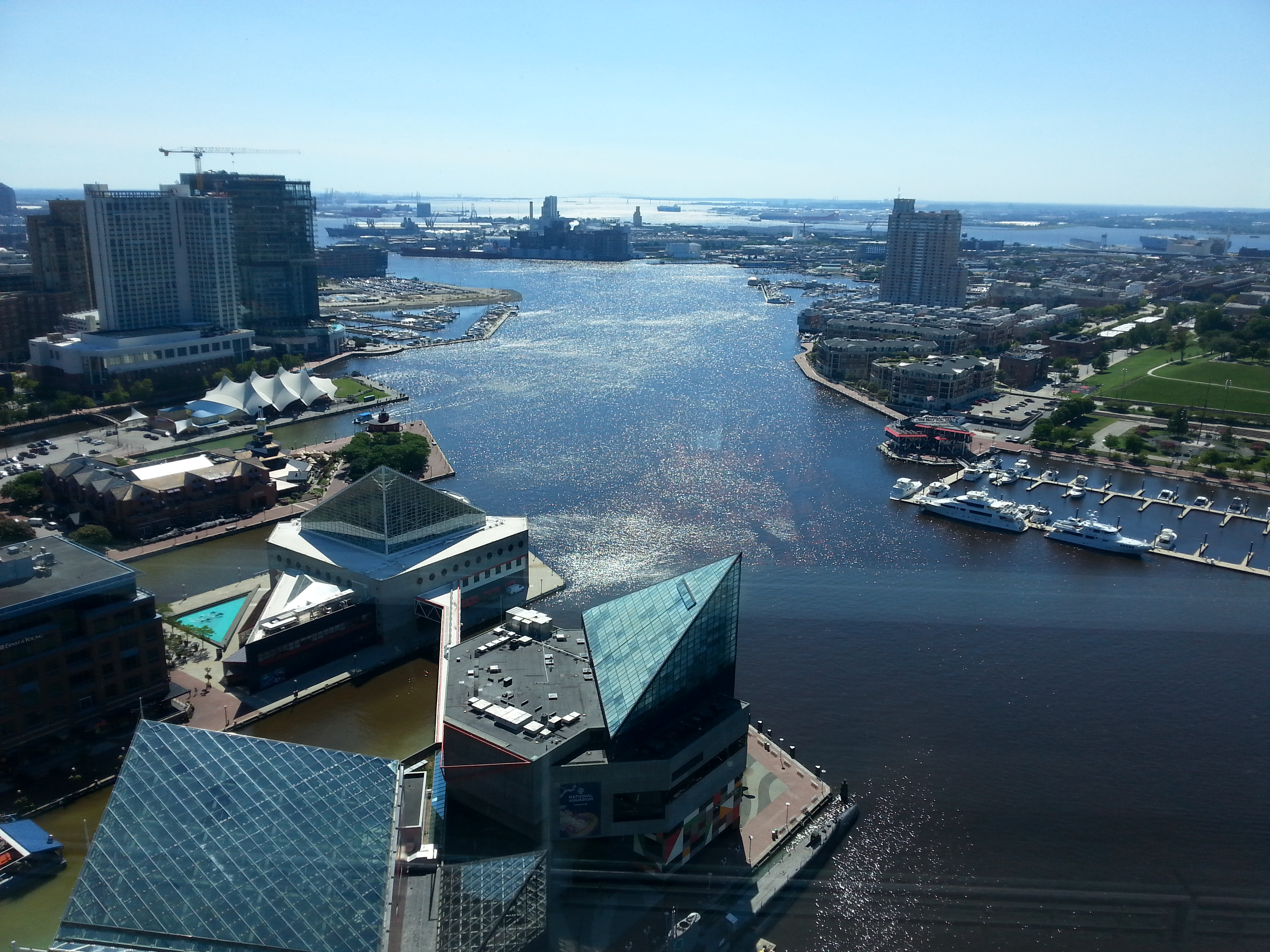
View from the Top of the World

An enclosed observation level on the 27th floor, called "Top of the World", provides a 360-degree panoramic view of the city. The Top of the World is handicap accessible, offers Baltimore history, rotating art exhibits, occasional special events, a gift shop featuring local art, and is home to the 9/11 Memorial of Maryland. The observation level is open to the public during daytime hours, and may be rented for special events by government organizations and corporations.

== Impact of September 11 attacks ==
Two hours after the September 11 attacks on the World Trade Center in New York City, Baltimore's World Trade Center was evacuated and closed. This was a response to a "credible" threat that the Baltimore building would also be attacked. A resident of southwest Baltimore was arrested that night and accused of giving the police a false warning.

Unsubstantiated bomb threats received on September 12 and September 14 further contributed to security concerns at the building. A temporary barrier of concrete walls was erected around the brick plaza between the building and Pratt Street, closing the area to pedestrian and vehicle access. Four barges were moved to the building's harbor side to protect it from attack by boats.

Due to the building's name and its prominent location on Baltimore's skyline, state officials presumed that a similar attack on other American cities would likely target the Baltimore World Trade Center. Their response was criticized, because "such drastic steps" were not taken at World Trade Center buildings in other cities. As security was relaxed later in the year, the concrete barriers and barges were removed.

The exterior lighting system was turned off and remained dark until the end of 2007. The waterfront walkway beneath the building, an extension of the Harborplace promenade, is now only open to the public during daylight hours.

=== 9/11 Memorial of Maryland ===
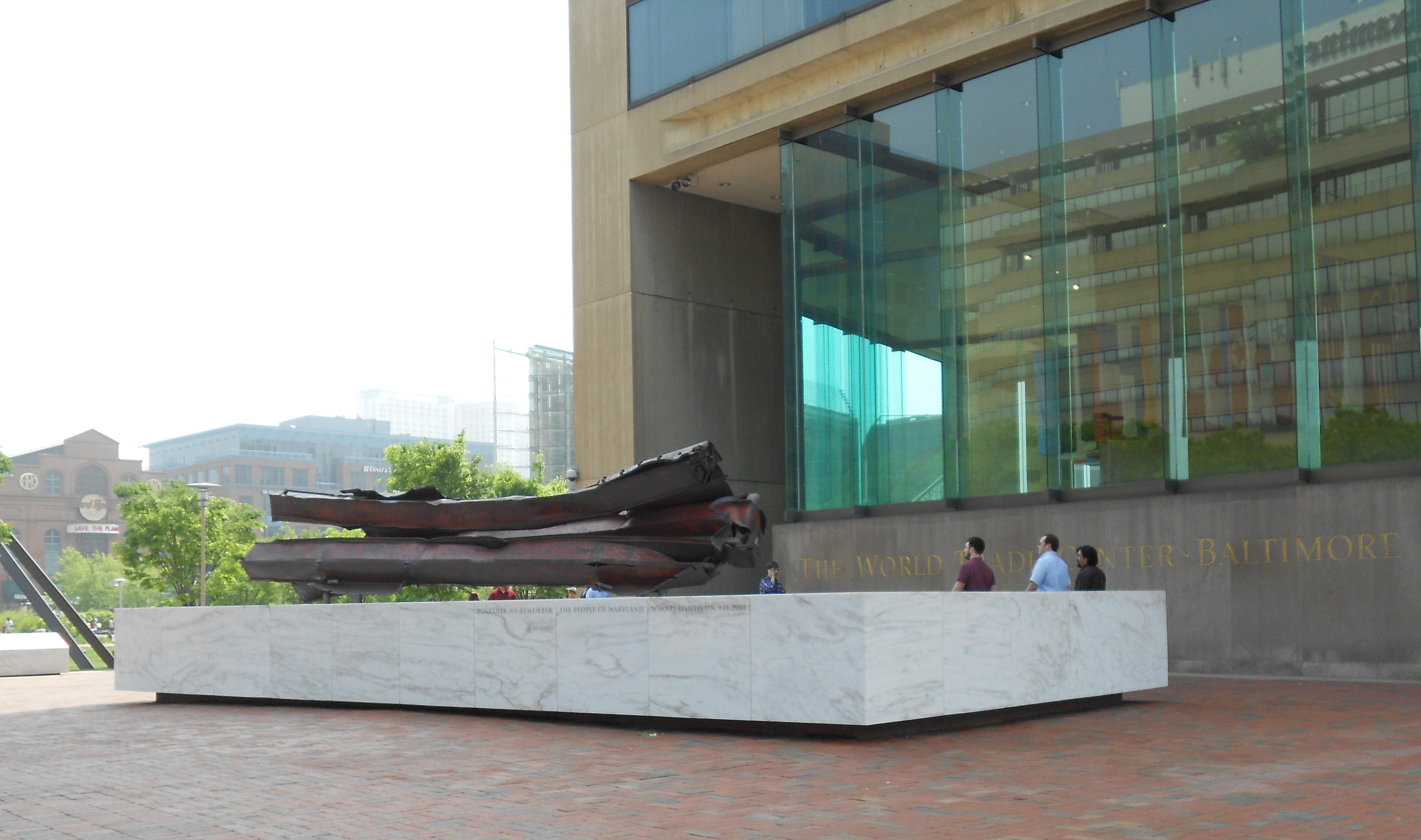
Memorial to the victims of the September 11 attacks

A memorial to the victims of the September 11, 2001 attacks, built on the pedestrian promenade of the Baltimore World Trade Center between the building and Pratt Street, was dedicated on September 11, 2011, the tenth anniversary of the attacks. The memorial structure includes three 22-foot long steel beams from the New York World Trade Center, which were part of the 94th to 96th floors of the north tower. Twisted and fused together, the steel beams and damaged limestone pieces from the Pentagon's west wall rest atop marble blocks bearing the names and birthdays of the 68 Marylanders who died in the 9/11 terrorist attacks. Windows on the top floor of the Baltimore World Trade Center are marked with all of the names of the September 11 attack victims.

Inscriptions on the marble platform, describing the events of the September 11 attacks, are arranged so that the building's shadow moves across them like a sundial. On September 11 each year, the shadow touches each inscription at the time its associated event occurred.

The second exhibit memorializes the passengers of Flight 93 with a smooth, glossy granite block.

The memorial was designed by the Baltimore architectural firm of Ziger/Snead and paid for by donations.

== 2003 Hurricane Isabel flooding ==
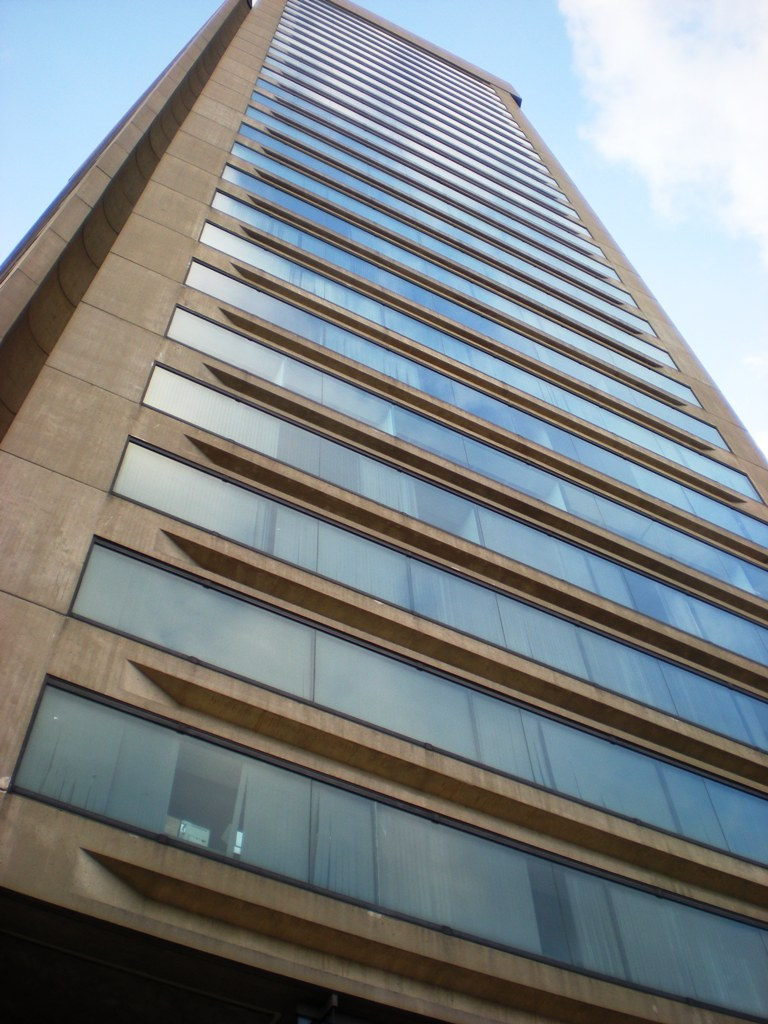
Detail of the building from the Harbor

Hurricane Isabel flooded the Baltimore World Trade Center's basement with 3 million US gallons (11,000 m^{3}) of water in September 2003, destroying electrical, mechanical and telecommunications equipment serving the entire building, located there. The building remained closed for clean-up for more than a month after the hurricane struck, displacing 60 tenant businesses.

== State ownership of building ==
The building is owned by the Maryland Port Administration. As a result, debates over state budgets have included public discussions about whether it should be sold. In the "Maryland Transition" report to the incoming Governor Martin O'Malley in January 2007, the Transportation work group noted that former Governor Robert Ehrlich favored selling the Baltimore World Trade Center. Governor O'Malley chose to maintain state ownership.

During the fiscal year ended June 30, 2008, the Baltimore World Trade Center incurred an operating loss of $2.3 million. This was due to an occupancy rate that had declined to 43 percent by March 2008. A low occupancy level was expected "to make it easier to sell".

The Maryland Board of Public Works took two important steps in 2007 and 2008 toward improving occupancy at the World Trade Center: streamlining lease approvals and hiring an agent. In December 2007, the Board delegated its lease approval authority to the Secretary of Transportation. Meridian Management Corp. was awarded a five-year contract, beginning on June 10, 2008, to serve as the World Trade Center's leasing agent. Meridian's contract, approved by the Board of Public Works on May 21, 2008, included operation and maintenance of the building. In 2019, MacKenzie Commercial Real Estate Services was chosen as the building's leasing agent.

== Floating wetlands gardens ==
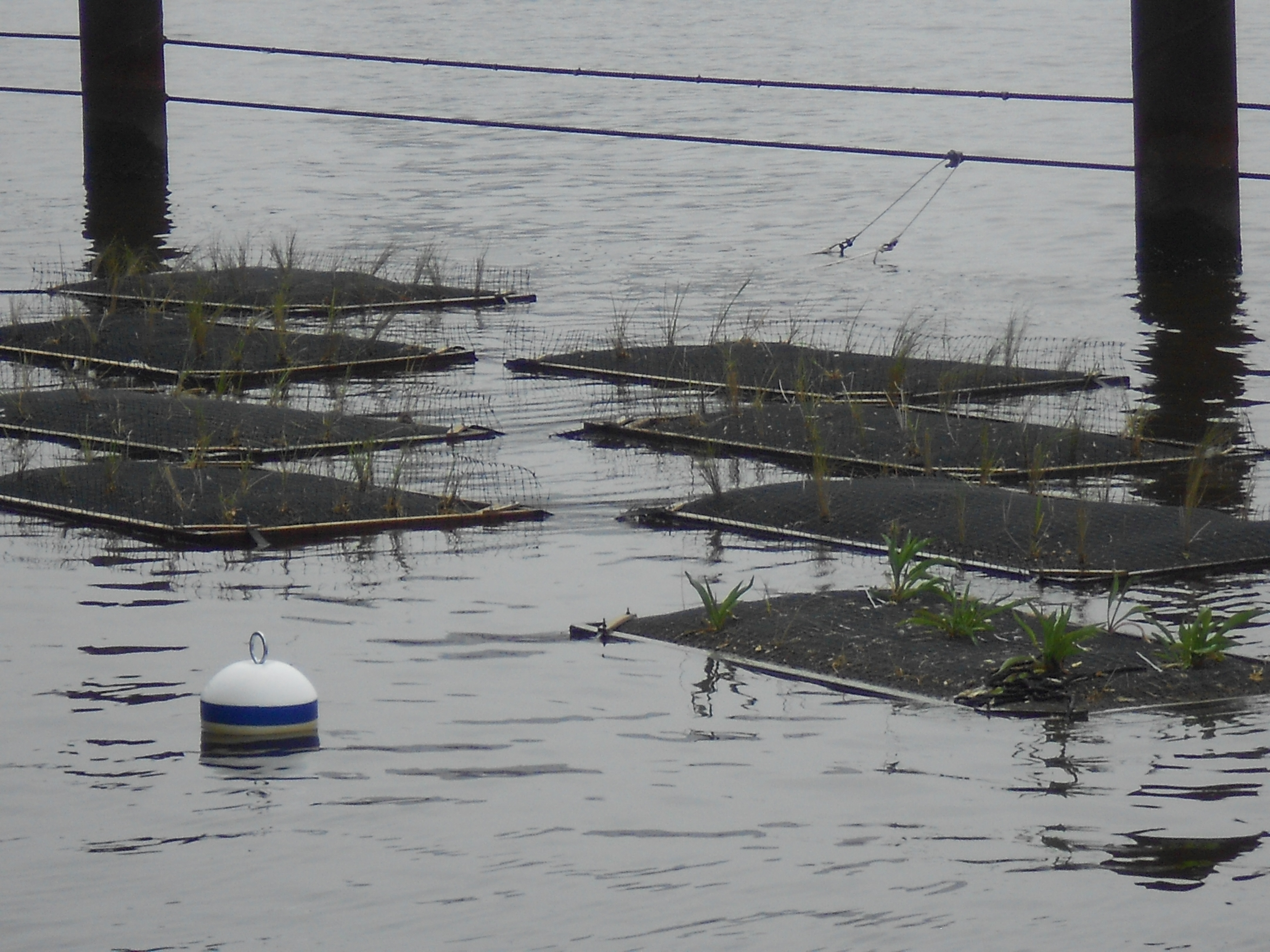
Floating "wetlands" attached to the waterfront bulkhead of the Baltimore World Trade Center (May 2012)

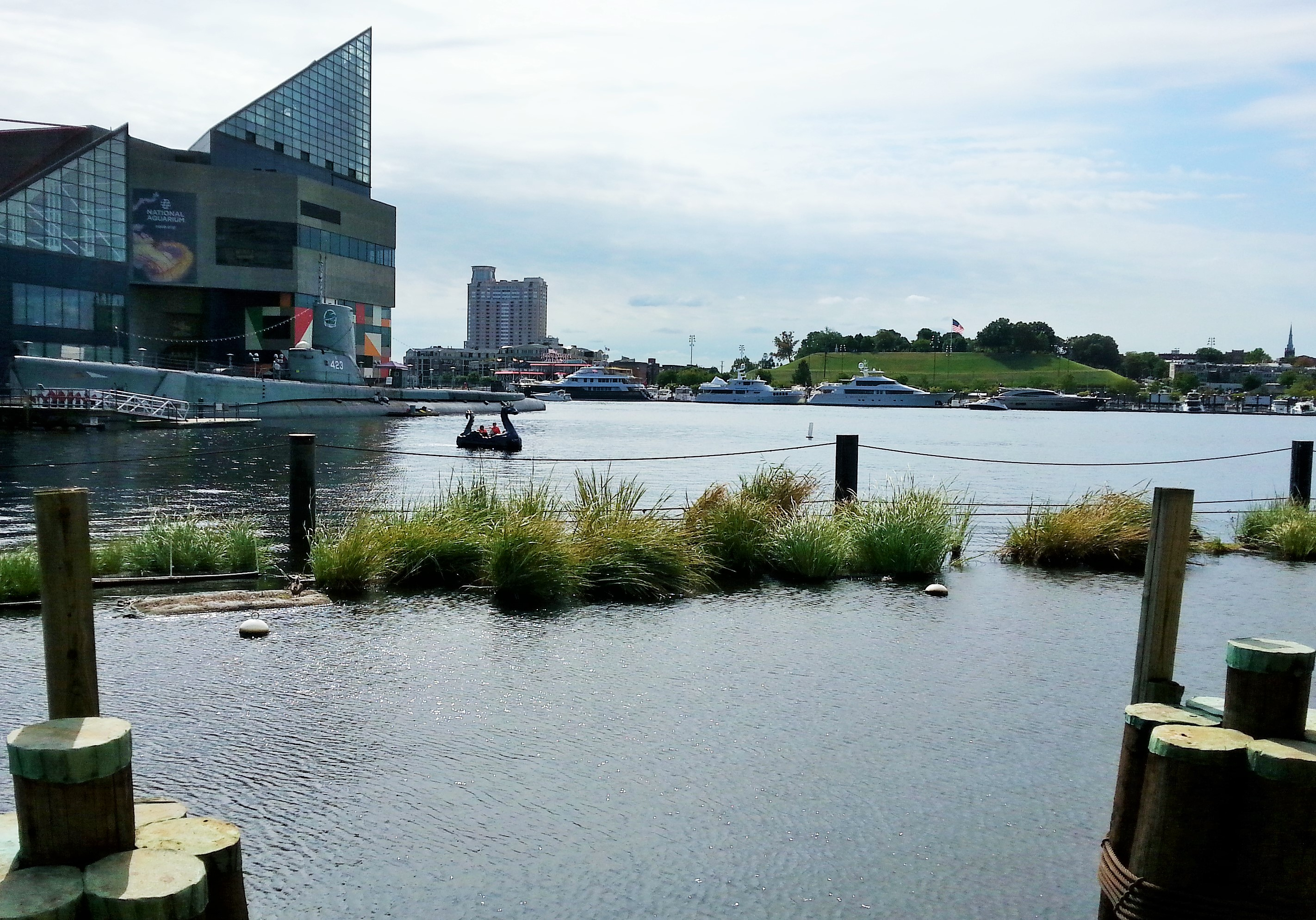
Floating wetlands area for waterfowl (2016)

Construction of an array of grassy floating gardens, tethered to the waterfront bulkhead below the southern face of the World Trade Center, began in the summer of 2010. This project, scheduled for completion by April 20, 2012, uses floating frames to build wetlands gardens in Baltimore's inner harbor. The Waterfront Partnership, a nonprofit group serving the businesses located at the inner harbor, started the project with eight small wetland floats, funded in 2010 with a grant from Blue Water Baltimore. After the original floats were destroyed by Hurricane Irene, students from the Living Classrooms Foundation and volunteers from T. Rowe Price built 50 new floating frames to restore the floating wetland system.

The inner harbor wetlands system is expected to extract at least two pounds of nitrogen from the water for every 100 pounds of grass growing on the floats. Its underside will also provide a habitat for small marine life, such as worms, barnacles, eels, crabs and mussels. Plants selected for the floats include a variety of marsh grasses which feed on nutrients from sewage leaks and storm runoff. Plastic beverage bottles, retrieved from trash floating in the inner harbor, are embedded in the structure of the floats to provide buoyancy.

== See also ==
- List of world trade centers
- September 11 attacks
- The Pentagon
- World Trade Center in Manhattan
- World Trade Centers Association
