= J. Willard Marriott =

American hotel founder

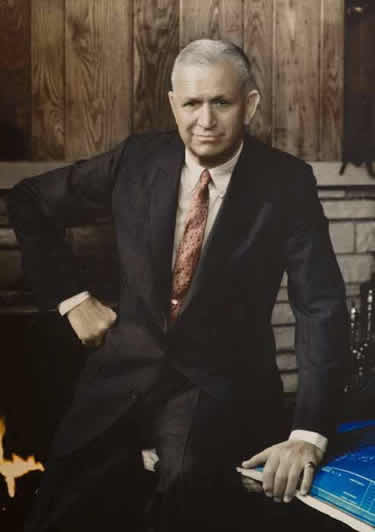
- Marriott in 1968
- Born: John Willard Marriott; September 17, 1900; Marriott Settlement, Utah, U.S.
- Died: August 13, 1985 (aged 84); Wolfeboro, New Hampshire, U.S.
- Burial place: Parklawn Memorial Park, Rockville, Maryland
- Education: Weber College; University of Utah
- Occupations: Founder, Marriott Corporation, since 1993 Marriott International
- Spouse: Alice Sheets (m. 1927)
- Children: 2, including Bill Marriott

John Willard Marriott Sr. (September 17, 1900 – August 13, 1985) was an American entrepreneur and businessman. He was the founder of the Marriott Corporation (which became Marriott International in 1993), the parent company of the world's largest hospitality, hotel chains, and food services companies. The Marriott company rose from a small root beer stand in Washington, D.C., in 1927 to a chain of family restaurants by 1932, to its first motel in 1957. By the time he died in 1985, the Marriott company operated 1,400 restaurants and 143 hotels and resorts worldwide, including two theme parks, earned US$4.5 billion in revenue annually with 154,600 employees. The company's interests also extended to a line of cruise ships.

== Early life ==
Marriott was born at Marriott Settlement (present-day Marriott-Slaterville, Utah), the second of eight children of Hyrum Willard Marriott and Ellen Morris Marriott. As a child, "Bill", as J. Willard was called, helped to raise sugar beets and sheep on his family's farm. At age 13, Marriott raised lettuce on several fallow acres on the farm and the harvest at summer's end brought $2,000, which Marriott gave to his father. The next year, Hyrum entrusted Marriott, his eldest son, with the sale of a herd of 3,000 sheep, sending him and the sheep unescorted by rail to San Francisco.

At the age of 19 and as a participating member of the Church of Jesus Christ of Latter-day Saints (LDS Church), he undertook a mission for two years, being assigned to New England. After completing his mission, he passed through Washington, D.C., on his way home during the sweltering summer months of 1921. While there:

"... [H]e walked from Capitol Hill to the Washington Monument, toiled up the steps to the top, walked back down again, and strolled over to the Lincoln Memorial. Everywhere he went tourists and pedestrians sweltered and sweated in the sultry, humid air. On the way back to his hotel, he just stood there in the street watching the crowds, he couldn't get over it: a push cart peddler would come along the street selling lemonade and soda pop and ice cream, and in minutes he would be cleaned out and on his way to stock up with another cartload".

Marriott graduated from Weber College (now Weber State University), where he served as student body president, with an associate degree in June 1923 and from the University of Utah, where he affiliated with Phi Delta Theta, with a bachelor's degree in June 1926. After Marriott earned his bachelor's degree, the president of Weber, Aaron Tracy, who had assisted Marriott to enroll there by helping him make up secondary education credits missed due to the Marriott family's ranching efforts, employed him at the school in Ogden. Marriott soon felt the urge, however, to be his own boss. He heard about a cousin's A&W Root Beer franchise and, remembering his experience seeing so many people suffer through the brutal summer heat of Washington, D.C., he decided to look into a venture there.

== Business career ==
In 1927, he secured from A&W Root Beer the franchise rights for Washington, D.C.; Baltimore, Maryland; and Richmond, Virginia; he then moved to Washington to open a nine-stool root beer stand there with his business partner, Hugh Colton. They opened on May 20, 1927, at 3128 14th Street, NW. He returned to Utah two weeks later and married Alice Sheets on June 9, 1927. With the approach of cooler Autumn months, and with the addition of Mexican food items to the menu, the stand became The Hot Shoppe, a popular family restaurant. In 1928, he opened the first drive-in east of the Mississippi, and the business was incorporated as Hot Shoppes, Inc. in Delaware in 1929. During the Second World War, the business expanded to include the management of food services in defense plants and government buildings, such as the U.S. Treasury.

Marriott's restaurant chain grew, and the company went public in 1953. In 1957, he expanded his business to hotels, opening the first Marriott hotel—actually a motel, the Twin Bridges Motor Hotel in Arlington, Virginia. The company became Marriott, Inc. in 1967. Two large chains were added to the group, the Big Boy family restaurants in 1967 and Roy Rogers Family Restaurants in 1968.

Over the years, Marriott's company interests expanded. Continuing with food services, Marriott eventually invented airline in-flight food service. This segment of their enterprise continues to be a large part of their business, providing food services to many major airlines. Marriott also provides food services to many colleges, elementary schools, and other venues.

=== Management style ===
Marriott was an energetic worker and rarely rested, preferring to run his company. Many attested to the fact that he ate, lived, breathed, and dreamed about how to run and improve his company:

"His managers never knew what time of day or night he'd show up at the kitchen door and go bird-dogging almost at a half-run through the kitchen, the pantries, the storage rooms, the refrigerators, the restaurant itself, running a finger over the shelves to check for dust, checking under tables and in cutlery drawers, checking the ranges, the storage rooms, the trays about to be served, sampling the root beer, and raising hell if everything wasn't spotless, neat, clean, bright, polished, done efficiently, done well."

Even after the company grew to include hundreds of restaurants and hotels, Marriott vowed to personally inspect every establishment at least four times a year.

Marriott tempered his rigid demands for perfection with devotion to his employees. According to his son, Bill Jr.,:

"In establishing the culture of the company, there was a lot of attention and tender loving care paid to the hourly workers. When they were sick, he went to see them. When they were in trouble, he got them out of trouble. He created a family loyalty."

According to Marriott himself (from a videotaped segment):

"You've got to make your employees happy. If the employees are happy, they are going to make the customers happy."

== Legacy ==
Institutions/buildings named in honor of J. Willard Marriott

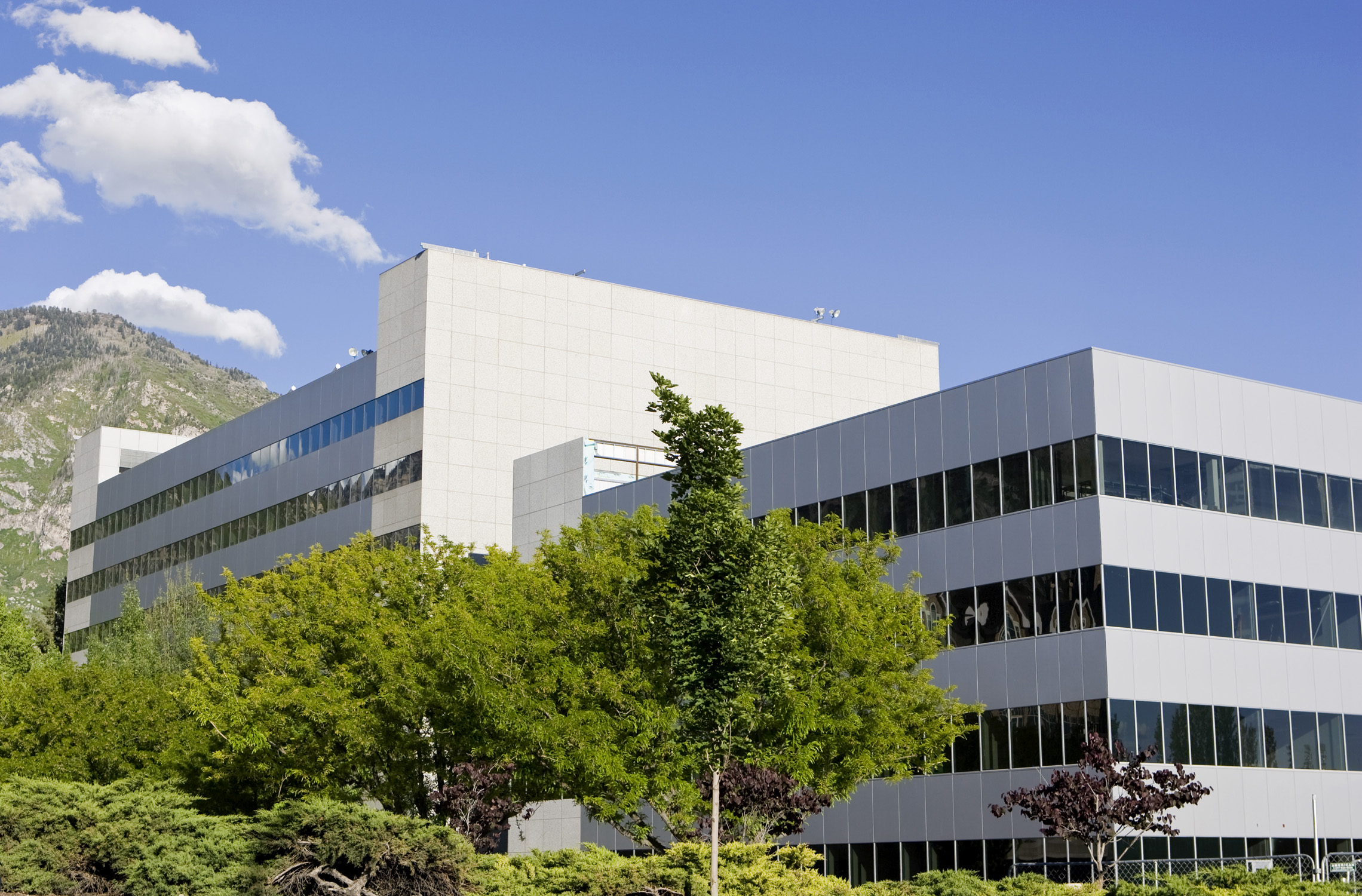
Marriott School of Business

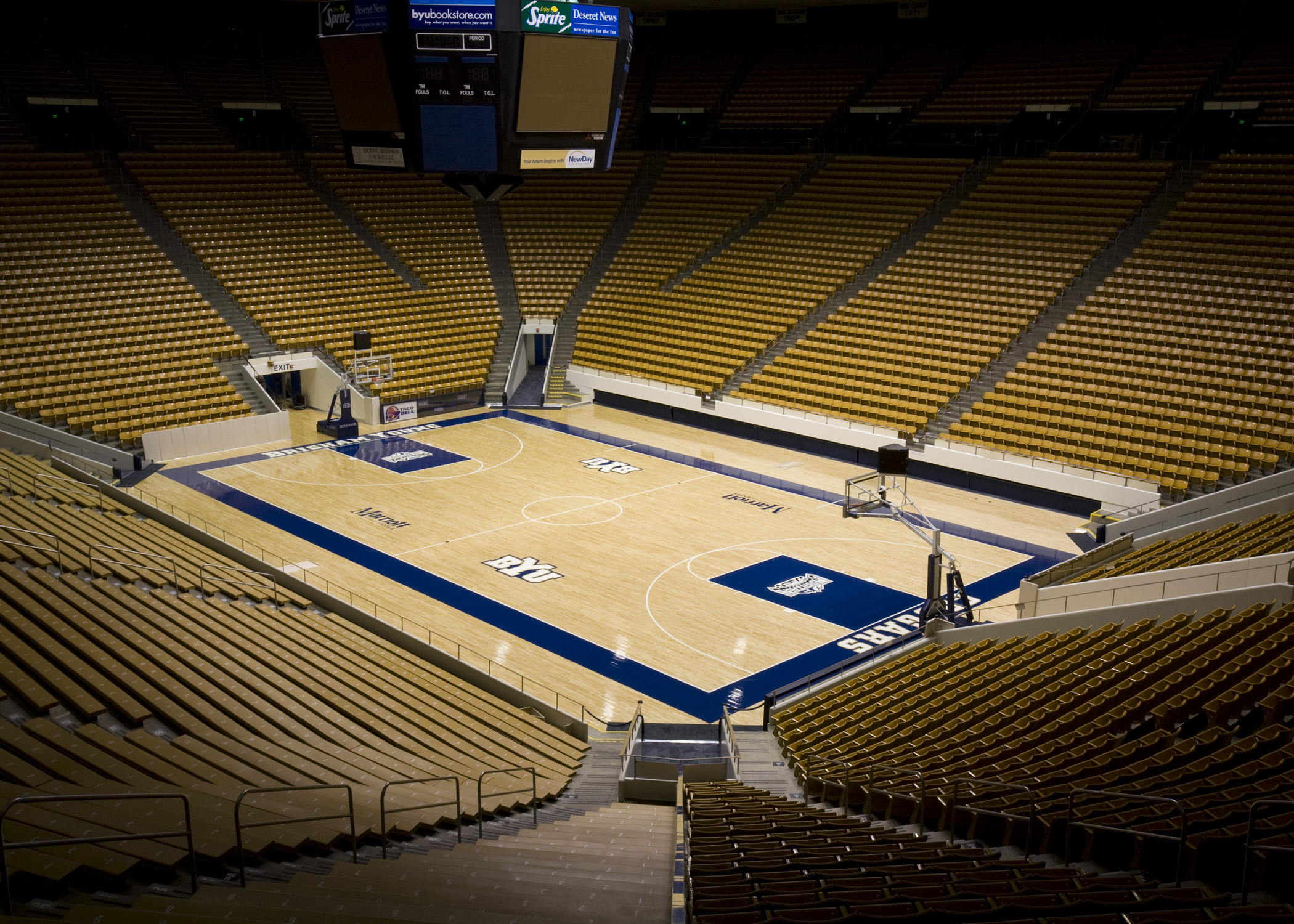
Marriott Center

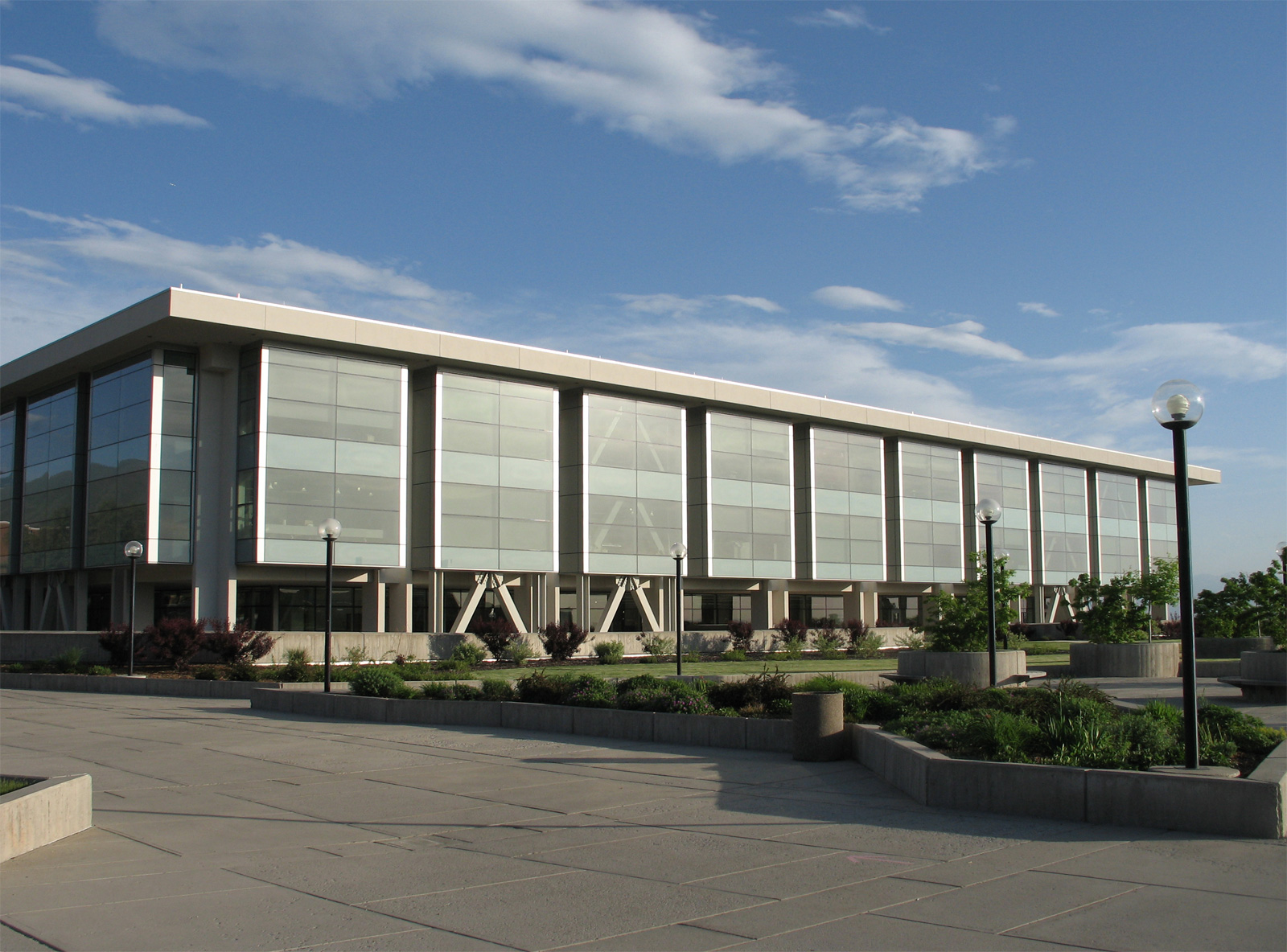
J. Willard Marriott Library

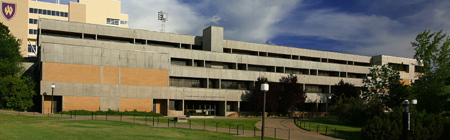
Marriott Allied Health Building at Weber State University

Marriott's legacy continues today through the continuance of the company he founded and through his community involvement and philanthropy. Marriott was a faithful member of the LDS Church and sought to share the church's teachings with others by placing a copy of the Book of Mormon in each hotel room, alongside a copy of a Gideon Bible—a tradition that has endured. He also donated funds to the church's flagship tertiary educational institution, Brigham Young University (BYU), resulting in the naming of BYU's 19,000-seat multi-purpose arena (Marriott Center) in his honor. While serving as home to the BYU Cougars men's and women's college basketball teams, the center also hosts various cultural events and religious devotionals. BYU's business school, the Marriott School of Business, is named in honor of Marriott. On the campuses of Marriott's alma maters stands the J. Willard Marriott Library at the University of Utah and the Marriott Allied Health Building at Weber State University which houses the Dumke College of Heath Professions. The Bullis School’s library is also named in honor of Marriott.

== Awards and honors ==
- 1971 – Golden Plate Award of the American Academy of Achievement
- 1980 – Silver Buffalo Award
- 1988 – Presidential Medal of Freedom

== Personal life and relationships ==
Marriott and his wife Alice Sheets had two sons, Bill and Richard. Alice was actively involved in the business, starting as the bookkeeper at the root-beer stand and eventually becoming vice president of Marriott Corporation. Despite the demands of the company, she felt her role as a mother to her two sons was her most important calling and balanced the demands of both of her endeavors. Alice was also active in numerous charitable and civic organizations, including serving as a trustee for the John F. Kennedy Center for the Performing Arts.

Both of their sons remain in the hospitality business. Bill Marriott is currently Executive Chairman and Chairman of the Board of Marriott International, while Richard Marriott is Chairman of the board for Host Hotels & Resorts, formerly Host Marriott Corporation.

Marriott maintained extensive business connections within his LDS Church heritage and membership. A prominent associate was Michigan Governor George W. Romney, father of U.S. Senator Mitt Romney, a former governor of Massachusetts and the Republican nominee for president of the United States in 2012. Marriott was also an active Republican. The family friendship is trans-generational as evidenced by Bill Marriott donating $1 million personally to Restore Our Future, a Romney PAC. Mitt Romney's first name is Willard, after John Willard Marriott.

Marriott served for many years, in the late 1940s and 1950s, as president of the LDS Church's Washington Stake, headquartered in Washington, D.C.

Marriott divided his time between Washington, D.C., and New Hampshire, spending his summers in the latter. He died from an apparent heart attack at a hospital in Wolfeboro, New Hampshire, on August 13, 1985, at the age of 84.
