= Marriott Motor Hotel Twin Bridges =

Hotel in Arlington, Virginia, US

Coordinates: 38.87°N 77.044°W

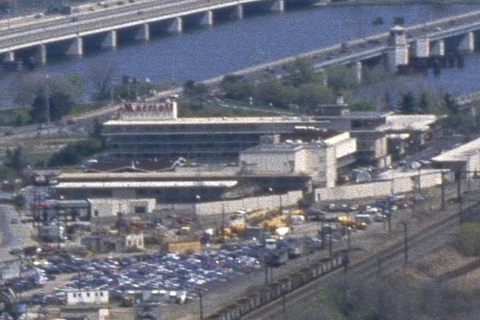
- Twin Bridges Marriott Hotel in the 1980s
- Interactive map of the Marriott Motor Hotel Twin Bridges area
- Alternative names: Marriott Motor Hotel; Twin Bridges Marriott Hotel
- Hotel chain: Marriott Corporation

General information
- Status: Demolished to create park
- Location: 333 Jefferson Davis Highway, Arlington, Virginia, United States
- Inaugurated: January 16, 1957; 69 years ago
- Closed: December 18, 1988; 37 years ago
- Demolished: 1990; 36 years ago

Technical details
- Floor count: 2 (1957)

Design and construction
- Developer: Hot Shoppes, Inc.

Other information
- Number of rooms: 360 (1957)

The Marriott Motor Hotel, later the Marriott Motor Hotel Twin Bridges and the Twin Bridges Marriott Hotel, was a hotel in Arlington County, Virginia. It was the first lodging facility operated by what would become Marriott International. It opened in 1957, closed in 1988, and was demolished in 1990.

== Location ==
The Marriott Motor Hotel was located in Arlington County, Virginia, where Northern Virginia meets the 14th Street Bridge, almost directly across the Potomac River from the Jefferson Memorial in Washington, D.C. From this position, it had views of the U.S. Capitol and Washington Monument. Its address was 333 Jefferson Davis Highway, Arlington, Virginia. The motel was highly visible and under the aerial approaches to Washington National Airport.

== History ==
=== 20th century ===
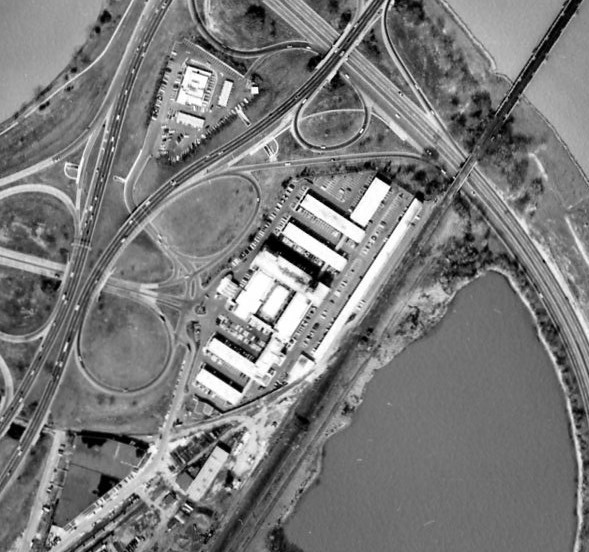
An aerial view of Marriott Motor Hotel Twin Bridges in February 1967. Marriott Motor Hotel Twin Bridges is visible in the center, adjacent to Hot Shoppes at the top left.

The Marriott Motor Hotel opened on January 16, 1957, shortly before the second inauguration of President Dwight D. Eisenhower. It contained 360 soundproofed rooms, each with air conditioning, king-size beds and free radio and black-and-white television.

The hotel consisted of 6 two-story buildings and a five-story central tower; all rooms had exterior entrances. The hotel also included a 335-seat Hot Shoppes restaurant, a gift shop, a barber shop, a beauty shop, a gas station, a laundromat, and an outdoor swimming pool that could be converted to an ice rink in the winter. Original rates were $8 per night plus $1 for each person, with a maximum charge of $12. Guests registered at a drive-in check-in desk, so the clerk could see how many people were in the guests' car. Clerks would then escort the guests to their room by bicycle.

The new hotel's proximity to The Pentagon and the airport allowed it to profit from both. Bill Marriott later claimed that it was "one of the very first airport hotels in the country."

After the Marriott Key Bridge Motor Hotel opened in 1960 in nearby Rosslyn, the original property was renamed the Marriott Motor Hotel Twin Bridges. In 1962, the hotel was expanded with the addition of a 950-seat banquet room, the Persian Room. The expansion of the hotel's convention facilities proved so successful that, in 1963, two more 700-seat banquet rooms were also added. By 1968, the hotel had been expanded to 454 rooms.

In 1978, Marriott sold the hotel, by that point renamed the Twin Bridges Marriott Hotel, along with four other hotels, to The Equitable Life Assurance Society of the United States for $92 million. Marriott continued to operate the hotels under their name, for a management fee and a percentage of gross operating profits.

On June 29, 1979, American musician Lowell George suffered a fatal heart attack while staying at the hotel.

=== Closure and demolition ===
The Twin Bridges Marriott Hotel closed permanently on December 18, 1988. It was demolished in 1990. The Arlington County government rejected a 1991 proposal for office redevelopment. In 1994, it approved an office and hotel plan that was never built.

In 1993, the Department of the Army attempted to obtain the land for a proposed military history museum.

In 2005, the County Board refused to grant permission for 2 seven-story office buildings on the site and an adjacent parcel at 355 Old Jefferson Davis Memorial Highway. Instead, the county organized an exchange of parcels that shifted the private development closer to Crystal City and secured the Twin Bridges property for public uses more in accord with its visual prominence and sensitive location. The site has been developed as a public recreation area as part of Arlington County's Long Bridge Park.

== Adjacent Hot Shoppes Restaurant ==
Directly across the Shirley Highway from the hotel was another, entirely separate Hot Shoppes Restaurant. It was built in 1937 as the first Hot Shoppes in Virginia. It was meant to serve Washington-Hoover Airport, which was next door until 1941. Noticing that airline passengers were buying box lunches to take with them, he began supplying box lunches to Eastern Airlines in what became the first airline catering service.

When the first of the 14th Street bridges, the Rochambeau Bridge (later the Arland D. Williams Bridge), was built in 1950, it left the restaurant surrounded by highways, which necessitated the construction of special exits and sidewalks with underpasses to reach it. Hot Shoppes, Inc. later built the Marriott Motor Hotel across the highway from the restaurant.

In 1968, the Virginia State Highway Department purchased the restaurant from Marriott for $1.3 million, in order to widen the Shirley Highway. It was demolished sometime prior to 1971. The underpasses and some of the sidewalks were left in place, but have been closed to use.

== See also ==
- List of motels
