= World Trade Center Institute =

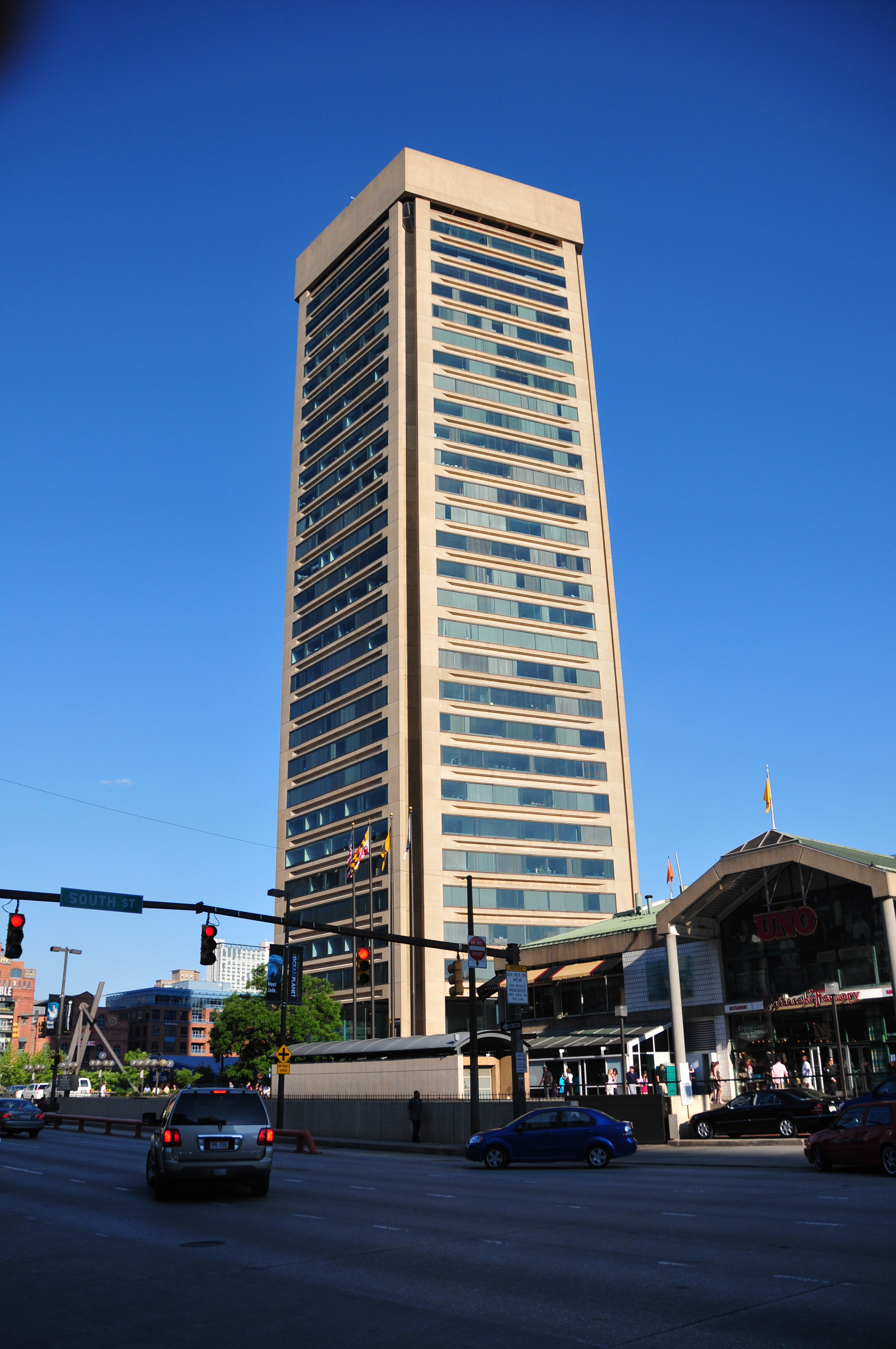
- Building from Pratt Street
- Abbreviation: WTCI
- Website: wtci.org

The 'World Trade Center Institute' (WTCI) operates as a private, non-profit, and non-political membership organization located in the Baltimore World Trade Center building on the Inner Harbor of Baltimore, Maryland. Financed in cooperation with area businesses and the State of Maryland, WTCI’s mission is to drive the growth of Maryland’s global business community. WTCI is one of the 320 members of the World Trade Center Association (WTCA), which operates WTCs in 96 countries around the world.

Maryland Governor William Donald Schaefer founded WTCI in 1989 along with chairman of RTKL Associates, Harold Adams and a board of directors. After partnering with the Maryland Port Administration in 1991, WTCI was granted the World Trade Center Association license, making it the official proprietor of Baltimore World Trade Center and a subsidiary of the World Trade Center Association.

WTCI was recognized in 2010–2012 by the Baltimore Business Journal as the Largest Association in the Baltimore area and in 2009 as the Largest Business Networking Organization.

In March 2011, WTCI was selected by the World Bank to act as the Mid-Atlantic region’s Private Sector Liaison Officer (PSLO). The PSLO enables the region’s business community to use the World Bank program as a way to engage the private sector in international development programs. WTCI joined three other organizations in the United States with the World Bank accreditation, including the Chicago Global Mid-West Alliance, the Greater Houston Partnership and the Trade Development Alliance of Greater Seattle.

== History ==
Maryland governor William Donald Schaefer founded WTCI in 1989 alongside chairman of RTKL Associates, Harold Adams, and a prominent board of directors. With the inauguration of WTCI, Schaefer and Adams sought to expand Maryland’s global business community, foster international liaisons, and expose local businesses to opportunities abroad. After partnering with the State of Maryland Port Administration in 1991, WTCI was awarded the World Trade Center Association license, making it the official proprietor of the World Trade Center Baltimore and a subsidiary of the expansive World Trade Center Association.

In 1995, WTCI created the Maryland International Business Leadership Awards program with the purpose of featuring successful leaders in the international business community. Each year, firms are recognized in areas of global business excellence, including, but not limited to manufacturing, agriculture, hi-tech, environmental, and service industries. The Governor’s Leadership Award is presented to an individual who has made concerted efforts to augment Maryland’s global business presence.

The World Trade Resource Center was later opened in 1996, offering companies access to print and electronic directories and databases and providing them with information regarding matters of international trade. During the same year, WTCI merged with the Maryland International Center and acquired management over a federally funded program geared toward international visitors. Over the course of the next year, WTCI began to supervise the Maryland Sister States Program for the Maryland Department of Business and Economic Development and was a recipient of the President’s E-award for excellence in exporting.

== Events ==
The organization offers four signature events and three international business series each year.

=== Maryland International Business Leadership Awards ===
The event takes place once a year.

=== Embassy Night ===
The event takes place once a year. The first Embassy Day was held in 1988. In 2013, World Trade Center Institute held its 25th anniversary event. "Twenty-five years ago, a unique event concept was unveiled: A platform that offered the rare chance to simultaneously connect with multiple embassies, trade investment groups and area business leaders – all on one day, in one place, at one time. This concept became a reality and Embassy Night (formerly Embassy Day) was born. Since then, Embassy Night has become one of the largest gatherings of foreign diplomats and business leaders in the country."

== International Business Services ==
WTCI’s network connections’ services consist of assistance in identifying and building business relationships, access to WTCI network members, access to the Washington D.C. diplomatic community, access to the global WTCA network, and access to the World Bank program.

WTCI provides multiple global intelligence services including: daily Global Strategic Briefs, containing international headlines and analysis by industry experts; International Traveler's Packages, with an in-depth overview of any country, key contacts, and tools to familiarize new-to-market travelers with local business practices and culture; and access to proprietary global trade data.

In March 2011, WTCI was selected by the World Bank to act as the Mid-Atlantic region’s Private Sector Liaison Officer (PSLO). The PSLO enables the region’s business community to use the World Bank program as a way to engage the private sector in international development programs. WTCI joined three other organizations in the United States with the World Bank accreditation, including the Chicago Global Mid-West Alliance, the Greater Houston Partnership and the Trade Development Alliance of Greater Seattle.

== Professional Exchanges Program ==
The World Trade Center Institute (WTCI)’s Professional Exchanges Program (PEP) division is responsible for planning and implementing exchange programs for professionals abroad in a variety of countries. Exchange programs coordinated by WTCI are concentrated in various areas of expertise including freedom of the press, national security, education, HIV/AIDS, environment, minority programs, IT and the digital world, foreign policy and government, and economics and business development. WTCI’s PEP is a seasoned host, having facilitated the exchange of business partners, foreign delegations, and expatriates for over twenty years.

In addition, WTCI exclusively manages the U.S. Department of State’s International Leadership Visitors Program (IVLP) for the state of Maryland. Under IVLP, WTCI arranges a series of programs for the benefit of current and future generations of foreign leaders, which attempts to illuminate best practices in a particular field of expertise. The IVLP seeks to enhance international understanding and plays a crucial role in the development of U.S. foreign relations through citizen diplomacy.

WTCI is one of few organizations certified to take part in USAID’s Community Connections program, allowing it the unique opportunity to host professionals from the Republics of the Former Soviet Union. Community Connections is a program that is primarily concerned with improved cooperation and collaboration between the U.S. and visiting key agencies through new experiences in professional settings and exposure to American culture.

WTCI’s Professional Exchanges Program is also involved with the Fulbright Scholar Program, a program of the Bureau of Educational and Cultural Affairs, U.S. Department of State, and the Foreign Service Institute’s Nationals Training Program.

== WTCI Founding Companies ==
- Abell Foundation
- Advance Business Systems
- Arthur Anderson and Company
- Baltimore Sun
- BGE/Constellation Energy
- Black & Decker
- Crown Central Petroleum Corp
- DBED
- Ellicott Machine Corp (now Ellicott Dredge)
- Ernst & Young
- First Maryland Bancorp (now M&T)
- Four Seas & Seven Winds Travel
- Frank, Berstein, Conaway & Goldman
- Giant Food, Inc
- Hogan & Hartson
- IBM Systems Integration Div
- KPMG
- Legg Mason
- McCormick & Co
- McGuire, Woods
- MDA
- MDOT
- Miles & Stockbridge
- NASA Goddard Space Flight Center
- Perdue Farms
- Phillips Foods
- Piper Marbury (now DLA Piper)
- Port of Baltimore
- RTKL
- SCM Chemicals
- Semmes, Bowen & Semmes
- Signet Bank/First Union/Wachovia
- Trahan, Burden & Charles
- University of Maryland
- Westinghouse (now Northrop Grumman)
