= Bill Marriott =

American businessman

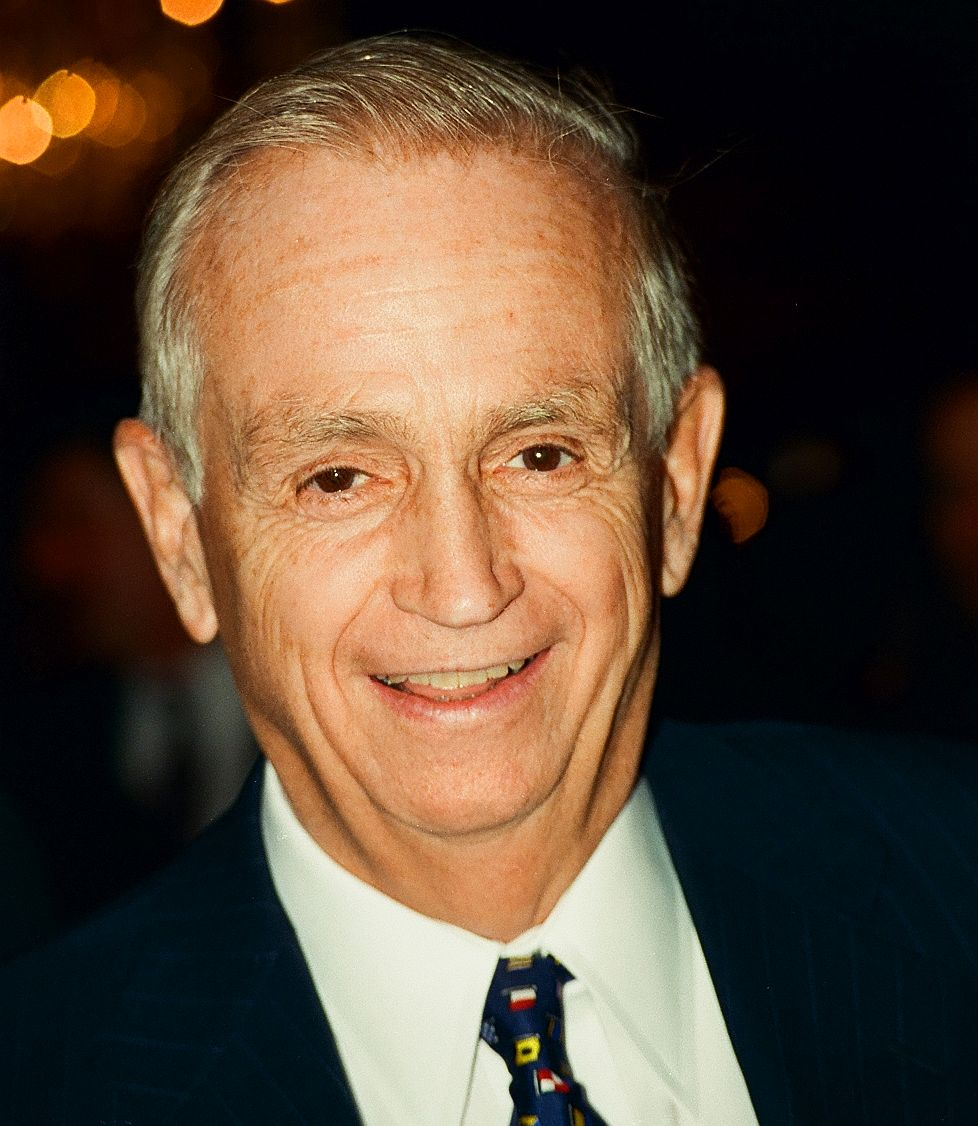
- Marriott in 1998
- Born: John Willard Marriott; March 25, 1932 (age 94); Washington, D.C., U.S.
- Education: University of Utah (BS) (1954)
- Occupation: Executive chairman of Marriott International
- Political party: Republican
- Spouse: Donna Garff (m. 1955; died 2025)
- Children: 4
- Parents: J. Willard Marriott (father); Alice Marriott (mother)
- Website: www.marriott.com/culture-and-values/jw-marriott-jr.mi

John Willard "Bill" Marriott Jr. (born March 25, 1932) is an American billionaire businessman who is the executive chairman of Marriott International, of which he owns 11.28%.

== Early life and education ==
Marriott was born in Washington, D.C., the son of Alice Marriott and J. Willard Marriott, the founder of Marriott Corporation. He attended St. Albans School in Washington, D.C. He is also an Eagle Scout and recipient of the Distinguished Eagle Scout Award.

In 1954, Marriott earned a BS in finance from the University of Utah. While there he met his wife, the daughter of a professor.

Upon graduating, Marriott went to a Navy training school in Georgia.

In June 29, 1955, Marriott was married at the Salt Lake Temple in Salt Lake City.

== Career ==
Marriott joined Marriott Corporation in 1956. He pushed his father, who was wary of taking on debt after experiencing the Great Depression, to expand from the restaurant business into the hotel business.

Marriott was elected executive vice president and member of the board of directors in January 1964, president of the company in November 1964, chief executive officer in 1972, and chairman of the board in 1985. He introduced the practice of revenue management to the hotel industry.

Effective March 31, 2012, Marriott assumed the role of executive chairman of the company and relinquished the role of chief executive officer to Arne Sorenson.

== Awards ==
In 2001, Marriott was named The Industry Leader of The Year by Broad College of Business, Michigan State University.

On May 4, 2006, Marriott received an honorary doctorate of humanities from Weber State University and delivered the commencement speech.

On June 2, 2009, Marriott received the Icon of the Industry award from Cornell University School of Hotel Administration.

On November 19, 2016, Ernst & Young named Marriott the National/Overall Entrepreneur of the Year.

In 2018, Marriott received the Distinguished Service Award by the National Maritime Historical Society.

== Personal life ==
He married Donna Rae Gariff (June 10, 1935 - December 30, 2025) in the Salt Lake Temple On June 29, 1955. They had four children—all of whom work for Marriott International:

- Debbie Harrison (nee' Marriott) (b. 1956)
- Stephen Gariff Marriott (1958-2013)
- John Willard "Will" Marriott III (b. 1961)
- David S. Marriott (b. 1963)

In 2018, Bill's son John Marriott III sued both him and his uncle, Richard Marriott, for allegedly cutting John out of the family fortune, in part for divorcing his wife without approval of his father. The lawsuit was settled out of court.

Bill Marriott's wife, Donna Gariff, passed away on December 30, 2025 in their home at Bethesda/Chevy Case, Maryland. She is buried at Arlington National Cemetery.

== Bibliography ==
- Without Reservations: How a Family Root Beer Stand Grew into a Global Hotel Company Luxury Custom Publishing LLC, May 1, 2013
