= Alice Marriott =

American businesswoman

- Born: Alice Taylor Sheets; October 19, 1907; Salt Lake City, Utah, U.S.
- Died: April 17, 2000 (aged 92); Washington, D.C., U.S.
- Education: University of Utah (B.A., Spanish, 1927)
- Occupations: Restaurateur, philanthropist
- Spouse: J. Willard Marriott (m. 1927; died 1985)
- Children: J. W. Marriott Jr. Richard E. Marriott
- Parent(s): Alice Taylor and Edwin Spencer Sheets

Alice Sheets Marriott (October 19, 1907 – April 17, 2000) was an American entrepreneur and philanthropist. She was married to J. Willard Marriott, founder of the hospitality company Marriott Corporation.

== Early life and career ==
Marriott was born in Salt Lake City, the daughter of Alice Taylor and Edwin Spencer Sheets. She graduated with honors from the University of Utah in 1927 at age 19. She was a member of Phi Kappa Phi Honor Society and Chi Omega sorority. She married J. Willard Marriott in the Salt Lake Temple on June 9, 1927.

In 1927, Alice worked as a bookkeeper with her husband at a root beer stand they both started. After introducing a Mexican-themed menu, the stand was renamed The Hot Shoppe and several more were opened. Alice and her husband opened their first motel, the Twin Bridges Motor Hotel in Arlington, Va., in 1957. This one motel grew into a chain of Marriott hotels.

== Later life and death ==
Marriott served two ten-year terms on the board of the John F. Kennedy Center for the Performing Arts. She was also vice-chairman of the Republican National Committee from 1965 to 1976, and honorary chairman of the 1973 Richard Nixon inaugural committee.

She died on April 17, 2000 at Georgetown University Hospital at the age of 92.

== Legacy ==
Marriott provided endowments to educational institutions. In 1988 she provided funds for the Marriott School of Management at Brigham Young University. The University of Utah opened the Alice Sheets Marriott Center for Dance, which houses the University's departments of Modern Dance and Ballet, on September 25, 1989.

== Family ==
Marriott's mother Alice Taylor Sheets married U.S. Senator Reed Smoot on 2 July 1930 after both of them had been widowed.
